= Vågsøy Municipality =

Former municipality in Sogn og Fjordane, Norway

Vågsøy Municipality Vågsøy kommune
- Former municipality
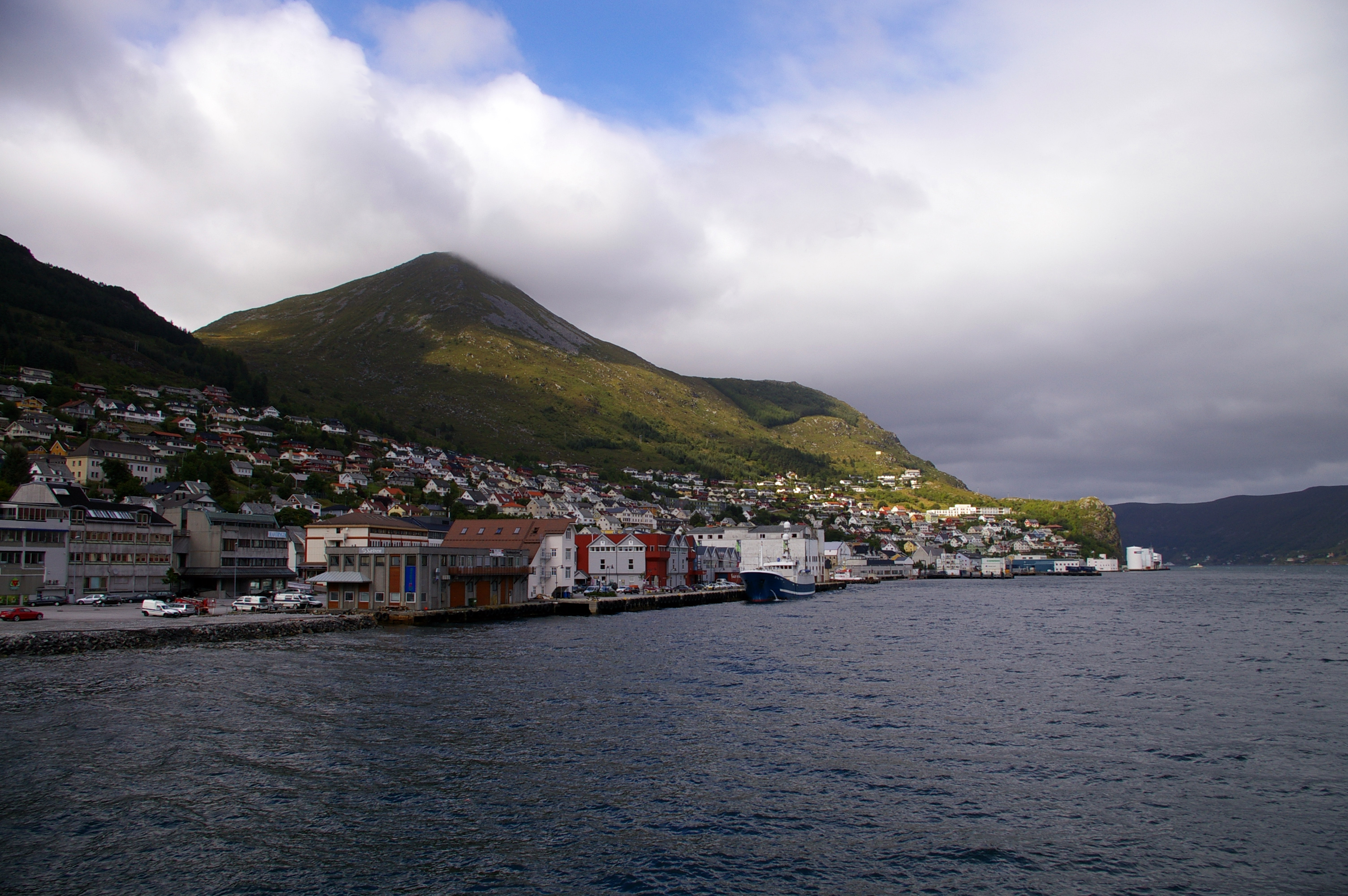
- View of the town of Måløy

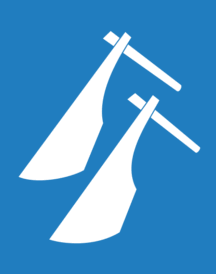
- Flag Coat of arms

- Sogn og Fjordane within Norway

- Vågsøy within Sogn og Fjordane
- Coordinates: 61°55′16″N 05°11′37″E
- Country: Norway
- County: Sogn og Fjordane
- District: Nordfjord
- Established: 1 Jan 1964
  - Preceded by: Nord-Vågsøy and Sør-Vågsøy
- Disestablished: 1 Jan 2020
  - Succeeded by: Kinn and Stad
- Administrative centre: Måløy

Government
  - Mayor (2015-2019): Kristin Maurstad (Ap)

Area (upon dissolution)
  - Total: 176.70 km^{2} (68.22 sq mi)
  - Land: 171.33 km^{2} (66.15 sq mi)
  - Water: 5.37 km^{2} (2.07 sq mi) 3%
  - Rank: #345 in Norway
- Highest elevation: 689.1 m (2,261 ft)

Population (2019)
  - Total: 5,970
  - Rank: #175 in Norway
  - Density: 33.8/km^{2} (88/sq mi)
  - Change (10 years): ▼ −0.3%
- Demonym: Vågsøyværing

Official language
  - Norwegian form: Nynorsk
- Time zone: UTC+01:00 (CET)
  - Summer (DST): UTC+02:00 (CEST)
- ISO 3166 code: NO-1439

Vågsøy is a former municipality in the old Sogn og Fjordane county, Norway. The 177-square-kilometre (68 sq mi) municipality existed from 1964 until its dissolution in 2020. The area is now divided between Kinn Municipality and Stad Municipality in the traditional district of Nordfjord in Vestland county. The administrative centre was the town of Måløy. Other population centers in Vågsøy included the villages of Bryggja, Deknepollen, Holvika, Kvalheim, Langeneset, Raudeberg, Refvika, Silda, Tennebø, Totland, Vedvika, and Vågsvåg.

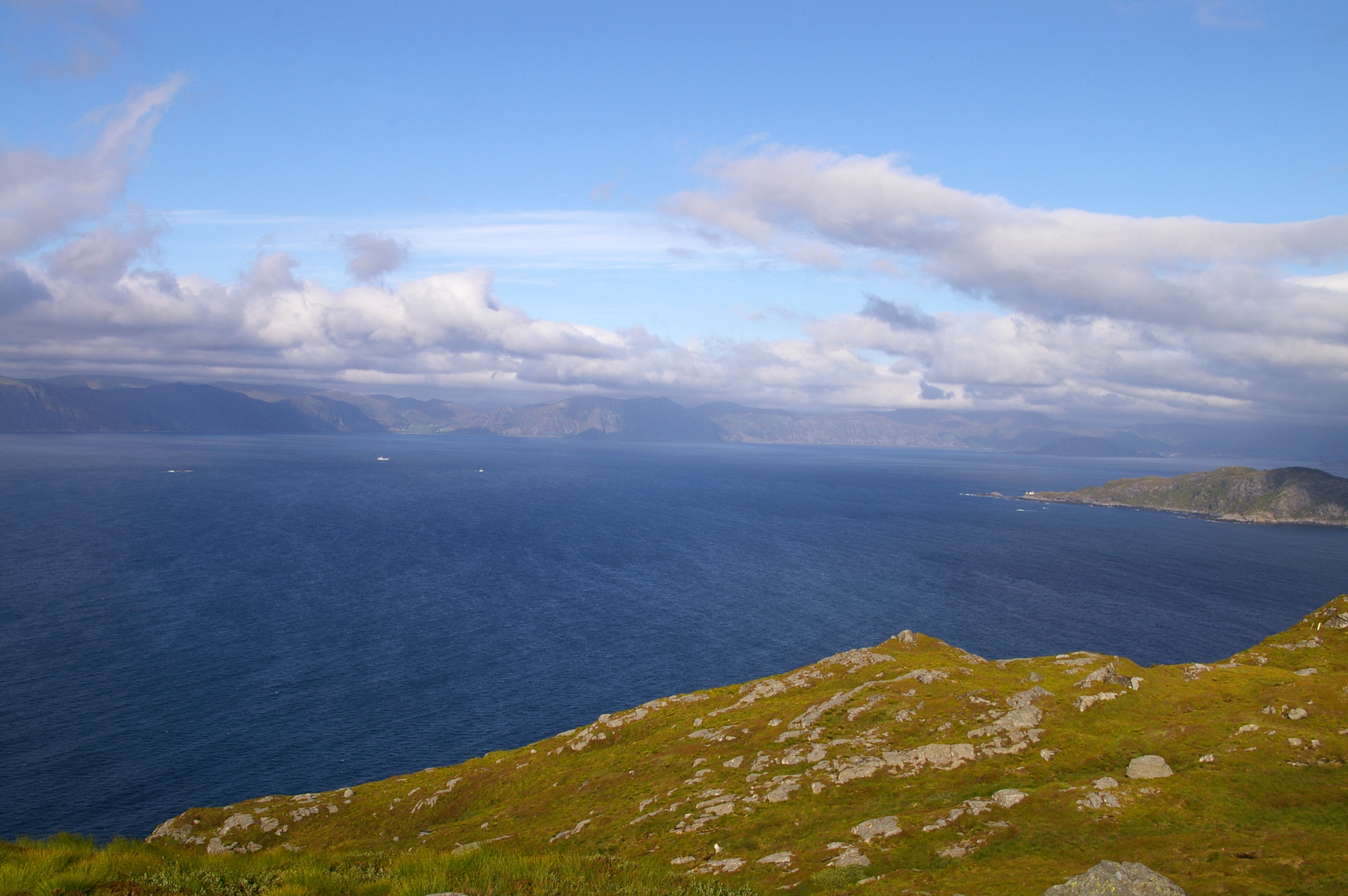
The bay Sildegapet

Prior to its dissolution in 2020, the 177-square-kilometre (68 sq mi) municipality was the 345th largest by area out of the 422 municipalities in Norway. Vågsøy Municipality was the 175th most populous municipality in Norway with a population of about 5,970. The municipality's population density was 33.8 inhabitants per square kilometre (88/sq mi) and its population had decreased by 0.3% over the previous 10-year period.

The municipality included the island of Vågsøy, several small surrounding islands, and part of the mainland. The municipality of Vågsøy was the second largest fishing municipality in Norway, and it was home to one of Norway's most modern fish-processing plants.

== General information ==
Historically, Vågsøy Municipality was originally a part of the old Selje Municipality (see formannskapsdistrikt law). On 1 January 1910, Selje Municipality was divided into three separate municipalities as follows:

- the southern part of the island of Vågsøy plus a portion of the mainland to the east of the island (population: 1,517) became Sør-Vågsøy Municipality
- the northern part of the island of Vågsøy (population: 1,111) became Nord-Vågsøy Municipality
- the rest of the old municipality (population: 3,367) continued on as a smaller Selje Municipality.

During the 1960s, there were many municipal mergers across Norway due to the work of the Schei Committee. On 1 January 1964, the following areas were merged to form the new Vågsøy Municipality with an initial population of 6,962:

- all of Sør-Vågsøy Municipality (population: 3,926)
- all of Nord-Vågsøy Municipality (population: 1,476)
- parts of Selje Municipality: the island of Silda, the Hagevik-Osmundsvåg area, and Sørpollen (population: 344)
- parts of Davik Municipality: the islands of Husevågøy, Grindøya, Gangsøya, and Risøya; and all of Davik that was north of the Nordfjorden and west of Lefdal (population: 1,216)

On 1 January 2020, Vågsøy Municipality was dissolved and its areas were divided among other municipalities as follows:

- The Bryggja-Totland area in the eastern part of Vågsøy Municipality was merged with the neighboring Eid Municipality and Selje Municipality to become the new Stad Municipality.
- The rest of Vågsøy Municipality was merged with Flora Municipality to the south to create a new (non-contiguous) Kinn Municipality.

=== Name ===
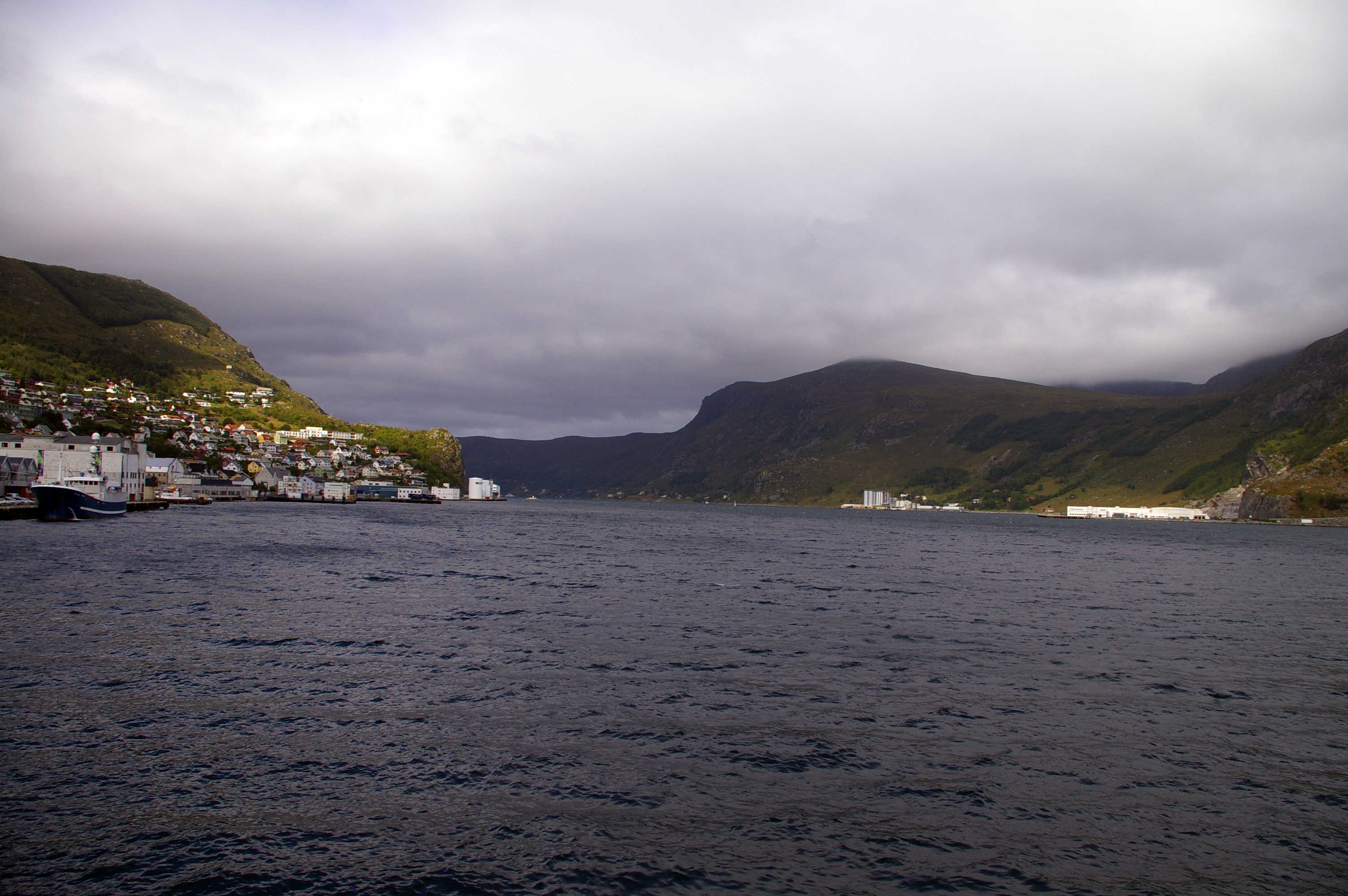
Ulvesundet at Måløy

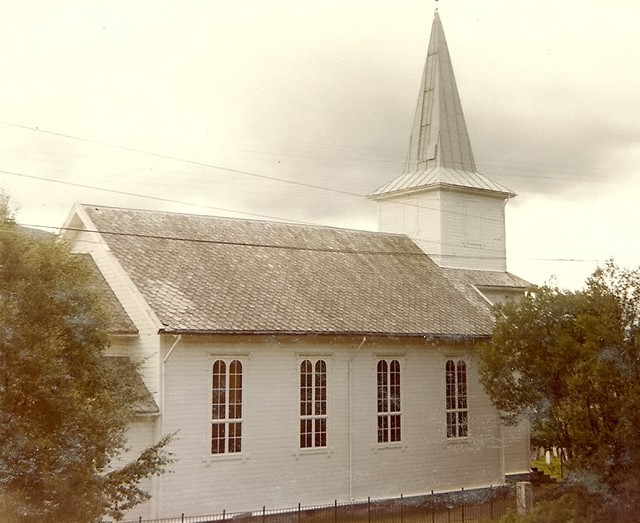
Totland Church

The municipality (originally the parish) is named after the island of Vågsøy (Old Norse: Vágsey). The first element is the genitive case of vágr which means "bay" or "inlet". The last element is ey which means "island".

=== Coat of arms ===
The coat of arms of Vågsøy was granted on 27 March 1987 and they were in use until 1 January 2020 when the municipality was dissolved. The official blazon was "Azure, two rudders in bend| argent" (Norwegian: I blått to skråstilte sølv ror). This means the arms have a blue field (background) and the charge is a set of two rudders lined up diagonally. The charge has a tincture of argent which means it is commonly colored white, but if it is made out of metal, then silver is used. The arms depict the type of rudders used in the one-man boats which have been used for a long time in this area. This design was chosen to symbolize "steering on land and sea". The arms were designed by Inge Rotevatn. The municipal flag has the same design as the coat of arms.

=== Churches ===
The Church of Norway has one parish (sokn) within Vågsøy Municipality. It is part of the Nordfjord prosti (deanery) in the Diocese of Bjørgvin.

Churches in Vågsøy Municipality
Parish (sokn)	Church name	Location of the church	Year built
Vågsøy	Nord-Vågsøy Church	Raudeberg	1960
Vågsøy	Sør-Vågsøy Church	Måløy	1907
Vågsøy	Totland Church	Totland	1912

== Government ==
While it existed, Vågsøy Municipality was responsible for primary education (through 10th grade), outpatient health services, senior citizen services, welfare and other social services, zoning, economic development, and municipal roads and utilities. The municipality was governed by a municipal council of directly elected representatives. The mayor was indirectly elected by a vote of the municipal council. The municipality was under the jurisdiction of the Sogn og Fjordane District Court and the Gulating Court of Appeal.

=== Municipal council ===
The municipal council (Kommunestyre) of Vågsøy Municipality was made up of representatives that were elected to four year terms. The tables below show the historical composition of the council by political party.

Vågsøy kommunestyre 2015–2019
Party name (in Nynorsk)	Number of representatives
Labour Party (Arbeidarpartiet)	6
Progress Party (Framstegspartiet)	2
Conservative Party (Høgre)	8
Christian Democratic Party (Kristeleg Folkeparti)	1
Red Party (Raudt)	1
Centre Party (Senterpartiet)	4
Liberal Party (Venstre)	3
Cross-party list for Vågsøy (Tverrpolitisk liste for Vågsøy)	2
Total number of members:	27
Note: On 1 January 2020, Vågsøy Municipality was divided between Kinn Municipality and Stad Municipality.

Vågsøy kommunestyre 2011–2015
Party name (in Nynorsk)	Number of representatives
Labour Party (Arbeidarpartiet)	3
Progress Party (Framstegspartiet)	4
Conservative Party (Høgre)	8
Christian Democratic Party (Kristeleg Folkeparti)	2
Centre Party (Senterpartiet)	4
Socialist Left Party (Sosialistisk Venstreparti)	1
Liberal Party (Venstre)	4
Bryggja List (Bryggjalista)	1
Total number of members:	27

Vågsøy kommunestyre 2007–2011
Party name (in Nynorsk)	Number of representatives
Labour Party (Arbeidarpartiet)	6
Progress Party (Framstegspartiet)	4
Conservative Party (Høgre)	3
Red Electoral Alliance (Raud Valallianse)	1
Centre Party (Senterpartiet)	7
Socialist Left Party (Sosialistisk Venstreparti)	1
Liberal Party (Venstre)	4
Bryggja List (Bryggjalista)	1
Total number of members:	27

Vågsøy kommunestyre 2003–2007
Party name (in Nynorsk)	Number of representatives
Labour Party (Arbeidarpartiet)	9
Progress Party (Framstegspartiet)	3
Conservative Party (Høgre)	2
Christian Democratic Party (Kristeleg Folkeparti)	2
Red Electoral Alliance (Raud Valallianse)	1
Centre Party (Senterpartiet)	4
Liberal Party (Venstre)	5
Bryggja List (Bryggjalista)	1
Total number of members:	27

Vågsøy kommunestyre 1999–2003
Party name (in Nynorsk)	Number of representatives
Labour Party (Arbeidarpartiet)	7
Progress Party (Framstegspartiet)	3
Conservative Party (Høgre)	5
Christian Democratic Party (Kristeleg Folkeparti)	4
Centre Party (Senterpartiet)	3
Liberal Party (Venstre)	13
Bryggja List (Bryggjalista)	2
Total number of members:	37

Vågsøy kommunestyre 1995–1999
Party name (in Nynorsk)	Number of representatives
Labour Party (Arbeidarpartiet)	6
Conservative Party (Høgre)	8
Christian Democratic Party (Kristeleg Folkeparti)	4
Centre Party (Senterpartiet)	4
Liberal Party (Venstre)	14
Common list for Bryggja (Samlingsliste for Bryggja)	1
Total number of members:	37

Vågsøy kommunestyre 1991–1995
Party name (in Nynorsk)	Number of representatives
Labour Party (Arbeidarpartiet)	6
Progress Party (Framstegspartiet)	2
Conservative Party (Høgre)	5
Christian Democratic Party (Kristeleg Folkeparti)	5
Red Electoral Alliance (Raud Valallianse)	1
Centre Party (Senterpartiet)	6
Liberal Party (Venstre)	4
Non-political mainland list (Upolitisk fastlandslist)	4
Common list for Bryggja (Samlingsliste for Bryggja)	2
Local list for Holvik and Våge/Oppedal (Bygdeliste for Holvik og Våge/Oppedal)	2
Total number of members:	37

Vågsøy kommunestyre 1987–1991
Party name (in Nynorsk)	Number of representatives
Labour Party (Arbeidarpartiet)	6
Progress Party (Framstegspartiet)	1
Conservative Party (Høgre)	10
Christian Democratic Party (Kristeleg Folkeparti)	4
Red Electoral Alliance (Raud Valallianse)	2
Centre Party (Senterpartiet)	1
Liberal Party (Venstre)	3
Non-political mainland list (Upolitisk fastlandslist)	4
Common list for Bryggja (Samlingsliste for Bryggja)	2
Common list for Nord-Vågsøy (Samlingsliste for Nord-Vågsøy)	4
Total number of members:	37

Vågsøy kommunestyre 1983–1987
Party name (in Nynorsk)	Number of representatives
Labour Party (Arbeidarpartiet)	8
Conservative Party (Høgre)	9
Christian Democratic Party (Kristeleg Folkeparti)	5
Red Electoral Alliance (Raud Valallianse)	2
Liberal Party (Venstre)	2
Non-party common list for North Vågsøy (Upolitisk samlingsliste for Nord-Vågsøy)	5
Non-party election list for Bryggja (Upolitisk valliste for Bryggja)	3
Non-party mainland list (Upolitisk Fastlandsliste)	3
Total number of members:	37

Vågsøy kommunestyre 1979–1983
Party name (in Nynorsk)	Number of representatives
Labour Party (Arbeidarpartiet)	6
Conservative Party (Høgre)	9
Christian Democratic Party (Kristeleg Folkeparti)	5
New People's Party (Nye Folkepartiet)	2
Centre Party (Senterpartiet)	1
Liberal Party (Venstre)	3
Non-party common list for North Vågsøy (Upolitisk samlingsliste for Nord-Vågsøy)	4
Non-party common list for the mainland (Upolitisk samlingsliste for fastlandet)	3
Common list for Almenningen and Bryggja (Samlingsliste for Almenningen og Bryggja)	3
Vågsvåg, Torskangerpoll, and Oppedal common list (Vågsvåg, Torskangerpoll og Oppedals fellesliste)	1
Total number of members:	37

Vågsøy kommunestyre 1975–1979
Party name (in Nynorsk)	Number of representatives
Labour Party (Arbeidarpartiet)	8
Conservative Party (Høgre)	5
Christian Democratic Party (Kristeleg Folkeparti)	8
New People's Party (Nye Folkepartiet)	3
Centre Party (Senterpartiet)	1
Liberal Party (Venstre)	2
Våge, Torskangerpoll, and Oppedal Common List (Våge, Torskangerpoll og Oppedals Felleslister)	1
Common list for the mainland, Almenningen, and Bryggja (Samlingsliste for Fastlandet, Almenningen og Bryggja)	6
Non-party Common List for North Vågsøy (Upolitisk Samlingsliste for Nord-Vågsøy)	3
Total number of members:	37

Vågsøy kommunestyre 1971–1975
Party name (in Nynorsk)	Number of representatives
Labour Party (Arbeidarpartiet)	8
Conservative Party (Høgre)	3
Christian Democratic Party (Kristeleg Folkeparti)	7
Liberal Party (Venstre)	3
Local List(s) (Lokale lister)	16
Total number of members:	37

Vågsøy kommunestyre 1967–1971
Party name (in Nynorsk)	Number of representatives
Labour Party (Arbeidarpartiet)	10
Conservative Party (Høgre)	4
Christian Democratic Party (Kristeleg Folkeparti)	4
Liberal Party (Venstre)	3
Local List(s) (Lokale lister)	16
Total number of members:	37

Vågsøy kommunestyre 1964–1967
Party name (in Nynorsk)	Number of representatives
Labour Party (Arbeidarpartiet)	5
Conservative Party (Høgre)	5
Joint List(s) of Non-Socialist Parties (Borgarlege Felleslister)	4
Local List(s) (Lokale lister)	23
Total number of members:	37

=== Mayors ===
The mayor (Nynorsk: ordførar) of Vågsøy Municipality was the political leader of the municipality and the chairperson of the municipal council. The following people have held this position:

- 1964–1965: Marius Larsen (H)
- 1966–1967: Leif Våge (V)
- 1968–1969: Leif Iversen (H)
- 1970–1977: Jon Lillestøl (KrF)
- 1978–1981: Otto Hoddevik (V)
- 1982–1983: Jon Lillestøl (KrF)
- 1984–1987: Rolf Domstein (H)
- 1988–1993: Olav Horn (Sp)
- 1994–1995: Anfinn Slinning (KrF)
- 1996–1999: Liv Henjum (V)
- 2000–2011: Roger Bernt Silden (Ap)
- 2011–2015: Morten Andreas Hagen (H)
- 2015–2019: Kristin Maurstad (Ap)

In 2007, Vågsøy Municipality participated in a trial where the mayor was directly elected. The sitting mayor, Roger B. Silden, received 44.1% of the votes and won the election. His party (the Norwegian Labour Party), however, did poorer than in 2003 and it became the second largest party with only 21.8% of the votes.

== Geography ==
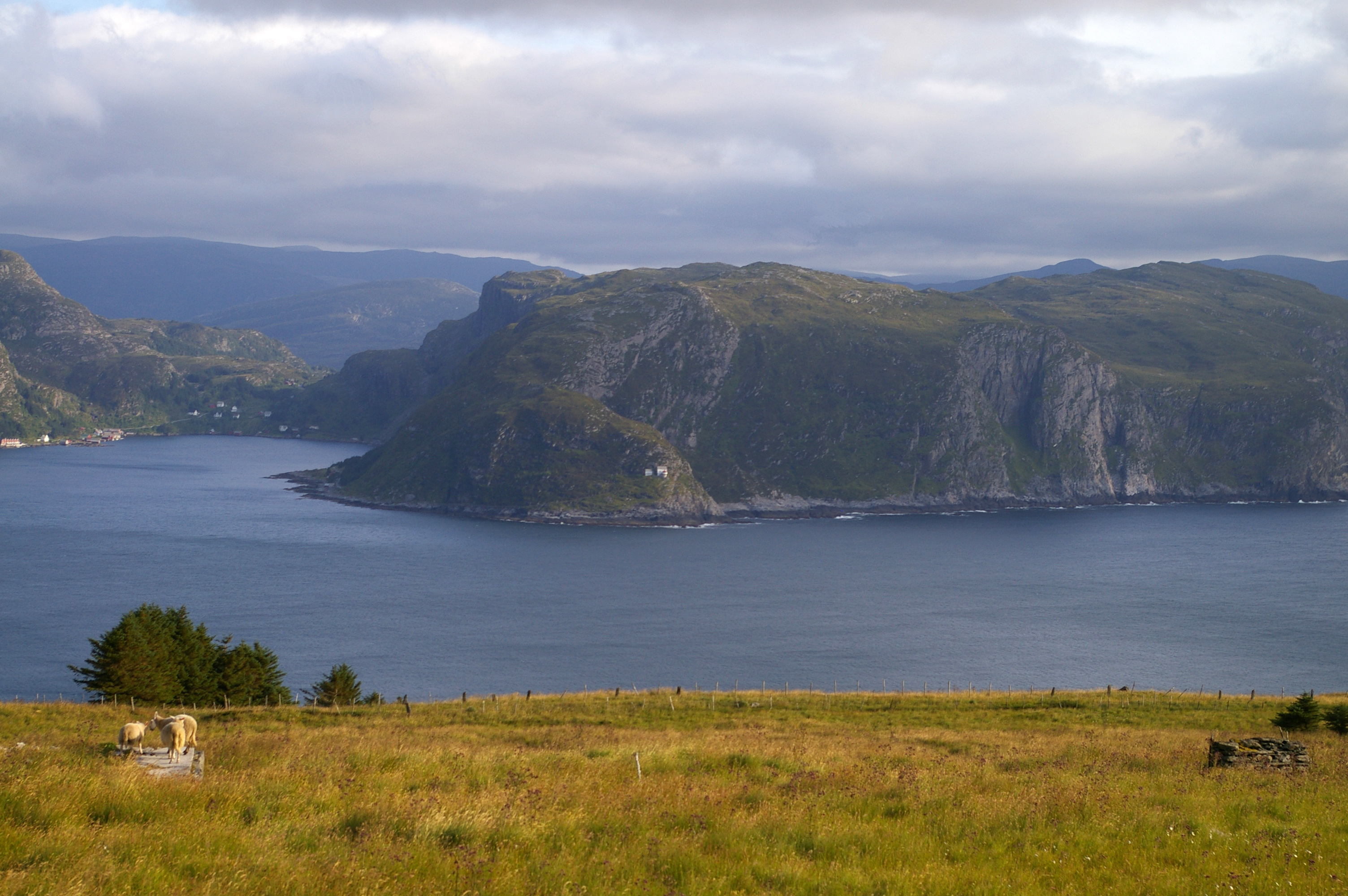
Hendanes

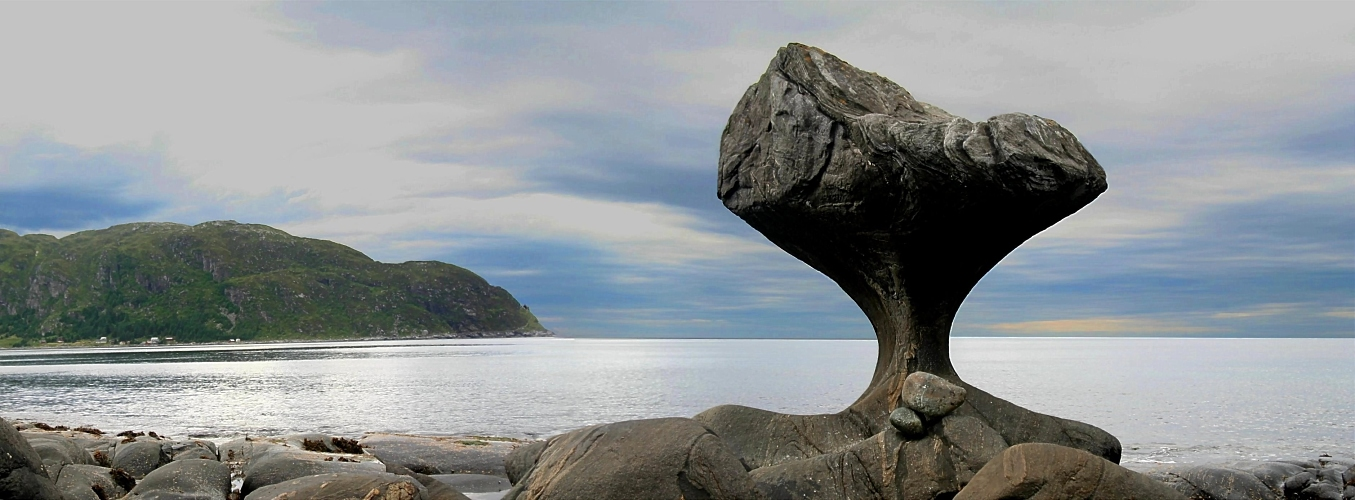
Kannestein

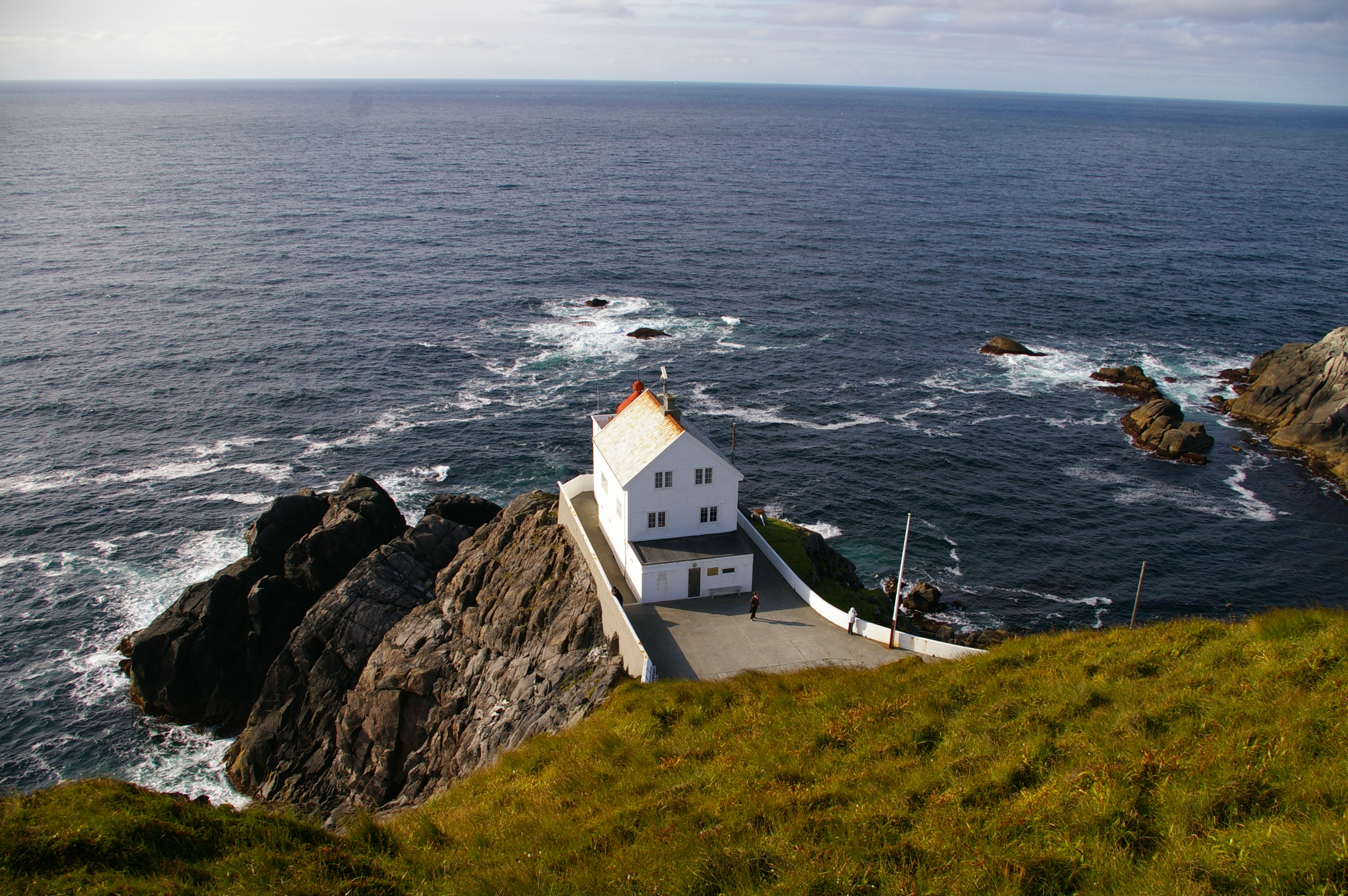
Kråkenes

Vågsøy Municipality encompassed areas on the mainland and islands on the northern and outer shore of the Nordfjorden. The municipality was named after its largest island, Vågsøy. Other populated islands in Vågsøy included Silda, Måløyna, and Husevågøy. The lake Deknepollvatnet was located between the villages of Deknepollen and Tennebø. The highest point in the municipality was the 689.1-metre (2,261 ft) tall mountain Sankta Synneva-hornet, located on the border with Selje Municipality.

Selje Municipality (in Sogn og Fjordane county) and Vanylven Municipality (in Møre og Romsdal county) bordered it to the north, Eid Municipality was located to the east, Bremanger Municipality was to the south, and the North Sea bordered Vågsøy Municipality to the west.

== Attractions ==
=== Måløy ===
Måløy attained city status in 1997. It lies along the Ulvesundet strait on the island of Vågsøy, and is joined to the mainland by the 1,224-metre (4,016 ft) long Måløy Bridge, a structure that forms a gateway for all seagoing traffic. The Coastal Steamer (Hurtigruten) has daily departures. The old part of the city lies on the island of Måløyna, from which the city that has expanded onto the mainland and further west to Holvika, has its name.

=== Kannestein ===
Over thousands of years, ocean waves have ground the rock to the shape it has today. It is located in the village of Oppedal, approximately 10 kilometres (6.2 mi) west of the center of Måløy. Every year many visitors come to Oppedal to take a closer look at the stone. The Kannestein or Kanne Stone was formed by loose stones and the pounding of the waves over a period of thousands of years, and stands today as a 4 to 5 metres (13 to 16 ft) high, narrow-footed rock. This is caused by stones having split loose, which have knocked and gnawed at the rockface until they have become polished and rounded. Loose stones have then worked themselves deeper into the rock. New stones have come, and in time the potholes have become deeper and wider. Several potholes near to each other have been polished for so long that the sides have been rubbed away, leaving just the middle section, such as the Kanne Stone.

=== Vågsberget trading post ===
In 1636, trader Didrik Fester from Bergen came to Vågsberget to open a trading business. There was probably trading activity and an inn before Fester's arrival, and the trading post at Vågsberget has changed hands several times throughout the years. Restoration work is being carried out on Vågsberget, but the café and exhibition is open in summer and guided tours are available. There is also an exhibition featuring old fishing boats and equipment. Vågsberget is now part of the large village of Vågsvåg.

=== Silda ===
Silda, the island in Sildagapet bay, is an old fishing community, which in its heyday had a population of 150 who made a living from fishing and farming. Its current winter population is only about 30, while in summer it is host to several hundred people, staying in holiday houses and cabins. The island has a restaurant perched on a rock out in the southern harbor. There are also cabins for rent there. The jetty in Silda's northern harbor was started in the 1860s and completed in the 20th century. With the exception of a few tractors, the island is "car free", but it has cycling and walking tracks, footpaths and walking terrain. A regular boat service runs to and from Måløy several times a day.

=== Lighthouses ===
Vågsøy Municipality had four lighthouses. Three of them are open daily and are available for let for short or long periods.

- Kråkenes Lighthouse is a working lighthouse and also a weather station that collects important information. Kråkenes lighthouse, which offers views of the ocean at Stadhavet, lies at the most northerly point on the island of Vågsøy and is accessible by road.
- Skongenes Lighthouse is an automatic lighthouse with no road access. It is a one-hour walk from Langeneset in easy hiking terrain. There are also views towards Stadlandet. Ytre Nordfjord Turlag runs this lighthouse and offers overnight accommodation and day visits.
- Hendanes Lighthouse is an automatic lighthouse on the west side of the Torskanger inlet. It is located a short walk from the road and offers views of Stadhavet and Klovningen.
- Ulvesund Lighthouse is a lighthouse located south of Stadlandet, about 10 kilometres (6.2 mi) north of Måløy. It was built in 1870, and was staffed until 1985 when it was automated.

=== Beaches ===
Refviksanden Beach is a 1.5 kilometres (0.93 mi) long beach. Refvika is approximately 10 kilometres (6.2 mi) from Måløy.

== See also ==
- Operation Archery
- List of former municipalities of Norway
