= Vågsøy =

Vågsøy or Vågsøya may refer to:

== Places ==
- Vågsøy (island), an island in Kinn Municipality in Vestland county, Norway
- Vågsøy Municipality, a former municipality in the old Sogn og Fjordane county, Norway
  - Nord-Vågsøy Municipality, a former municipality in the old Sogn og Fjordane county, Norway
  - Sør-Vågsøy Municipality, a former municipality in the old Sogn og Fjordane county, Norway
- Vågsøya, also called Linesøya, an island in Åfjord Municipality in Trøndelag county, Norway
- Vågsøya, an island in Tromsø Municipality in Troms county, Norway
- Vågsøy Strait, or Vågsøysundet, a strait in Tromsø Municipality in Troms county, Norway
