= Nord-Vågsøy Municipality =

Former municipality in Sogn og Fjordane, Norway

Nord-Vågsøy Municipality Nord-Vågsøy herad
- Former municipality
- Nord-Vaagsøy herred (historic name); Nordre Vaagsø herred (historic name)
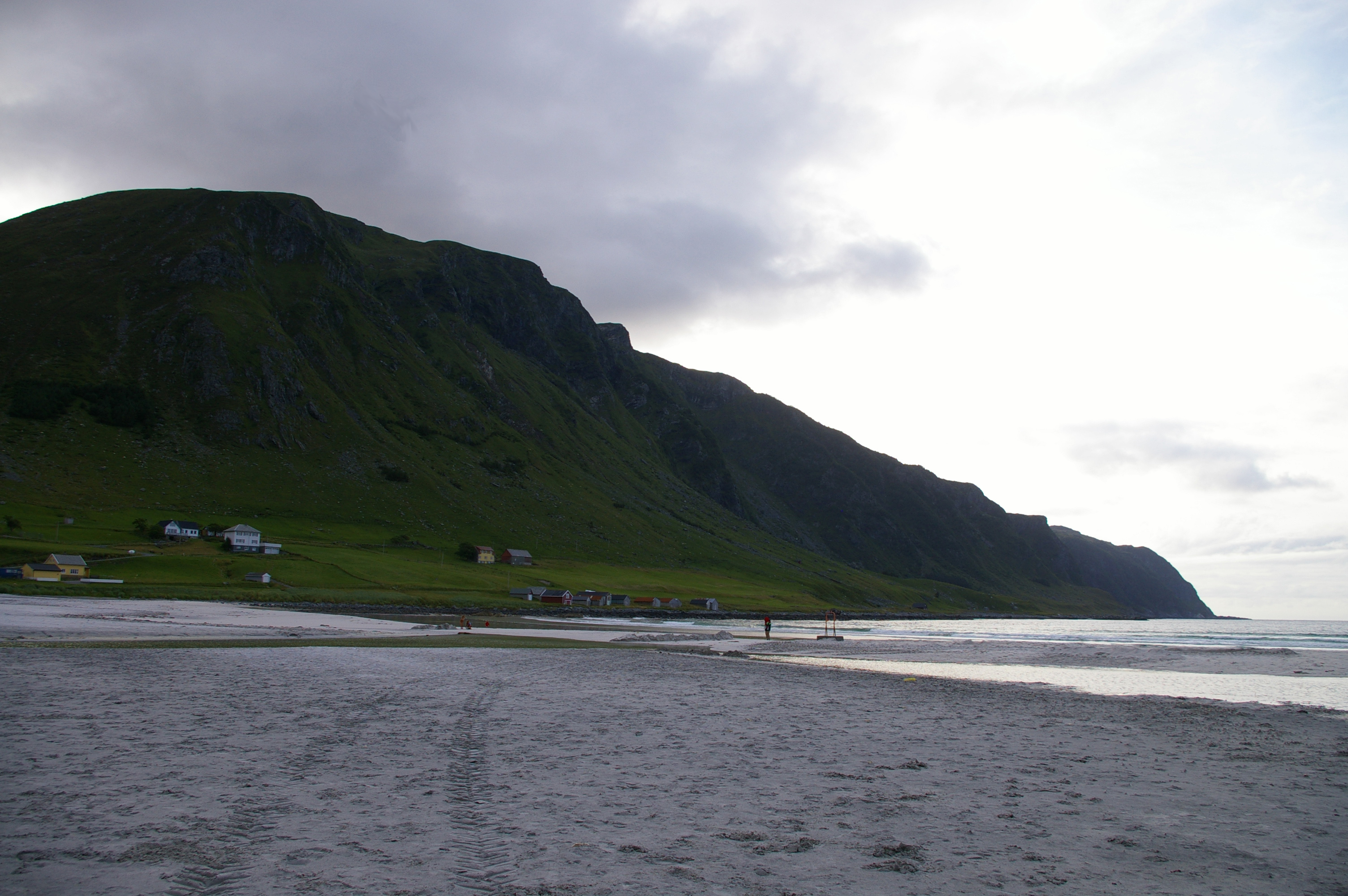
- View of Refvikstranda

- Sogn og Fjordane within Norway

- Nord-Vågsøy within Sogn og Fjordane
- Coordinates: 61°59′07″N 05°08′24″E
- Country: Norway
- County: Sogn og Fjordane
- District: Nordfjord
- Established: 1 Jan 1910
  - Preceded by: Selje Municipality
- Disestablished: 1 Jan 1964
  - Succeeded by: Vågsøy Municipality
- Administrative centre: Raudeberg

Government
  - Mayor (1945–1964): Leif Iversen (H)

Area (upon dissolution)
  - Total: 41.5 km^{2} (16.0 sq mi)
  - Rank: #596 in Norway
- Highest elevation: 504 m (1,654 ft)

Population (1963)
  - Total: 1,450
  - Rank: #544 in Norway
  - Density: 34.9/km^{2} (90/sq mi)
  - Change (10 years): ▲ +13.6%
- Demonym: Vågsøyværing

Official language
  - Norwegian form: Neutral
- Time zone: UTC+01:00 (CET)
  - Summer (DST): UTC+02:00 (CEST)
- ISO 3166 code: NO-1440

Nord-Vågsøy is a former municipality in the old Sogn og Fjordane county, Norway. The 41.5-square-kilometre (16.0 sq mi) municipality existed from 1910 until its dissolution in 1964. The area is now part of Kinn Municipality in the traditional district of Nordfjord in Vestland county. The administrative centre was the village of Raudeberg where the Nord-Vågsøy Church is located. Other villages in Nord-Vågsøy include Halsør, Vedvika, Refvika, Kvalheim, and Kråkenes.

Prior to its dissolution in 1963, the 41.5-square-kilometre (16.0 sq mi) municipality was the 596th largest by area out of the 689 municipalities in Norway. Nord-Vågsøy Municipality was the 544th most populous municipality in Norway with a population of about 1,450. The municipality's population density was 34.9 inhabitants per square kilometre (90/sq mi) and its population had increased by 13.6% over the previous 10-year period.

== General information ==
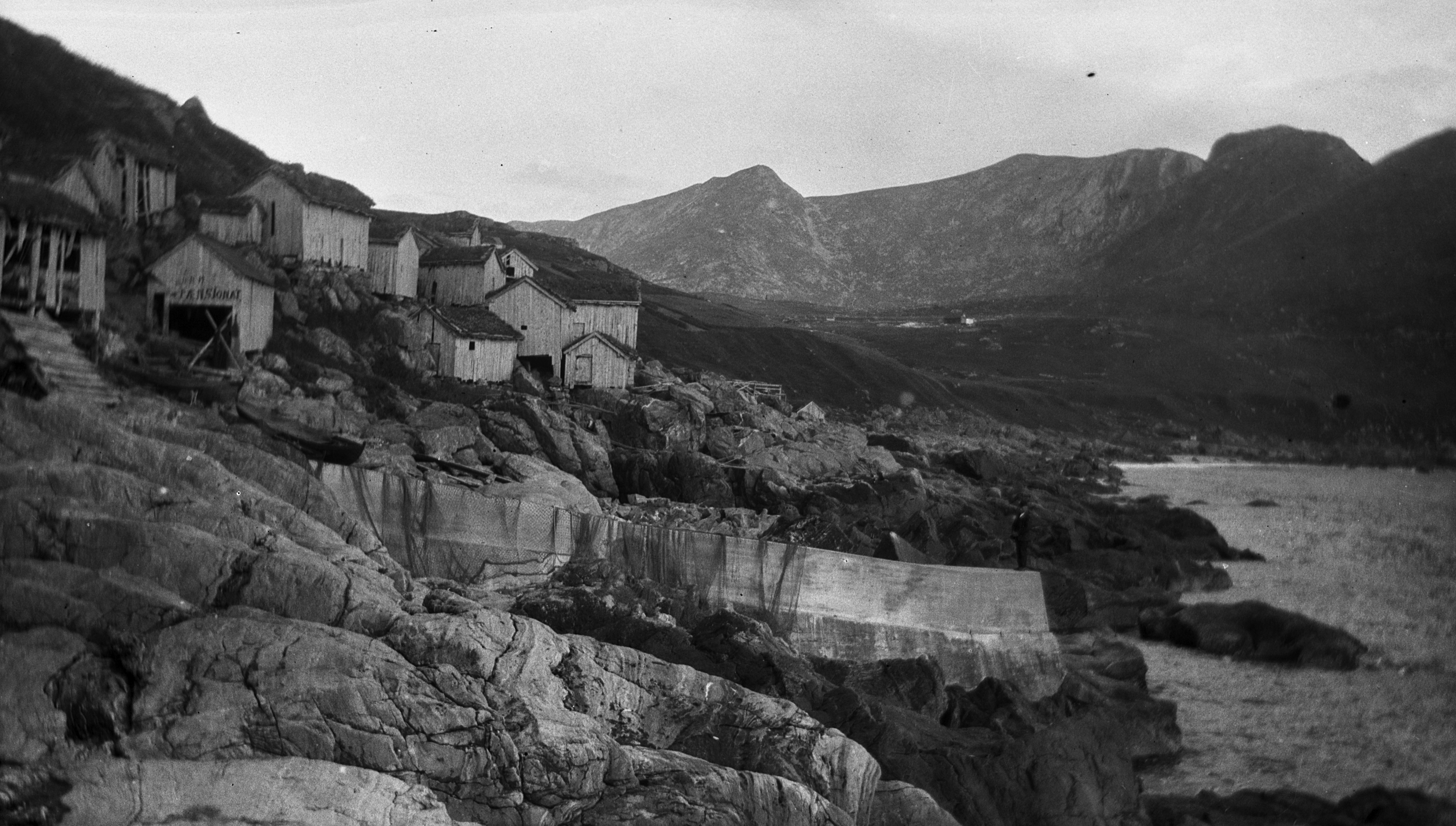
View of the Ytre Kvalheim area in 1914

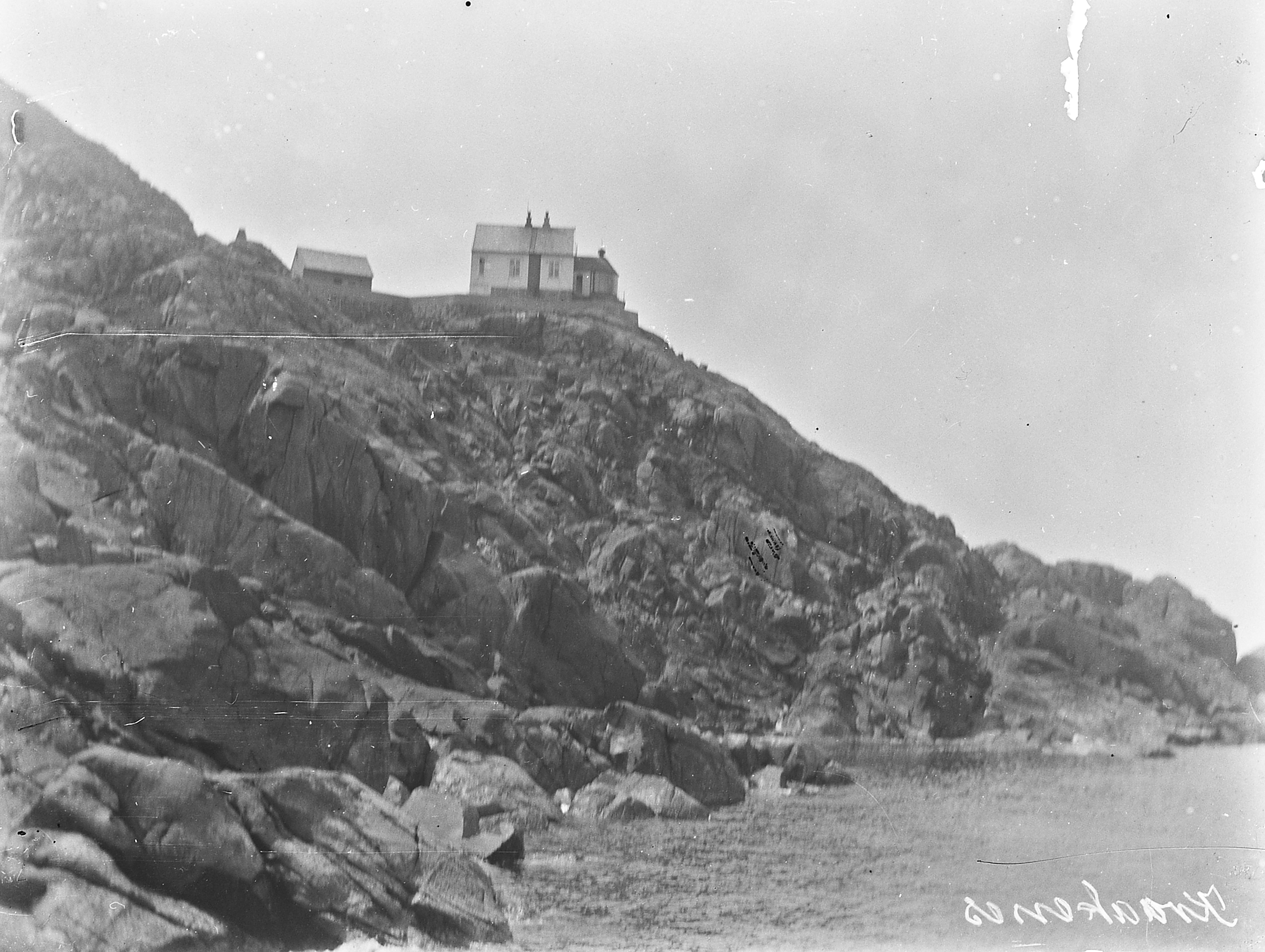
View of the Kråkenes Lighthouse

Nord-Vågsøy Municipality was originally a part of the old Selje Municipality (see formannskapsdistrikt law). On 1 January 1910, Selje Municipality was divided into three separate municipalities as follows:

- the northern part of the island of Vågsøy (population: 1,111) became Nord-Vågsøy Municipality
- the southern part of the island of Vågsøy plus a portion of the mainland to the east of the island (population: 1,517) became Sør-Vågsøy Municipality
- the rest of the old municipality (population: 3,367) continued on as a smaller Selje Municipality.

On 1 July 1921, the Blesrød farm in Nord-Vågsøy Municipality (just north of Måløy) was transferred to Sør-Vågsøy Municipality.

During the 1960s, there were many municipal mergers across Norway due to the work of the Schei Committee. On 1 January 1964, the following areas were merged to form the new Vågsøy Municipality:

- all of Nord-Vågsøy Municipality (population: 1,476)
- all of Sør-Vågsøy Municipality (population: 3,926)
- parts of Selje Municipality: the island of Silda, the Hagevik-Osmundsvåg area, and Sørpollen (population: 344)
- parts of Davik Municipality: the islands of Husevågøy, Grindøya, Gangsøya, and Risøya; and all of Davik that was north of the Nordfjorden and west of Lefdal (population: 1,216)

=== Name ===
The municipality is named Nord-Vågsøy since it encompasses the northern part of the island of Vågsøy (Old Norse: Vágsey). The prefix is nord which means "northern". The first element of the name is the genitive case of vágr which means "bay" or "inlet". The last element is ey which means "island".

Historically, the name of the municipality was spelled Nordre Vaagsø. On 3 November 1917, a royal resolution changed the spelling of the name of the municipality to Nord-Vaagsøy. The letter y was added to the end of the word to "Norwegianize" the name (ø is the Danish word for "island" and øy is the Norwegian word). The prefix was also modified from Nordre to Nord-, using an alternate way of spelling the same thing. On 21 December 1917, a royal resolution enacted the 1917 Norwegian language reforms. Prior to this change, the name was spelled Nord-Vaagsøy with the digraph "aa", and after this reform, the name was spelled Nord-Vågsøy, using the letter å instead.

=== Churches ===
The Church of Norway had one parish (sokn) within Nord-Vågsøy Municipality. At the time of the municipal dissolution, it was part of the Selje prestegjeld and the Nordfjord prosti (deanery) in the Diocese of Bjørgvin.

Churches in Nord-Vågsøy Municipality
Parish (sokn)	Church name	Location of the church	Year built
Nord-Vågsøy	Nord-Vågsøy Church	Raudeberg	1960

== Geography ==
The municipality encompassed the northern part of the island of Vågsøy. The highest point in the municipality was the 504-metre (1,654 ft) tall mountain Heida. Selje Municipality was located to the north and east, Sør-Vågsøy Municipality was located to the south, and the North Sea was located to the west.

== Government ==
While it existed, Nord-Vågsøy Municipality was responsible for primary education (through 10th grade), outpatient health services, senior citizen services, welfare and other social services, zoning, economic development, and municipal roads and utilities. The municipality was governed by a municipal council of directly elected representatives. The mayor was indirectly elected by a vote of the municipal council. The municipality was under the jurisdiction of the Gulating Court of Appeal.

=== Municipal council ===
The municipal council (Herredsstyre) of Nord-Vågsøy Municipality was made up of representatives that were elected to four year terms. The tables below show the historical composition of the council by political party.

Nord-Vågsøy herredsstyre 1959–1963
Party name (in Norwegian)	Number of representatives
Labour Party (Arbeiderpartiet)	2
Christian Democratic Party (Kristelig Folkeparti)	3
Local List(s) (Lokale lister)	12
Total number of members:	17
Note: On 1 January 1964, Nord-Vågsøy Municipality became part of Vågsøy Municipality.

Nord-Vågsøy herredsstyre 1955–1959
Party name (in Norwegian)	Number of representatives
Labour Party (Arbeiderpartiet)	3
Christian Democratic Party (Kristelig Folkeparti)	2
Local List(s) (Lokale lister)	12
Total number of members:	17

Nord-Vågsøy herredsstyre 1951–1955
Party name (in Norwegian)	Number of representatives
Labour Party (Arbeiderpartiet)	2
Local List(s) (Lokale lister)	14
Total number of members:	16

Nord-Vågsøy herredsstyre 1947–1951
Party name (in Norwegian)	Number of representatives
Local List(s) (Lokale lister)	16
Total number of members:	16

Nord-Vågsøy herredsstyre 1945–1947
Party name (in Norwegian)	Number of representatives
Labour Party (Arbeiderpartiet)	4
Local List(s) (Lokale lister)	12
Total number of members:	16

Nord-Vågsøy herredsstyre 1937–1941*
Party name (in Norwegian)	Number of representatives
Labour Party (Arbeiderpartiet)	3
Local List(s) (Lokale lister)	13
Total number of members:	16
Note: Due to the German occupation of Norway during World War II, no elections were held for new municipal councils until after the war ended in 1945.

=== Mayors ===
The mayor (Nynorsk: ordførar) of Nord-Vågsøy Municipality was the political leader of the municipality and the chairperson of the municipal council. Politically, Nord-Vågsøy Municipality was marked by the father and son Karl Iversen and Leif Iversen, who served as mayors for forty of the 54 years that the municipality was in existence. The following people have held this position: The mayors (Nynorsk: ordførar) of Nord-Vågsøy:

- 1910–1917: Olaf Refvik
- 1918–1925: Karl Iversen
- 1926–1929: Olaf Refvik
- 1929–1937: Karl Iversen
- 1937–1941: Leif Iversen (H)
- 1941–1941: Jon Sefland (NS)
- 1941–1942: Reinhart Horn (NS)
- 1942–1945: Ole Olsen (NS)
- 1945–1964: Leif Iversen (H)

== See also ==
- List of former municipalities of Norway
