= Leif Iversen =

Norwegian politician (1911–1989)

Leif Iversen (13 December 1911 – 18 May 1989) was a Norwegian politician for the Conservative Party.

Hailing from Raudeberg, Leif Iversen was a tax clerk before becoming mayor of Nord-Vågsøy Municipality in 1937. The previous mayor for fifteen years was his father Karl Iversen. Except for the years 1940–1945 during the German occupation of Norway, Leif Iversen held the mayor post until 1965, when Nord-Vågsøy Municipality was merged with Sør-Vågsøy Municipality to create the new Vågsøy Municipality.

He was also a member of Sogn og Fjordane county council, from 1938 to 1979, again except for the occupation years. He was thereby the longest-serving county politician in Sogn og Fjordane. He served as county mayor (fylkesordførar) from 1968 to 1975.

Among his various board memberships, he chaired the board which was responsible for the building of the Måløy Bridge.

Preceded by Nils Helgheim	County mayor of Sogn og Fjordane; 1968–1975	Succeeded by Ola M. Hestenes
