= Tornado Måløy FK =

Norwegian football club

- Full name: Tornado Måløy Fotballklubb
- Founded: 1 January 2003
- Ground: Refvik stadion, Refvika; Måløy stadion, Måløy
- League: Third Division
- 2011: Third Division / 8, 5th
Home colours

Tornado Måløy Fotballklubb is a Norwegian association football club from Vågsøy island in Kinn Municipality, Vestland county. It plays in both Måløy and Refvika, and the men's team is situated in the Third Division, the fourth tier of Norwegian football.

== History ==
The foundation of the club was agreed to in December 2002, as a merger between Tornado FK and Måløy IL. The merger was decided on the annual conventions of Tornado and Måløy, and 100% and 85% of the convention-goers in the respective clubs agreed to the merger. The team started its existence in the Third Division, and had both Refvik stadium and Måløy stadium as home fields.

Tornado was the better team before the merger. Måløy was a Fourth Division team at the time. Tornado had in the past fielded players like Geir Televik and the prolific goalscorer Eivind Iversen. After scoring 41 goals in 26 games in the 1996 season, Iversen had offers to join eleven clubs on higher levels. Iversen joined SK Brann, and Tornado stayed in the Third Division until 1998, when it won its group and was promoted to the 1999 Norwegian Second Division. The team remained there until 2002, when it was relegated. It was the seventh best home team, but the second worst away team. It was speculated that a bankruptcy of fellow Second Division team FK Lofoten might save Tornado Måløy, but the bankruptcy was avoided.

Tornado Måløy's first official match was a 2003 Norwegian Football Cup match (first preliminary round), which they won 3–0 against Sandane TIL. In the second preliminary round they lost 0–5 to Stryn TIL. The team ended in third place in its first season, behind IL Jotun and Stryn. In 2004 they came in fourth behind Førde IL, Stryn and Fjøra FK. They dropped another place, to fifth behind Stryn, Sogndal 2, Førde and Fjøra, in 2005. In 2006 they were back at fourth again, behind Stryn, Førde and Sogndal 2. In 2007 they ended in eighth place, their lowest ever placement. A fifth place in 2008, behind Førde, Årdal FK, Sogndal 2 and Fjøra, followed. In 2009 they achieved their best placement so far, with a second place, three points behind Førde. In 2010, they went one better, winning the Sogn og Fjordane section of the Third Division. However, they lost out on promotion after losing the playoff matches against Jevnaker. In 2011, there was 12 Third Division groups instead 24, and Tornado Måløy finished fifth in their group, behind Fana, Bjarg, FBK Voss and Årdal.

=== Results, men's team ===
Season		Pos.	Pl.	W	D	L	GS	GA	P	Cup	Notes
2003	3. Division, section 16	3	22	14	1	7	72	39	43	2nd qualifying round	
2004	3. Division, section 16	4	22	12	3	7	76	48	39	1st qualifying round	
2005	3. Division, section 16	5	22	10	4	8	66	48	34	1st qualifying round	
2006	3. Division, section 16	4	22	10	6	6	53	42	36	1st qualifying round	
2007	3. Division, section Sogn og Fjordane	8	22	8	2	12	52	69	26	1st qualifying round	
2008	3. Division, section Sogn og Fjordane	5	22	11	3	8	58	38	36	1st round	
2009	3. Division, section Sogn og Fjordane	2	22	15	2	5	68	29	47	1st round	
2010	3. Division, section Sogn og Fjordane	1	22	19	1	2	86	21	55	1st qualifying round	Lost playoffs for promotion
2011	3. Division, section 8	5	26	13	4	9	51	47	43	1st round	
2012	3. Division, section 8	10	26	10	2	14	42	62	32	1st round	
2013	3. Division, section 8									1st round	
