= Coat of arms of Vågsøy =

Coat of Arms of Vågsøy

The coat of arms of Vågsøy was an official symbol for the old Vågsøy Municipality in Sogn og Fjordane county, Norway which existed from 1964 until its dissolution in 2020 when it was split between Kinn Municipality and Stad Municipality. The coat of arms depicts two rudders in silver on a blue background. The rudders are of the special kind that are traditionally used on boats in the area. The arms symbolize guidance or control on land and sea. The coat of arms was designed by the artist Inge Rotevatn.
