= Langeneset, Vestland =

Village in Kinn Municipality, Norway

Langeneset
- Village
- Interactive map of Langeneset
- Location within Vestland Location within Norway
- Coordinates: 62.01099°N 5.13874°E
- Country: Norway
- Region: Western Norway
- County: Vestland
- District: Nordfjord
- Municipality: Kinn Municipality
- Elevation: 25 m (82 ft)
- Time zone: UTC+01:00 (CET)
  - Summer (DST): UTC+02:00 (CEST)
- Post Code: 6710 Raudeberg

Langeneset is a village in Kinn Municipality in Vestland county, Norway. It is located on the northeastern side of the island of Vågsøy on the shore of the Sildegapet bay. It is about 2 kilometres (1.2 mi) east of the villages of Vedvika and Refvika. The larger village of Raudeberg is located about 3.5 kilometres (2.2 mi) to the south. The small island of Silda is located about 2 kilometres (1.2 mi) east of Langeneset. Norwegian county road 622 runs through the village. The Skongenes Lighthouse is located about 2.5 kilometres (1.6 mi) north of Langeneset.
