= Nordfjord Folkeblad =

Norwegian newspaper

Nordfjord Folkeblad was a Norwegian newspaper, published in Måløy in Vestland county.

== History and profile ==
The paper was started in 1933 as the Liberal Party organ in outer Nordfjord, in competition with the conservative Fjordenes Tidende. To beat its competitor, it was soon expanded from two to three editions a week. It was edited by Per Osdal from 1933, then by J. M. Steffensen from 1936 until the newspaper was stopped in 1940 during the occupation of Norway by Nazi Germany. It resumed in 1948, but finally went defunct after its last issue on 5 January 1952.
