= Måløy =

Town in Vestland, Norway

- Town/City
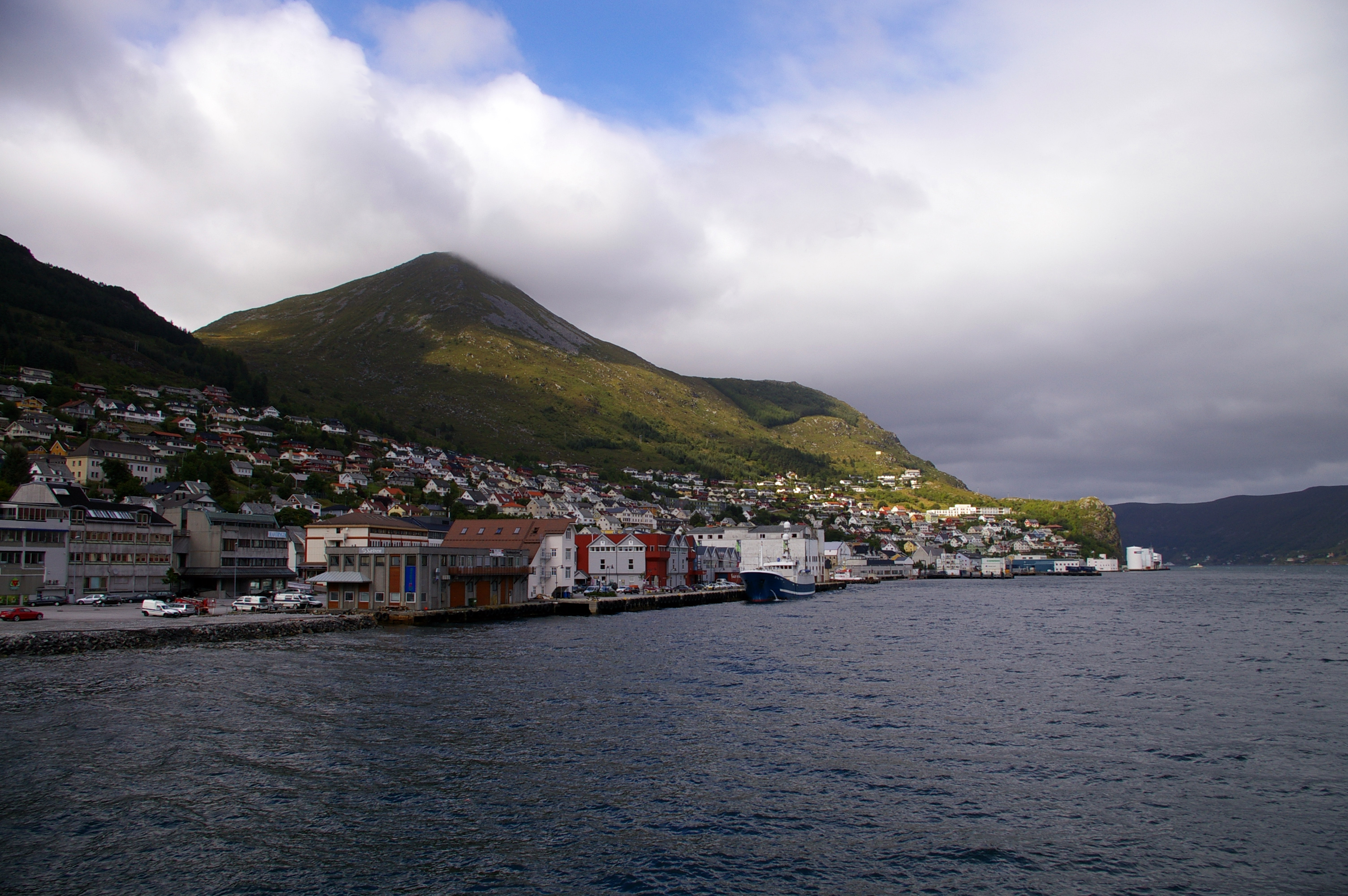
- View of the town
- Interactive map of Måløy
- Location within Vestland Location within Norway
- Coordinates: 61.93534°N 5.11366°E
- Country: Norway
- Region: Western Norway
- County: Vestland
- District: Nordfjord
- Municipality: Kinn Municipality
- Established as
- Town (By): 1997

Area
  - Total: 2.22 km^{2} (0.86 sq mi)
- Elevation: 3 m (9.8 ft)

Population (2024)
  - Total: 3,343
  - Density: 1,506/km^{2} (3,900/sq mi)
- Demonym: Måløyværing
- Time zone: UTC+01:00 (CET)
  - Summer (DST): UTC+02:00 (CEST)
- Post Code: 6700 Måløy

Måløy (Norwegian pronunciation: [ˈmôːɫœʏ]) is a town in Kinn Municipality in Vestland county, Norway. The town is located on the southeastern side of the island of Vågsøy, about 3 kilometres (1.9 mi) northeast of the village of Holvika and about 6 kilometres (3.7 mi) south of the village of Raudeberg. The Måløy Bridge connects the town centre to the area of Deknepollen on the mainland. Sør-Vågsøy Church is located in Måløy.

Måløy is one of the most important fishing ports in Norway. In 1997, the town was granted town status by the municipality. The 2.22-square-kilometre (550-acre) town has a population (2024) of 3,343 and a population density of 1,506 inhabitants per square kilometre (3,900/sq mi). Prior to 2020, the town was also the administrative centre of the old Vågsøy Municipality.

== History ==
View of Måløy town from the harbour

Måløy was founded as a trading center on the small island of Moldøen, or Måløya, on the Ulvesundet strait between Vågsøy island and the mainland. As trade flourished, the town gradually moved to the larger island of Vågsøy, while keeping the name of the smaller island. This is the cause of some confusion, although the smaller island is today often known as "Lisje-Måløyna" (literally smaller Måløy) or "Øyna" (literally the island). During World War II, it was used as a German coastal fortress, which led to the eradication of all settlement on the island to make room for the fortress, and as a result of Operation Archery in December 1941.

Måløy was the administrative centre of the old Sør-Vågsøy Municipality which existed from 1910 until 1964, and it was then made the administrative centre of the new Vågsøy Municipality which was created in 1964. In 2020, Vågsøy was merged with Flora Municipality to form the new Kinn Municipality. At that time, Måløy lost its administrative centre status.

== Townscape ==
The town square in Måløy has a monument remembering the citizens of Sør-Vågsøy Municipality and Davik Municipality who died in World War II. Another monument, located elsewhere in the town, is a memorial to Martin Linge, the only Norwegian who died during Operation Archery. Few streets in Måløy are named; most, especially the ones on the hillside, are only numbered.

== Climate ==
Måløy has an oceanic climate (Köppen classification: Cfb). Måløy has mild, rainy winters, small diurnal temperature differences and is windy. Although the village is slightly sheltered by the terrain compared to the nearby Kråkenes lighthouse, which holds the record for the strongest winds in Norway. There is no meteorological station with a long recording history in the village itself, but the stations at Kråkenes and Refvika have recordings since the 90's. Måløy has slightly colder winters and warmer summers than Kråkenes as a result of its more inland location. Måløy experiences a significant seasonal lag because of its location close to the Norwegian sea.

Climate data for Kråkenes Lighthouse 1991–2020 (75 m, precipitation from the Refvik station)
Month	Jan	Feb	Mar	Apr	May	Jun	Jul	Aug	Sep	Oct	Nov	Dec	Year
Daily mean °C (°F)	4.0 (39.2)	3.1 (37.6)	3.7 (38.7)	5.9 (42.6)	8.2 (46.8)	10.8 (51.4)	13.5 (56.3)	14.2 (57.6)	12.4 (54.3)	8.8 (47.8)	6.6 (43.9)	4.5 (40.1)	8.0 (46.4)
Average precipitation mm (inches)	182.2 (7.17)	160.4 (6.31)	136.6 (5.38)	94.1 (3.70)	89.3 (3.52)	96.3 (3.79)	112.6 (4.43)	160.5 (6.32)	201.5 (7.93)	197.6 (7.78)	189.9 (7.48)	211.6 (8.33)	1,832.6 (72.14)
Source: NOAA-WMO averages 91-2020 Norway

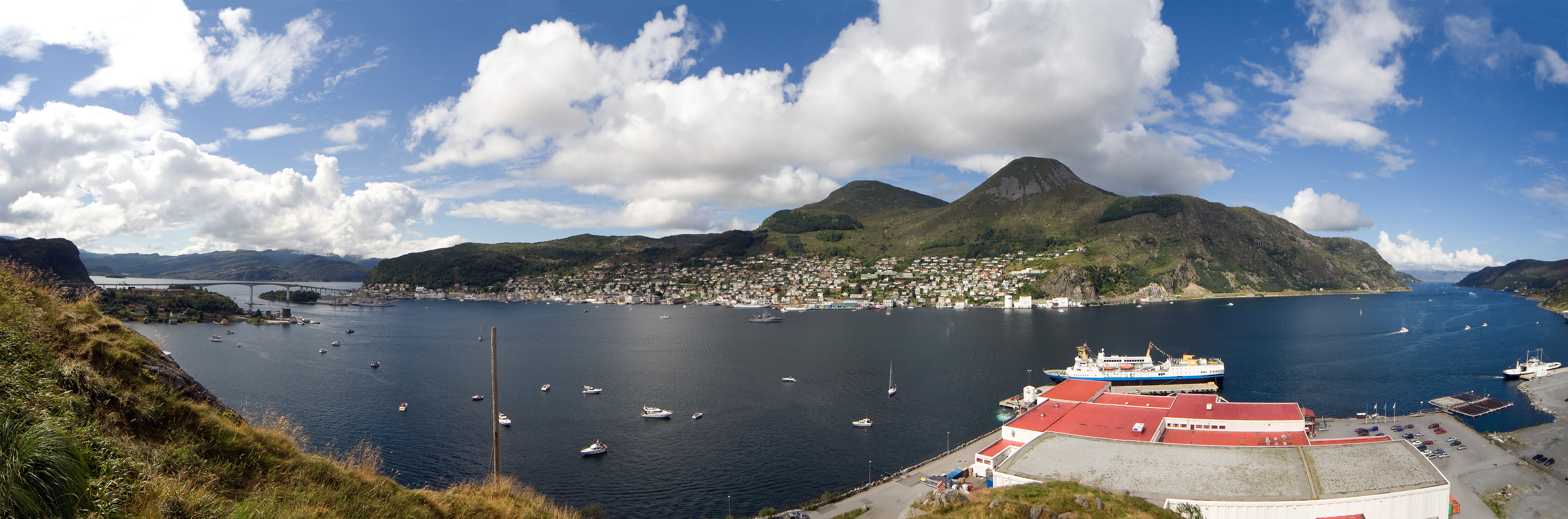
Panorama of Måløy

== Culture ==
The festival Måløydagene is arranged in the town every year. In 2004, Måløy was awarded the role as a 2008 Tall Ships' Races main port. The town was the host of the participating tall ships from July 28 until August 4. The event had a budget of 18 million kr, of which the county government would sponsor 2.5 million kr. The town offered great hospitality and welcomed crews warmly. The town, with STI had organized much in the way of crew activities.

=== Education ===
The only upper secondary school in the municipality, Måløy vidaregåande skule, as well as several lower secondary schools and elementary schools, are located in the vicinity of the town. The closest institutions of higher education are Western Norway University of Applied Sciences (located in Sogndalsfjøra, Førde, and Sandane), Norwegian University of Science and Technology (in Ålesund), and the University of Bergen (in Bergen).

=== Sports ===
The association football club Tornado Måløy FK is the result of a merger between the independent clubs Tornado and Måløy in 2002. The club has two stadiums, one of which is located in Måløy, the other is in Refvika. The club's two men's senior teams play in the Norwegian third division and fifth division as of 2008.

==== Transport ====
The ferry route between Måløy and Oldeide also serves Husevågøy on some departures and connects Måløy with Bremangerlandet to the south. The nearest airport to the town is Ålesund Airport, located 158 kilometres (98 mi) north east of Måløy.

== International relations ==
Måløy has a friendship agreement with the following "twin" towns:

- Lerwick, Shetland, Scotland

== See also ==
- List of towns and cities in Norway
- Nordfjord Folkeblad (1933–1952) newspaper
