= Sør-Vågsøy Municipality =

Former municipality in Sogn og Fjordane, Norway

Sør-Vågsøy Municipality Sør-Vågsøy herad
- Former municipality
- Sør-Vaagsøy herred (historic name); Søndre Vaagsø herred (historic name)
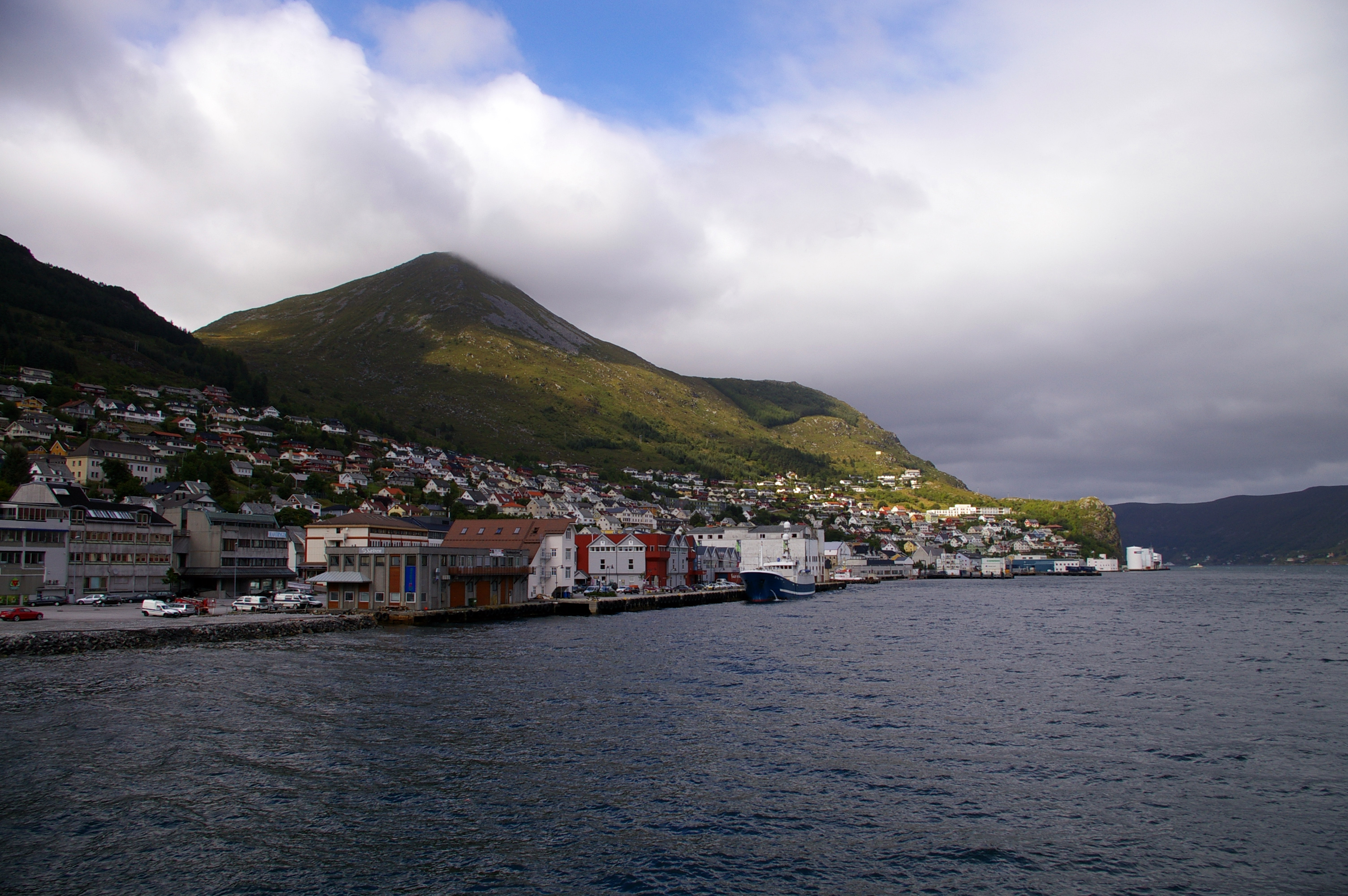
- View of Måløy

- Sogn og Fjordane within Norway

- Sør-Vågsøy within Sogn og Fjordane
- Coordinates: 61°56′07″N 05°05′49″E
- Country: Norway
- County: Sogn og Fjordane
- District: Nordfjord
- Established: 1 Jan 1910
  - Preceded by: Selje Municipality
- Disestablished: 1 Jan 1964
  - Succeeded by: Vågsøy Municipality
- Administrative centre: Måløy

Government
  - Mayor (1952–1964): Marius Larsen

Area (upon dissolution)
  - Total: 37.9 km^{2} (14.6 sq mi)
  - Rank: #603 in Norway
- Highest elevation: 652 m (2,139 ft)

Population (1963)
  - Total: 3,922
  - Rank: #224 in Norway
  - Density: 103.5/km^{2} (268/sq mi)
  - Change (10 years): ▲ +22.6%
- Demonym: Vågsøyværing

Official language
  - Norwegian form: Neutral
- Time zone: UTC+01:00 (CET)
  - Summer (DST): UTC+02:00 (CEST)
- ISO 3166 code: NO-1439

Sør-Vågsøy is a former municipality in the old Sogn og Fjordane county, Norway. The 37.9-square-kilometre (14.6 sq mi) municipality existed from 1910 until its dissolution in 1964. The area is now part of Kinn Municipality in the traditional district of Nordfjord in Vestland county. The administrative centre was Måløy where Sør-Vågsøy Church is located. Other population centres in the municipality included the villages of Holvika, Vågsvåg, Torskangerpoll, Færestrand, and Ytre Oppedal.

Prior to its dissolution in 1964, the 37.9-square-kilometre (14.6 sq mi) municipality was the 603rd largest by area out of the 689 municipalities in Norway. Sør-Vågsøy Municipality was the 224th most populous municipality in Norway with a population of about 3,922. The municipality's population density was 103.5 inhabitants per square kilometre (268/sq mi) and its population had increased by 22.6% over the previous 10-year period.

== General information ==
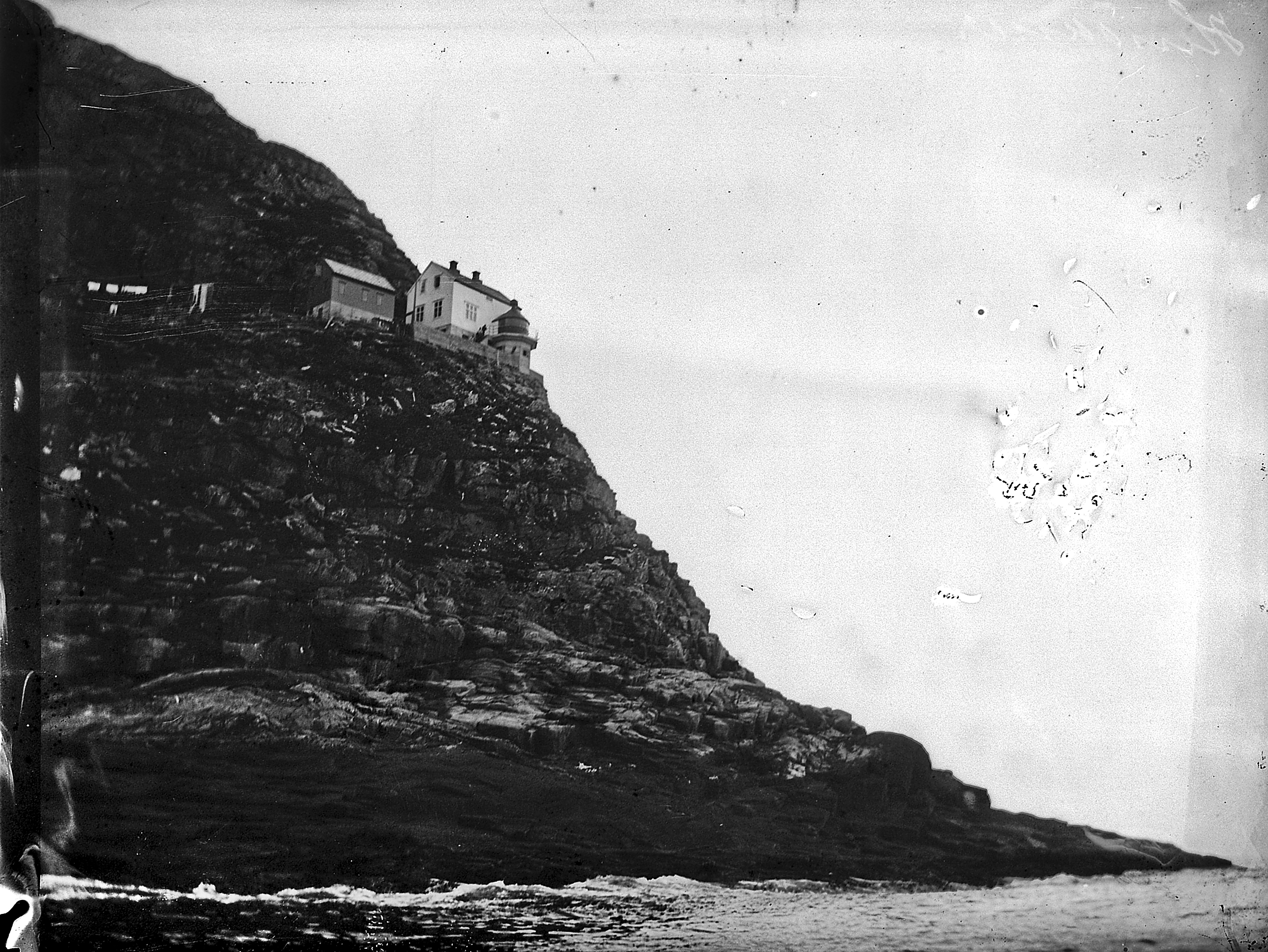
View of the Hendanes Lighthouse c. 1900

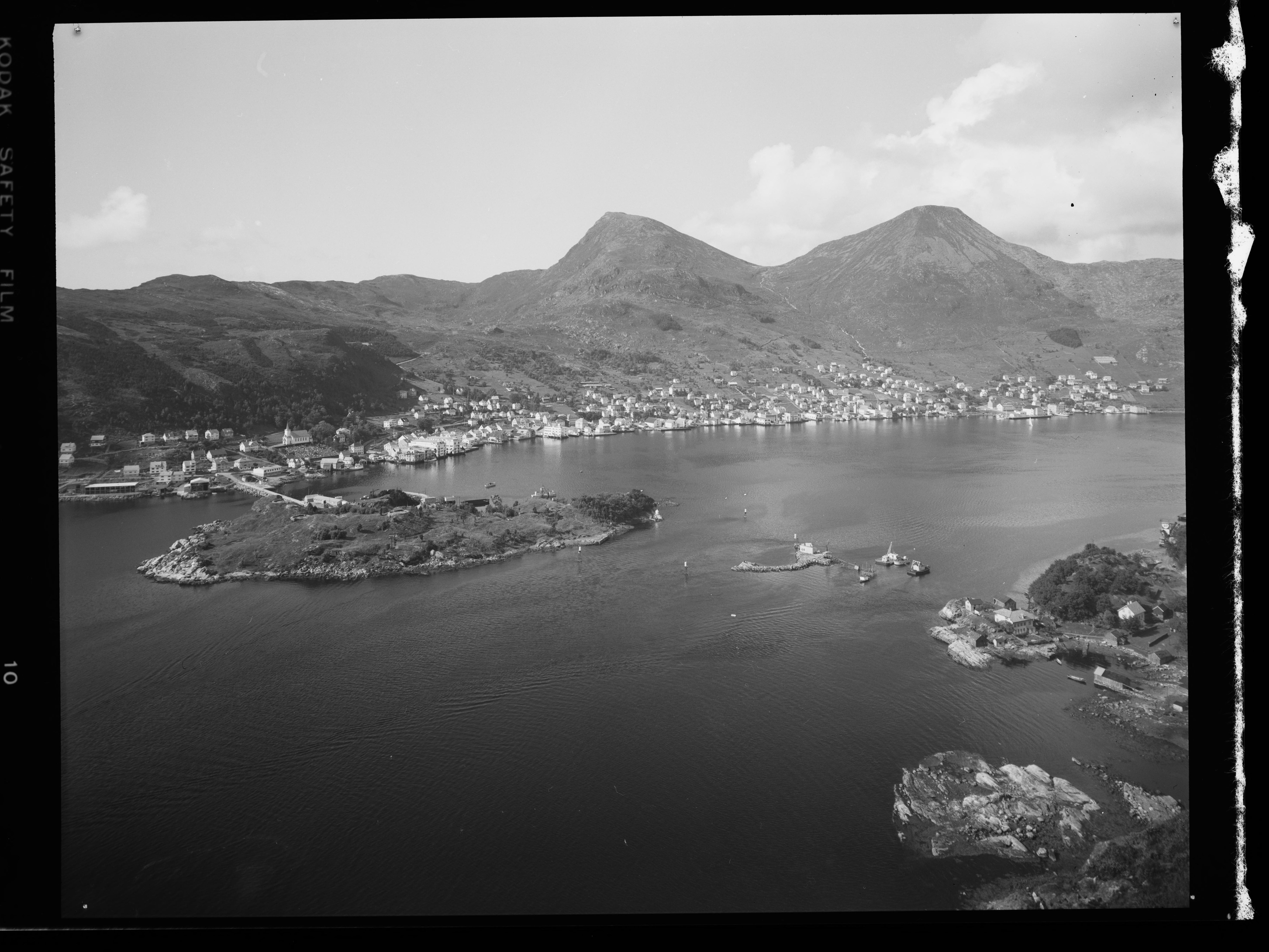
View of Måløy c. 1950s

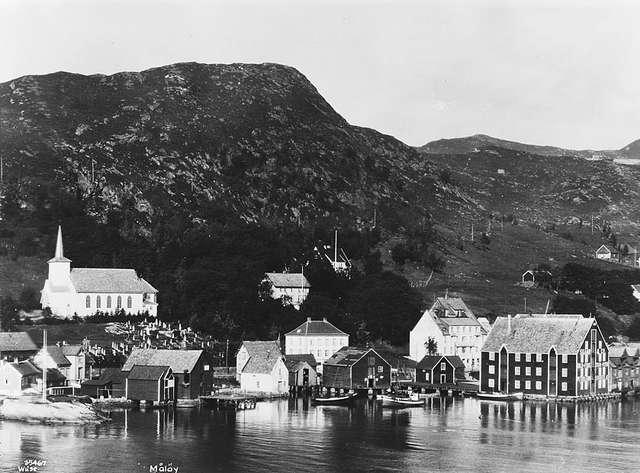
Sør-Vågsøy Church in Måløy (1930)

Sør-Vågsøy Municipality was originally a part of the old Selje Municipality (see formannskapsdistrikt law). On 1 January 1910, Selje Municipality was divided into three separate municipalities as follows:

- the southern part of the island of Vågsøy plus a portion of the mainland to the east of the island (population: 1,517) became Sør-Vågsøy Municipality
- the northern part of the island of Vågsøy (population: 1,111) became Nord-Vågsøy Municipality
- the rest of the old municipality (population: 3,367) continued on as a smaller Selje Municipality.

On 1 July 1921, the Blesrød farm in Nord-Vågsøy Municipality (just north of Måløy) was transferred to Sør-Vågsøy Municipality.

During the 1960s, there were many municipal mergers across Norway due to the work of the Schei Committee. On 1 January 1964, the following areas were merged to form the new Vågsøy Municipality:

- all of Sør-Vågsøy Municipality (population: 3,926)
- all of Nord-Vågsøy Municipality (population: 1,476)
- parts of Selje Municipality: the island of Silda, the Hagevik-Osmundsvåg area, and Sørpollen (population: 344)
- parts of Davik Municipality: the islands of Husevågøy, Grindøya, Gangsøya, and Risøya; and all of Davik that was north of the Nordfjorden and west of Lefdal (population: 1,216)

=== Name ===
The municipality is named Sør-Vågsøy since it encompasses the southern part of the island of Vågsøy (Old Norse: Vágsey). The prefix is sør which means "southern". The first element of the name is the genitive case of vágr which means "bay" or "inlet". The last element is ey which means "island".

Historically, the name of the municipality was spelled Søndre Vaagsø. On 3 November 1917, a royal resolution changed the spelling of the name of the municipality to Sør-Vaagsøy. The letter y was added to the end of the word to "Norwegianize" the name (ø is the Danish word for "island" and øy is the Norwegian word). The prefix was also modified from Søndre to Sør-, using an alternate way of spelling the same thing. On 21 December 1917, a royal resolution enacted the 1917 Norwegian language reforms. Prior to this change, the name was spelled Sør-Vaagsøy with the digraph "aa", and after this reform, the name was spelled Sør-Vågsøy, using the letter å instead.

=== Churches ===
The Church of Norway had one parish (sokn) within Sør-Vågsøy Municipality. At the time of the municipal dissolution, it was part of the Selje prestegjeld and the Nordfjord prosti (deanery) in the Diocese of Bjørgvin.

Churches in Sør-Vågsøy Municipality
Parish (sokn)	Church name	Location of the church	Year built
Sør-Vågsøy	Sør-Vågsøy Church	Måløy	1907

== Geography ==
The municipality encompassed the southern part of the island of Vågsøy and a small area on the mainland just east of the island. The highest point in the municipality was the 652-metre (2,139 ft) tall mountain Hanekammen, located on the border with Selje Municipality. Nord-Vågsøy Municipality was located to the north, Selje Municipality was located to the northeast, Davik Municipality was located to the east and south, and Bremanger Municipality was located to the southwest. The North Sea was located to the west.

== Government ==
While it existed, Sør-Vågsøy Municipality was responsible for primary education (through 10th grade), outpatient health services, senior citizen services, welfare and other social services, zoning, economic development, and municipal roads and utilities. The municipality was governed by a municipal council of directly elected representatives. The mayor was indirectly elected by a vote of the municipal council. The municipality was under the jurisdiction of the Gulating Court of Appeal.

=== Municipal council ===
The municipal council (Herredsstyre) of Sør-Vågsøy Municipality was made up of representatives that were elected to four year terms. The tables below show the historical composition of the council by political party.

Sør-Vågsøy herredsstyre 1959–1963
Party name (in Norwegian)	Number of representatives
Labour Party (Arbeiderpartiet)	6
Conservative Party (Høyre)	8
Christian Democratic Party (Kristelig Folkeparti)	2
Liberal Party (Venstre)	3
Local List(s) (Lokale lister)	10
Total number of members:	29
Note: On 1 January 1964, Sør-Vågsøy Municipality became part of Vågsøy Municipality.

Sør-Vågsøy herredsstyre 1955–1959
Party name (in Norwegian)	Number of representatives
Labour Party (Arbeiderpartiet)	7
Conservative Party (Høyre)	7
Joint List(s) of Non-Socialist Parties (Borgerlige Felleslister)	4
Local List(s) (Lokale lister)	11
Total number of members:	29

Sør-Vågsøy herredsstyre 1951–1955
Party name (in Norwegian)	Number of representatives
Labour Party (Arbeiderpartiet)	4
Conservative Party (Høyre)	4
Liberal Party (Venstre)	4
Local List(s) (Lokale lister)	8
Total number of members:	20

Sør-Vågsøy herredsstyre 1947–1951
Party name (in Norwegian)	Number of representatives
Labour Party (Arbeiderpartiet)	4
Liberal Party (Venstre)	2
Joint List(s) of Non-Socialist Parties (Borgerlige Felleslister)	3
Local List(s) (Lokale lister)	11
Total number of members:	20

Sør-Vågsøy herredsstyre 1945–1947
Party name (in Norwegian)	Number of representatives
Labour Party (Arbeiderpartiet)	3
Local List(s) (Lokale lister)	17
Total number of members:	20

Sør-Vågsøy herredsstyre 1937–1941*
Party name (in Norwegian)	Number of representatives
Labour Party (Arbeiderpartiet)	6
Liberal Party (Venstre)	2
Local List(s) (Lokale lister)	12
Total number of members:	20
Note: Due to the German occupation of Norway during World War II, no elections were held for new municipal councils until after the war ended in 1945.

=== Mayors ===
The mayor (Nynorsk: ordførar) of Sør-Vågsøy Municipality was the political leader of the municipality and the chairperson of the municipal council. The following people have held this position:

- 1910–1919: Kristen J. Sunde
- 1920–1922: Hans Søreide
- 1923–1925: Rasmus Sæternes
- 1926–1928: Jakob Myrestrand
- 1926–1940: Gabriel Bruvoll
- 1940–1941: Johan Gotteberg (NS)
- 1942–1945: Ingolf Hagevik (NS)
- 1945–1945: Gabriel Bruvoll
- 1946–1951: Hans Nystad
- 1952–1964: Marius Larsen

== See also ==
- List of former municipalities of Norway
