= Vedvika =

Village in Kinn Municipality, Norway

Vedvika Vedvik (unofficial)
- Village
- Interactive map of Vedvika
- Location within Vestland Location within Norway
- Coordinates: 62.01381°N 5.09905°E
- Country: Norway
- Region: Western Norway
- County: Vestland
- District: Nordfjord
- Municipality: Kinn Municipality
- Elevation: 8 m (26 ft)

Population (2001)
  - Total: 156
- Time zone: UTC+01:00 (CET)
  - Summer (DST): UTC+02:00 (CEST)
- Post Code: 6710 Raudeberg

Vedvika is a village in Kinn Municipality in Vestland county, Norway. The village is located on the north side of the island of Vågsøy, about 2 kilometres (1.2 mi) northeast of the village of Refvika, 3 kilometres (1.9 mi) west of Langeneset, and about 5 kilometres (3.1 mi) north of Raudeberg. The population (2001) of Vedvik is 156.

Historically, Vedvika was an agricultural village focusing on milk production and sheep, but today most residents commute to Raudeberg or Måløy to work. There is still some farming, but now it is mostly cattle.
