= Raudeberg =

Village in Kinn Municipality, Norway

- Village
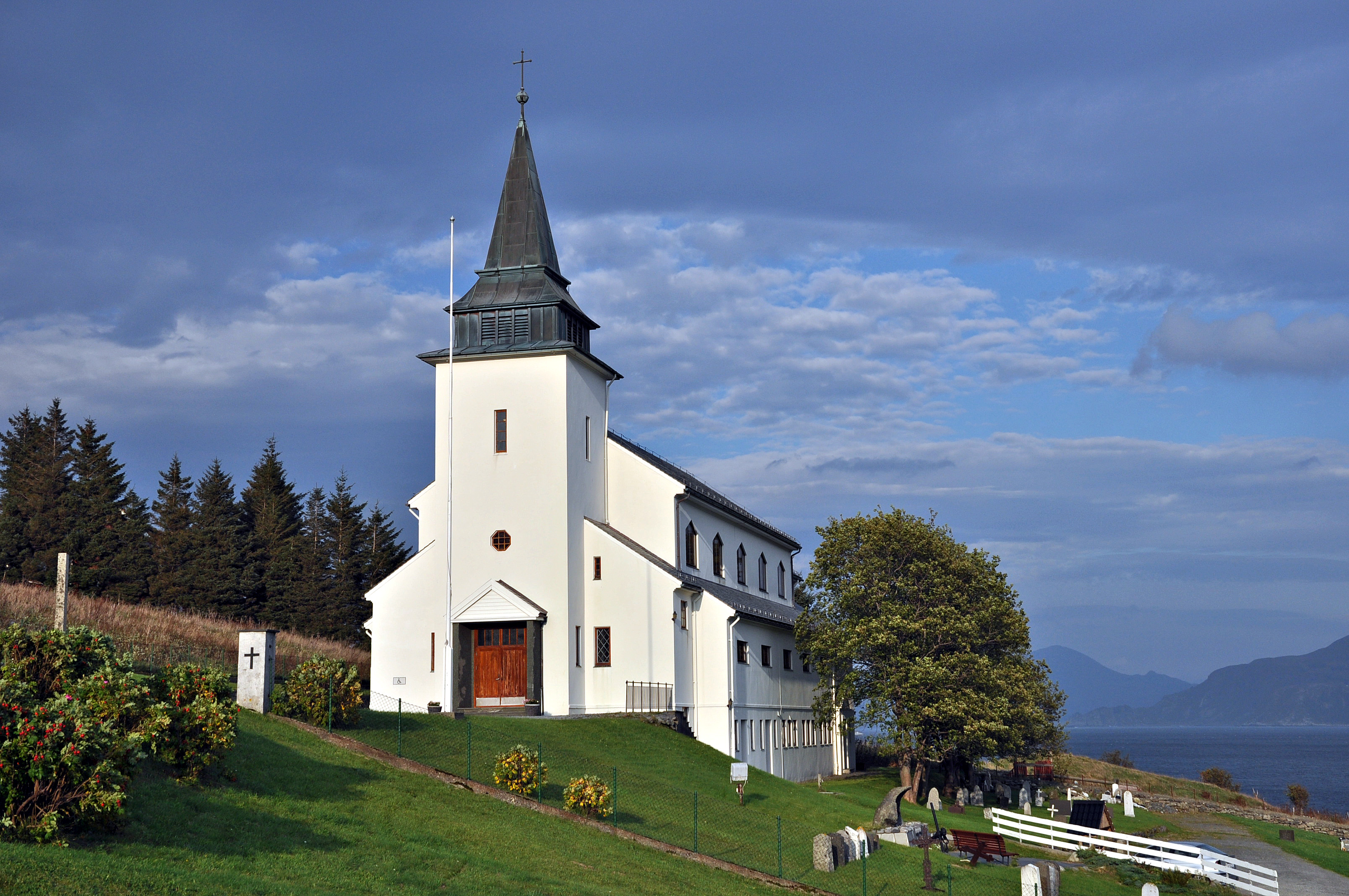
- View of the local church
- Interactive map of Raudeberg
- Location within Vestland Location within Norway
- Coordinates: 61.98501°N 5.13795°E
- Country: Norway
- Region: Western Norway
- County: Vestland
- District: Nordfjord
- Municipality: Kinn Municipality

Area
  - Total: 0.67 km^{2} (0.26 sq mi)
- Elevation: 5 m (16 ft)

Population (2024)
  - Total: 562
  - Density: 839/km^{2} (2,170/sq mi)
- Time zone: UTC+01:00 (CET)
  - Summer (DST): UTC+02:00 (CEST)
- Post Code: 6710 Raudeberg

Raudeberg is a village in Kinn Municipality in Vestland county, Norway. It is located on the east side of the island of Vågsøy. The villages of Refvika, Vedvika, and Langeneset are located a few kilometers to the north, and the town of Måløy is about 6 kilometres (3.7 mi) to the south. The island of Silda is located about 2 kilometres (1.2 mi) offshore to the northeast of the village of Raudeberg.

Nord-Vågsøy Church is located on the eastern edge of the village, right along the coast.

The 0.67-square-kilometre (170-acre) village has a population (2024) of 562 and a population density of 839 inhabitants per square kilometre (2,170/sq mi).

== History ==
Raudeberg (historically spelled Rødberg) was the administrative centre of the old Nord-Vågsøy Municipality, which existed from 1910 until 1964.
