= Skongenes Lighthouse =

Coastal lighthouse in Kinn, Norway

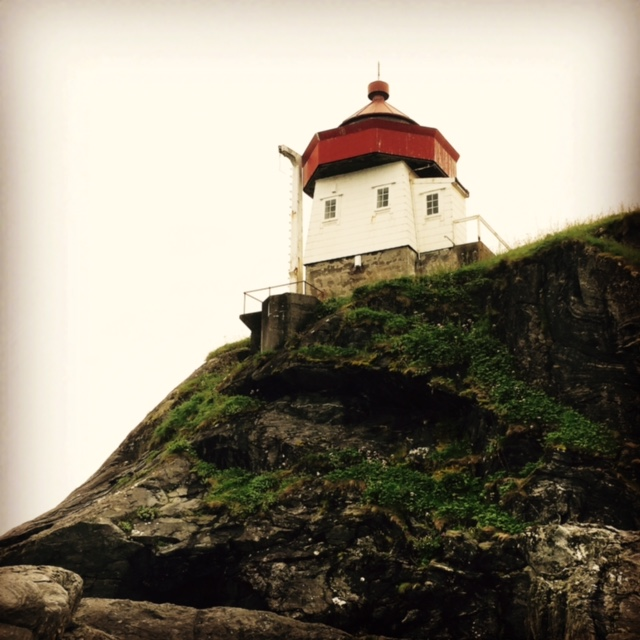
- Skongenes Lighthouse
- Location: Kinn Municipality; Vestland county Norway
- Coordinates: 62°01′57″N 5°07′25″E

Tower
- Constructed: 1870
- Construction: wooden tower
- Automated: 1985
- Height: 10 metres (33 ft)
- Shape: square tower with balcony and lantern
- Markings: white tower, red lantern

Light
- Focal height: 16 m (52 ft)
- Intensity: 25,700 candela
- Range: 12.8 nmi (23.7 km; 14.7 mi)
- Characteristic: Oc(2) WRG 8s

Skongenes Lighthouse (Norwegian: Skongenes fyr) is a coastal lighthouse located in Kinn Municipality in Vestland county, Norway. The lighthouse is located on the northern tip of the island of Vågsøy.

== History ==
It was first lit in 1870 and automated in 1985. The lighthouse is owned by the Norwegian Coastal Administration, and is run as tourist cabin by Ytre Nordfjord Turlag.

The 10-metre (33 ft) tall square wood tower is painted white with a red top. There is a 1 1/2-story wood keeper's house located nearby. The light can be seen for up to 12.8 nautical miles (23.7 km; 14.7 mi) and it emits a white, red, or green light, depending on direction, occulting twice every 8 seconds. The keeper's house is available for overnight accommodations, but the tower is closed to the public.

== See also ==
- List of lighthouses in Norway
- Lighthouses in Norway
