= Vågsøy (island) =

Island in Vestland, Norway

- Interactive map of Vågsøy

Geography
- Location: Vestland, Norway
- Coordinates: 61.9693°N 5.0832°E
- Area: 59.1 km^{2} (22.8 sq mi)
- Length: 12.5 km (7.77 mi)
- Width: 9.5 km (5.9 mi)
- Highest elevation: 613 m (2011 ft)
- Highest point: Veten

Administration
- Norway
- County: Vestland
- Municipality: Kinn Municipality

Demographics
- Population: 4207 (2001)

Vågsøy is an island in Kinn Municipality in Vestland county, Norway. The 59.1-square-kilometre (22.8 sq mi) island lies on the northern side of the mouth of the Nordfjorden, the sixth longest fjord in Norway. The Stadlandet peninsula lies to the north of the island, the islands of Silda and Barmøya and the mainland lie to the east of the island, the island of Husevågøy lies to the south (in the middle of the mouth of the Nordfjorden), and the open ocean (North Sea) lies to the west. Since the island lies along the open ocean, which can be rough, there are several lighthouses along the coastline of the island, including: Hendanes Lighthouse, Kråkenes Lighthouse, and Skongenes Lighthouse. The highest point on the island is the 613-metre (2,011 ft) tall Veten.

The island is connected to the mainland by the Måløy Bridge. The main population centre on the island is the town of Måløy. Other population centres are the villages of Raudeberg, Kvalheim, Langenes, Refvik, Vågsvåg, and Vedvik. The population (2001) of the whole island was 4,207. There are 2 churches on the island: Nord-Vågsøy Church in Raudeberg and Sør-Vågsøy Church in Måløy.

== History ==
The island was historically part of the old Selje Municipality (and the Selje prestegjeld before that). In 1910, the island was divided by the creation of two new municipalities: Sør-Vågsøy Municipality in the south and Nord-Vågsøy Municipality in the north. In 1964, the two municipalities on the island were merged to for the new Vågsøy Municipality. In 2020, Vågsøy Municipality became part of Kinn Municipality.

== Media gallery ==
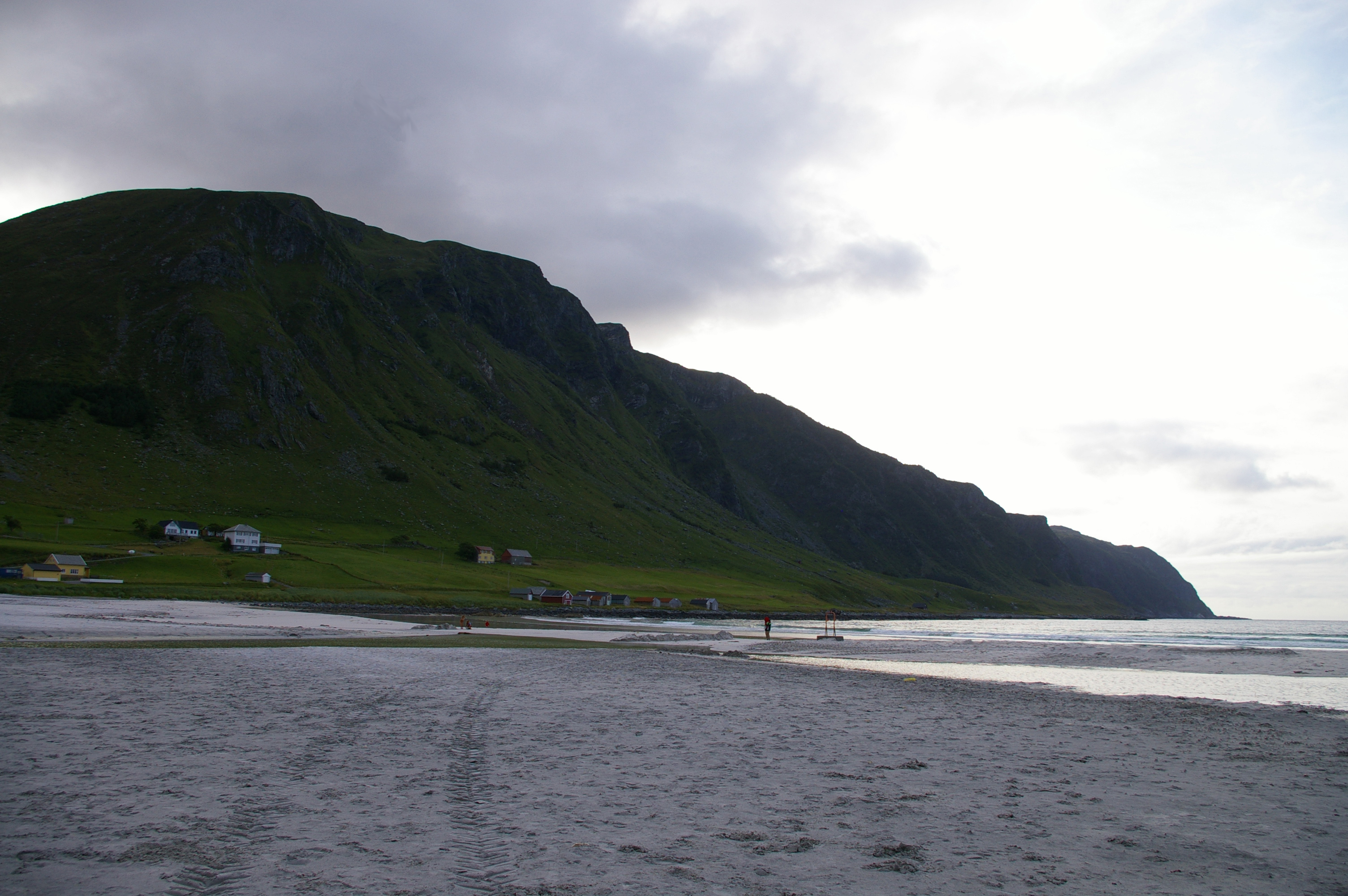
View of the Refvik beach

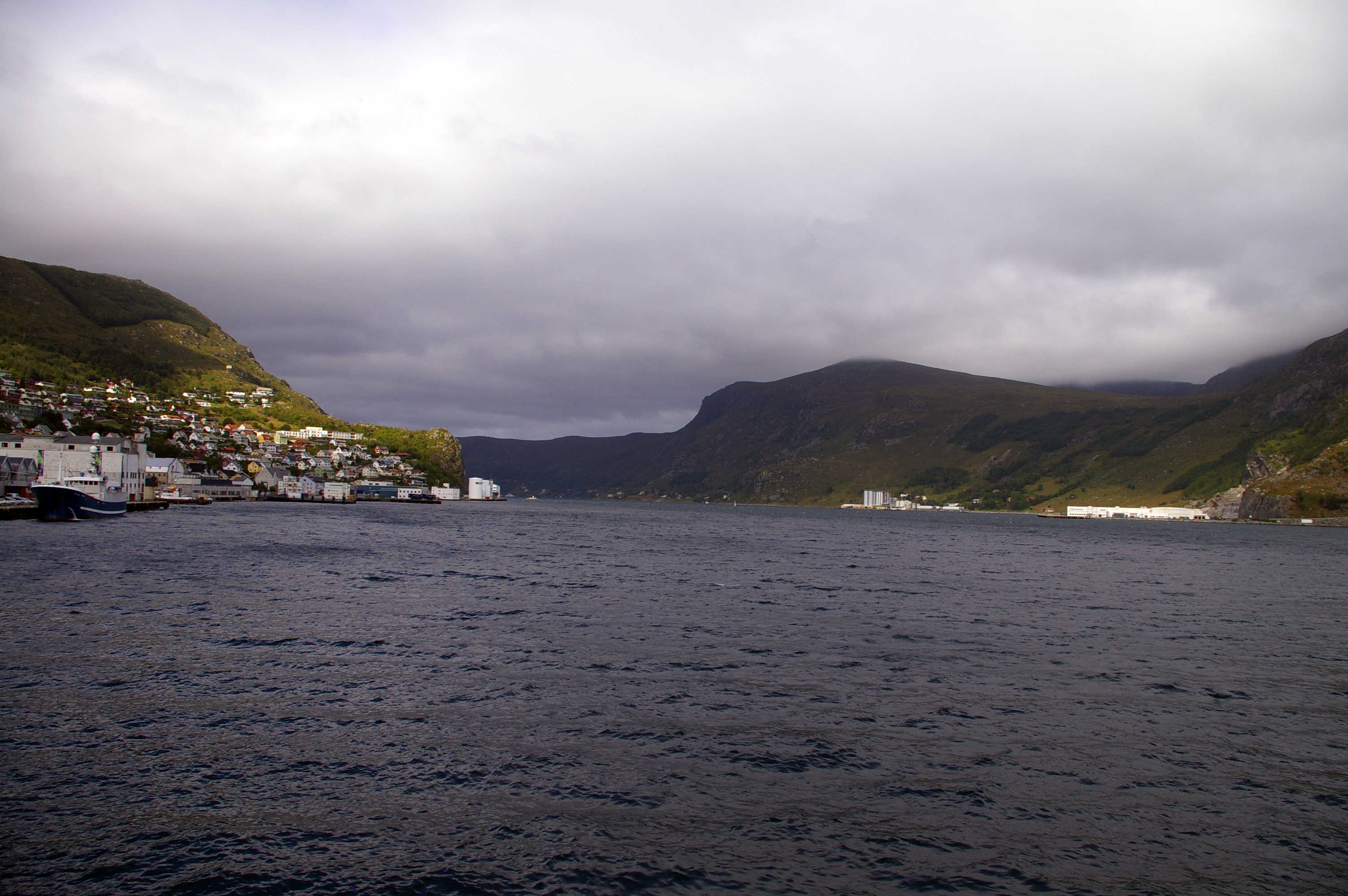
Looking north, Måløy on Vågsøy island is to the left

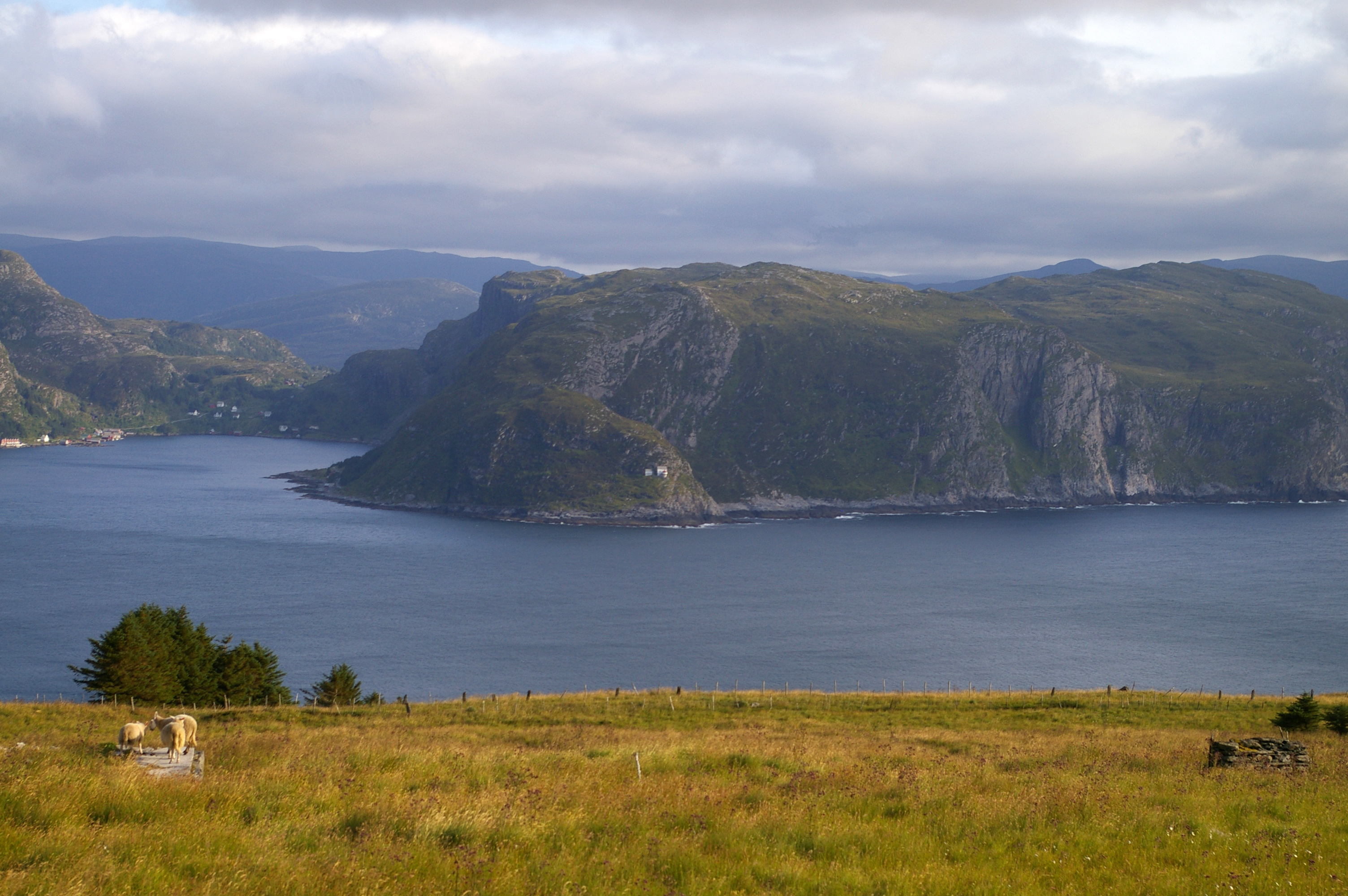
Looking south from Kvalheim towards Hendanes Lighthouse

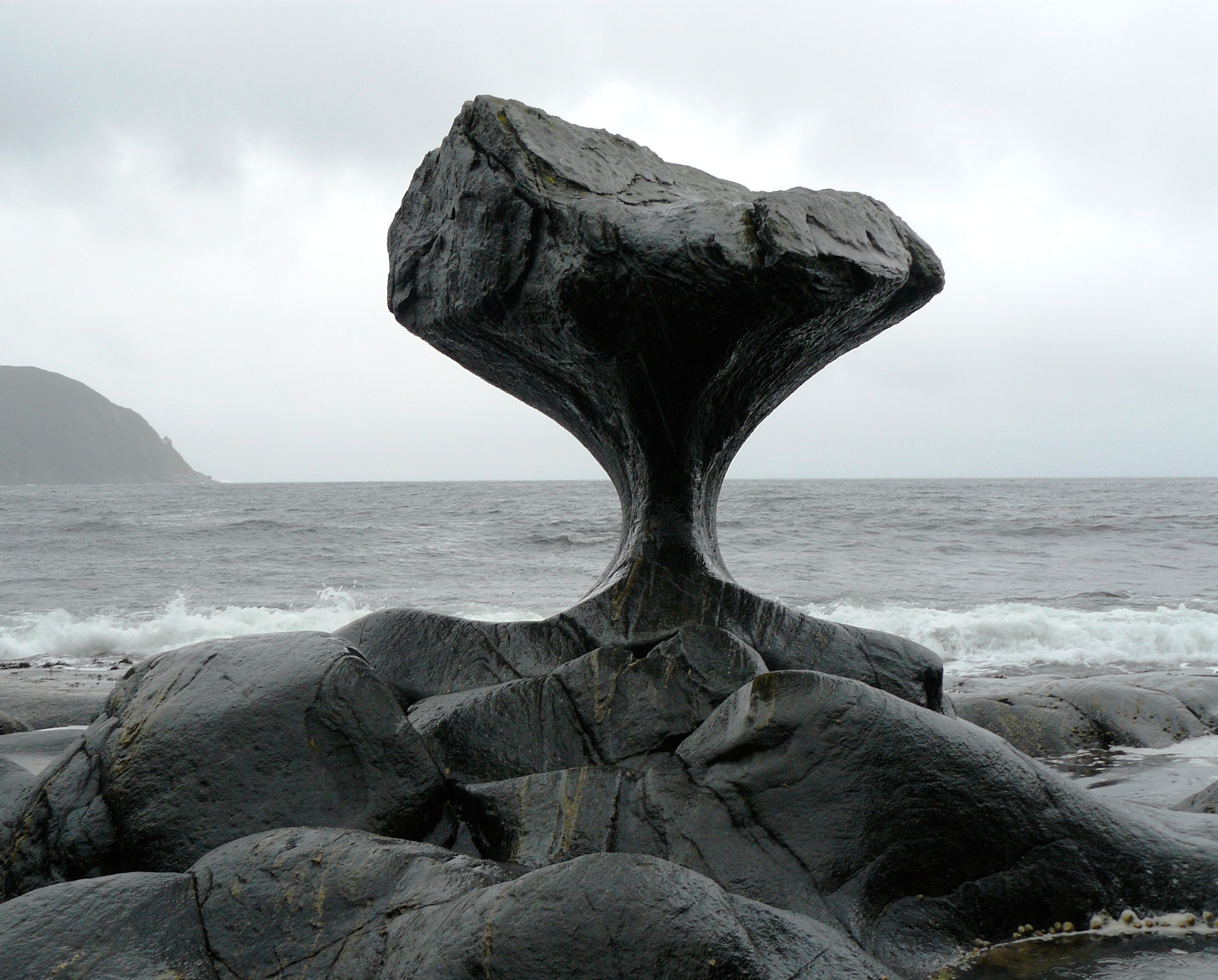
Kannesteinen rock, along the shore of Vågsøy

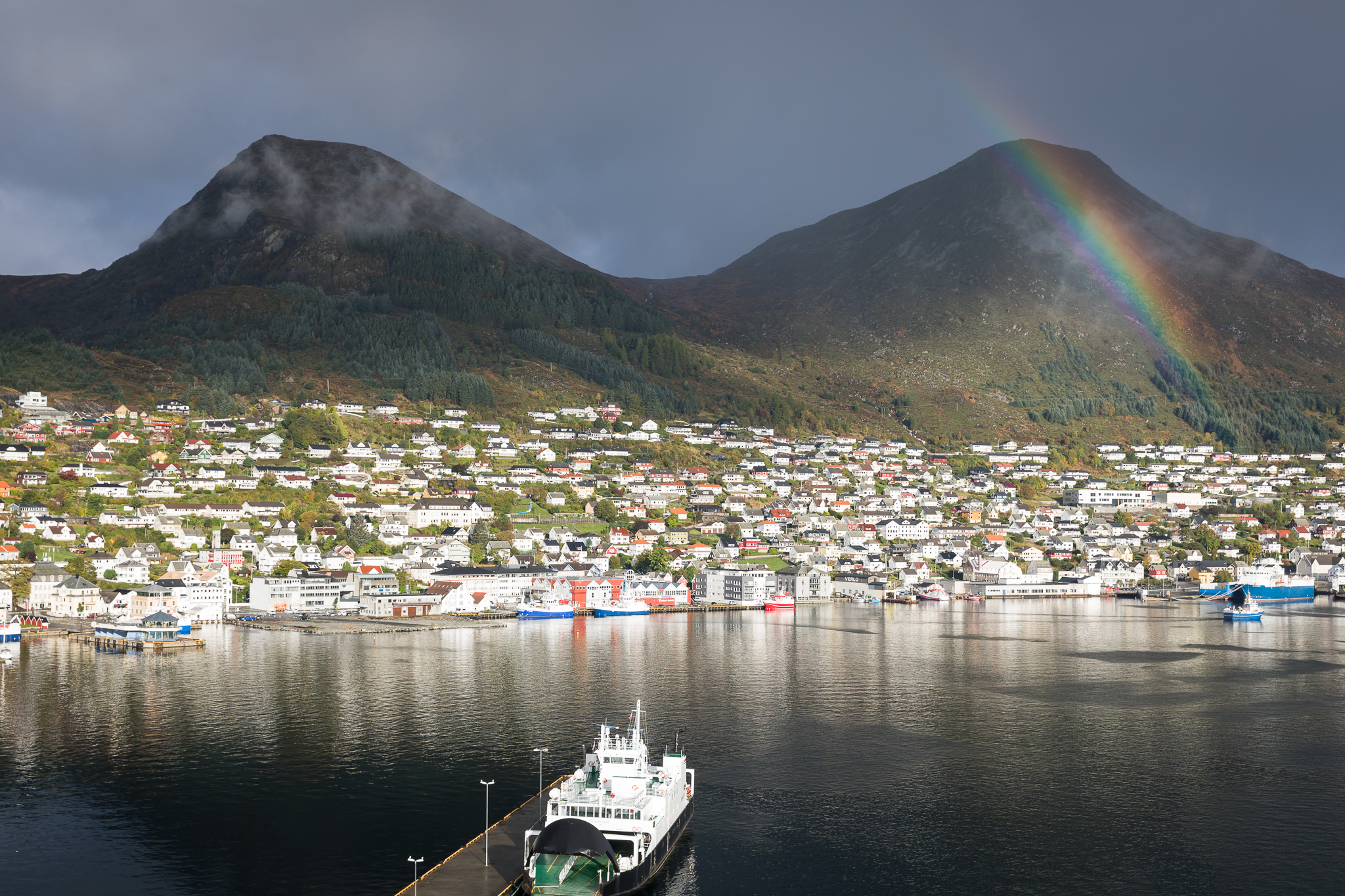
The town of Måløy

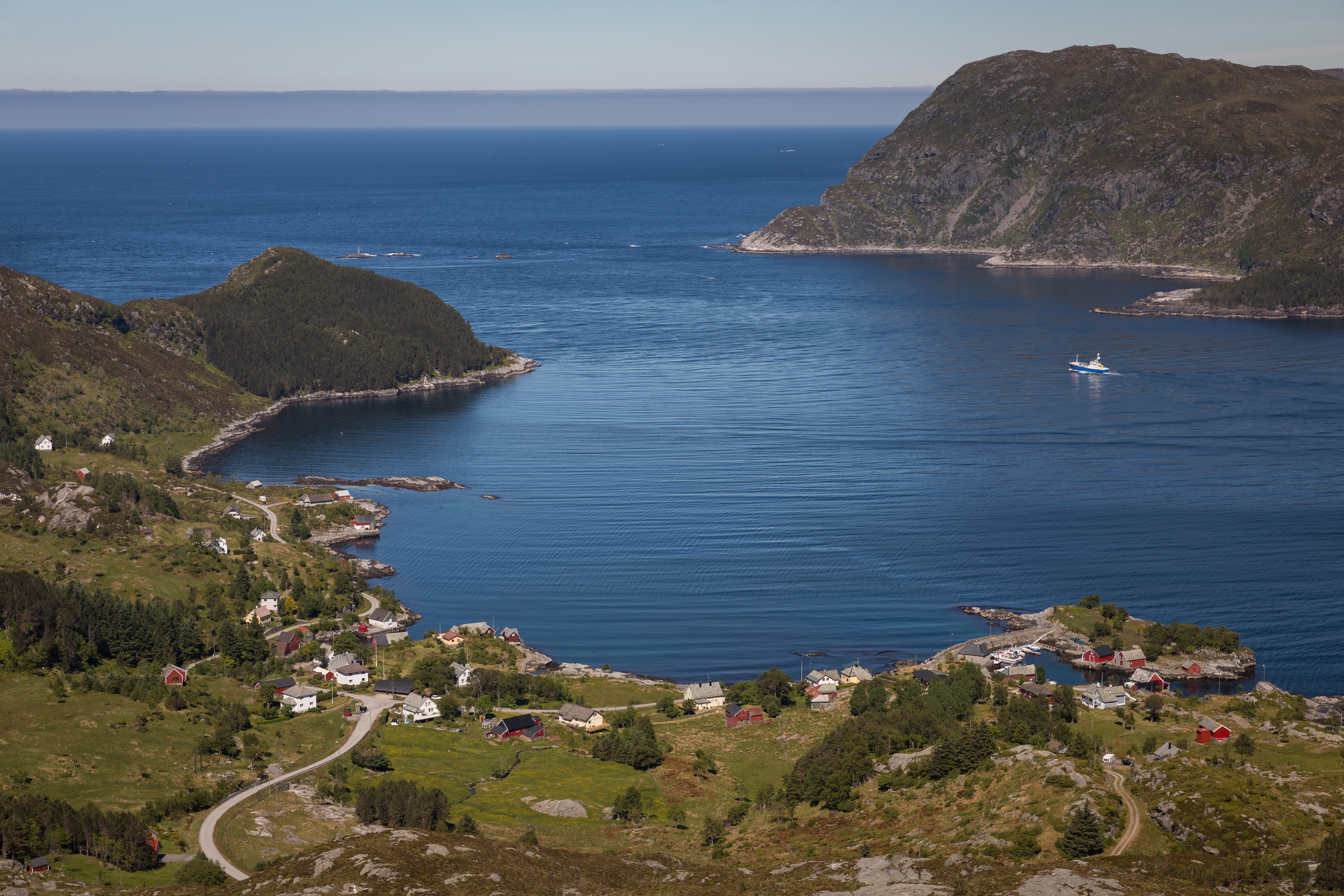
The village Husevåg on Husevågøy, sout of Vågsøy

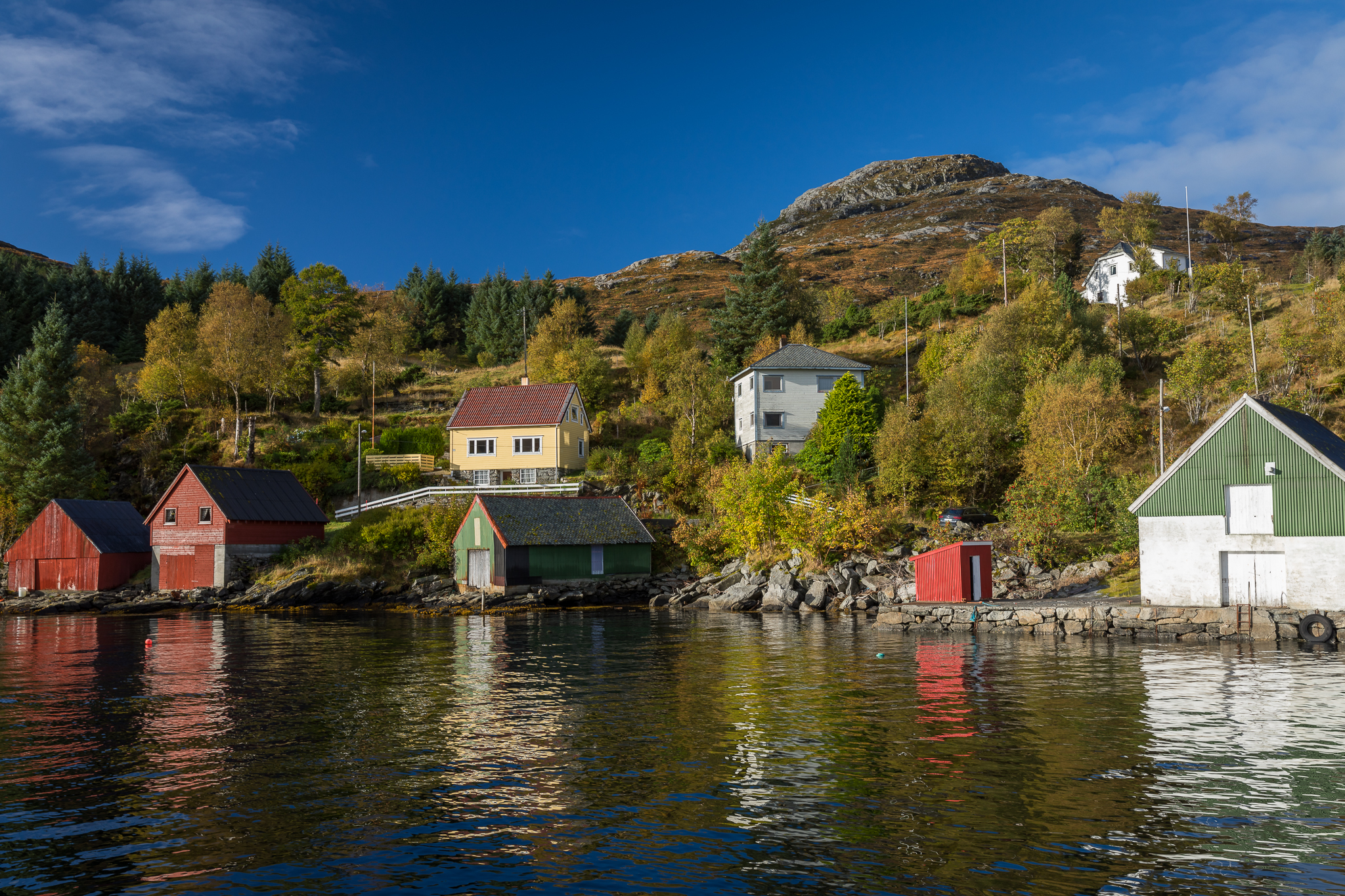
Houses in Husevåg at Husevågøy

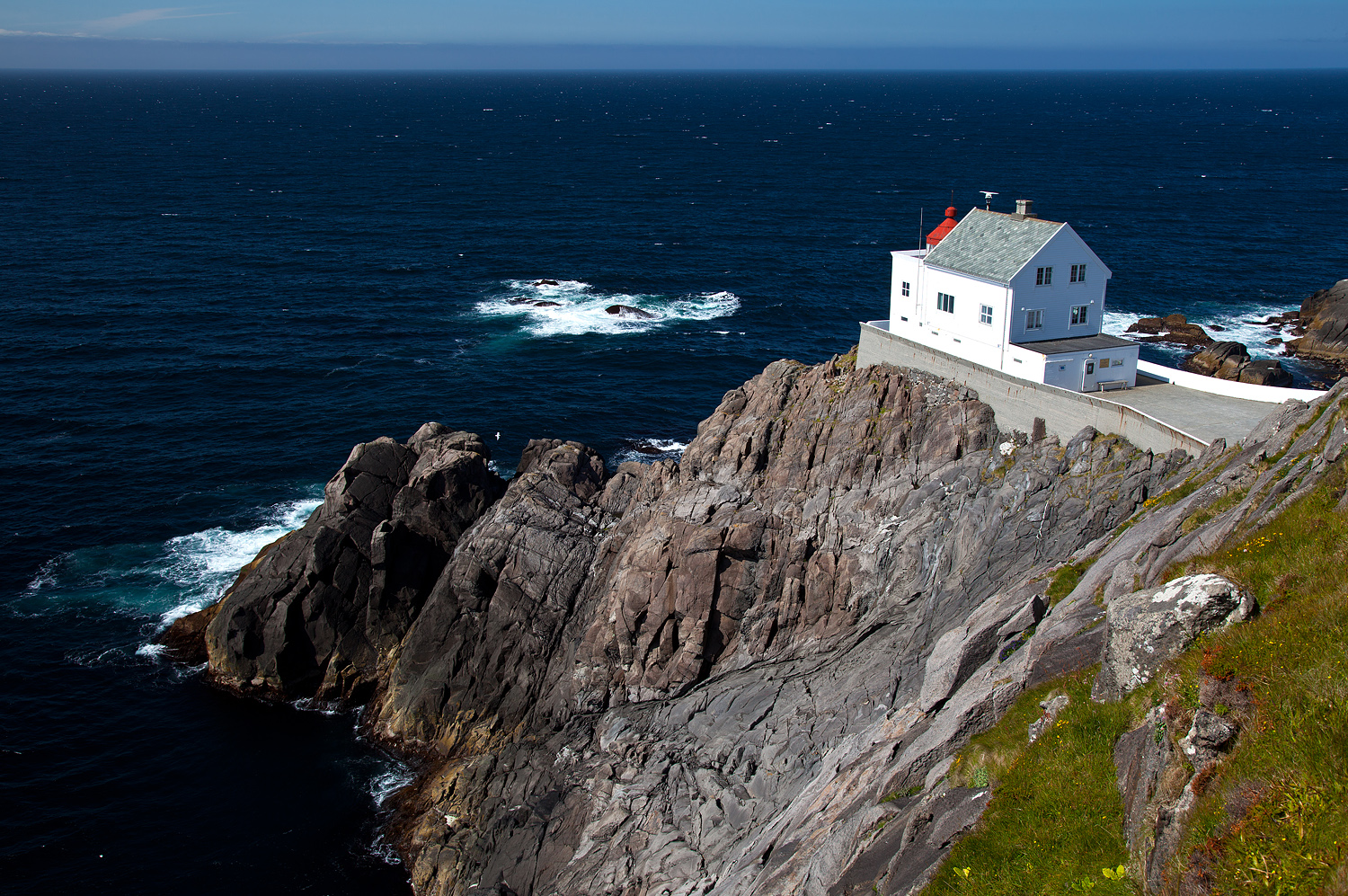
Kråkenes Lighthouse

== See also ==
- List of islands of Norway
- Operation Archery: British WWII commando raid against German positions on the island on 27 December 1941.
