= Refvika =

Village in Kinn Municipality, Norway

Refvika Refvik (unofficial)
- Village
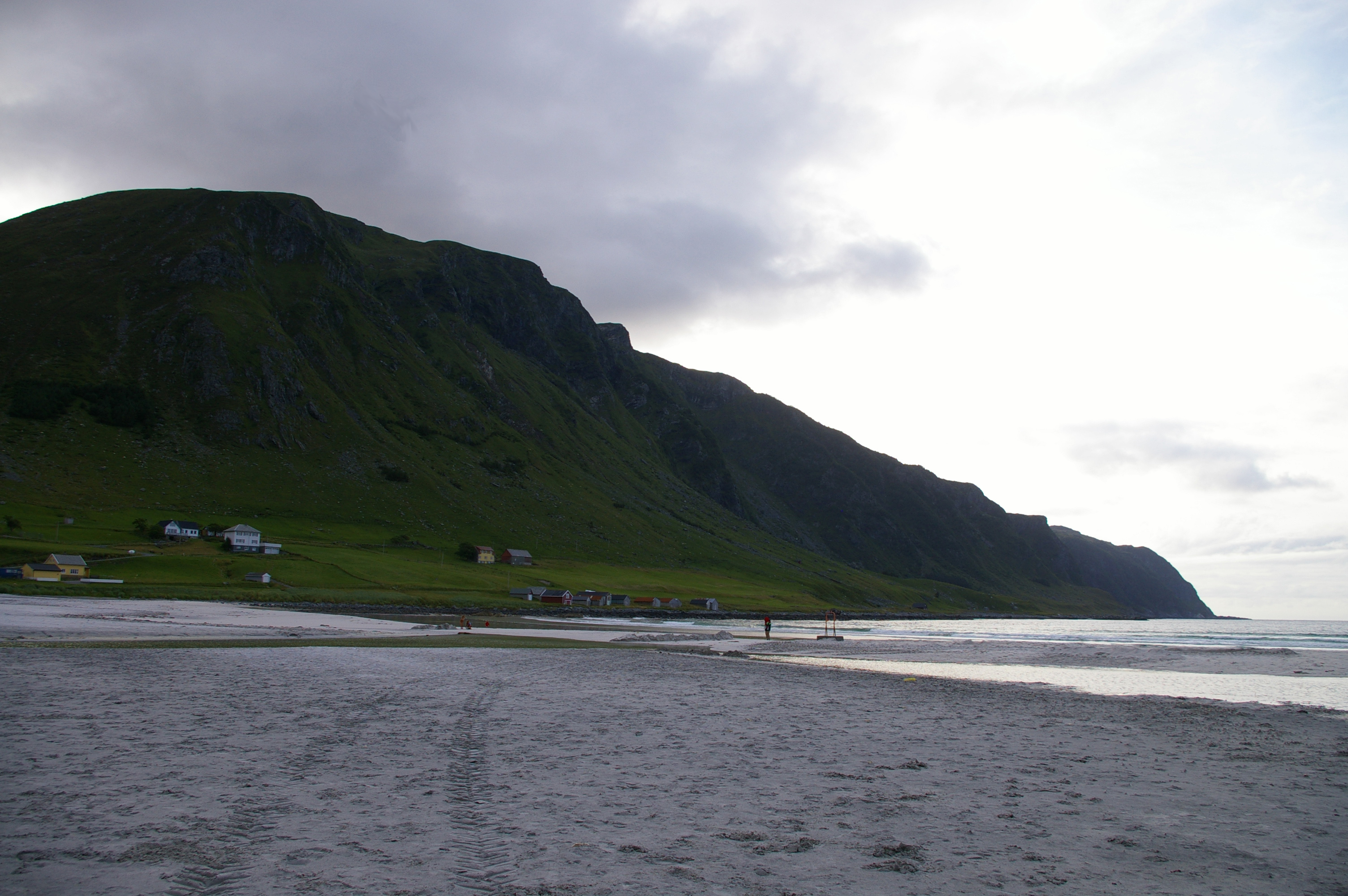
- Refvikstranden beach in Refvik
- Interactive map of Refvika
- Location within Vestland Location within Norway
- Coordinates: 61.9984°N 5.0899°E
- Country: Norway
- Region: Western Norway
- County: Vestland
- District: Nordfjord
- Municipality: Kinn Municipality
- Elevation: 5 m (16 ft)

Population (2001)
  - Total: 126
- Time zone: UTC+01:00 (CET)
  - Summer (DST): UTC+02:00 (CEST)
- Post Code: 6710 Raudeberg

Refvika is a village in Kinn Municipality in Vestland county, Norway. It is located on the north side of the island of Vågsøy, about 2 kilometres (1.2 mi) northwest of the village of Raudeberg, 2 kilometres (1.2 mi) south of Vedvika, and 3.5 kilometres (2.2 mi) southwest of Langenes. The village of Kvalheim is located 2 kilometres (1.2 mi) to the southwest on the other side of a mountain.

The village lies between the lake Refvikvatnet and the ocean. The local Refviksanden beach, with its beautiful silver sand, is a 0.6 kilometres (0.37 mi) long beach is a popular swimming beach that draws many tourists. Refvika has a population of about 110 people.

The Tornado Måløy FK association football team sometimes plays in Refvika.
