= Silda, Kinn =

Island in Vestland, Norway

Silda
- Interactive map of Silda

Geography
- Location: Vestland, Norway
- Coordinates: 62.0127°N 5.1891°E
- Area: 1.1 km^{2} (0.42 sq mi)
- Length: 1.5 km (0.93 mi)
- Width: 1 km (0.6 mi)
- Coastline: 7 km (4.3 mi)
- Highest elevation: 98 m (322 ft)
- Highest point: Vardehaugen

Administration
- Norway
- County: Vestland
- Municipality: Kinn Municipality

Demographics
- Population: 12 (2014)

Silda is an island in Kinn Municipality in Vestland county, Norway. The 1.1-square-kilometre (0.42 sq mi) island is located 2 kilometres (1.2 mi) northeast of the large island of Vågsøy in the Sildagapet bay and about 2.5 kilometres (1.6 mi) west of the island of Barmøya. Silda sits about 2 kilometres (1.2 mi) east of the small village of Langenes and about 3 kilometres (1.9 mi) northeast of the village of Raudeberg, both on the island of Vågsøy. This island is the site of the 1810 Battle of Silda. In 2014, there were 12 inhabitants on the island, which is only accessible by boat.

== Name ==
The name of the island comes from the Norwegian language word sild which means herring, since herring fishing has been important in the region for centuries.

== Media gallery ==
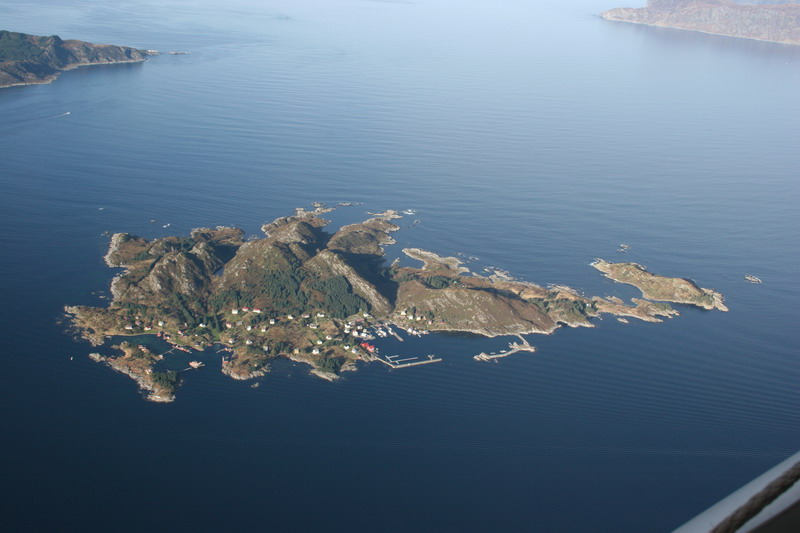
Island of Silda

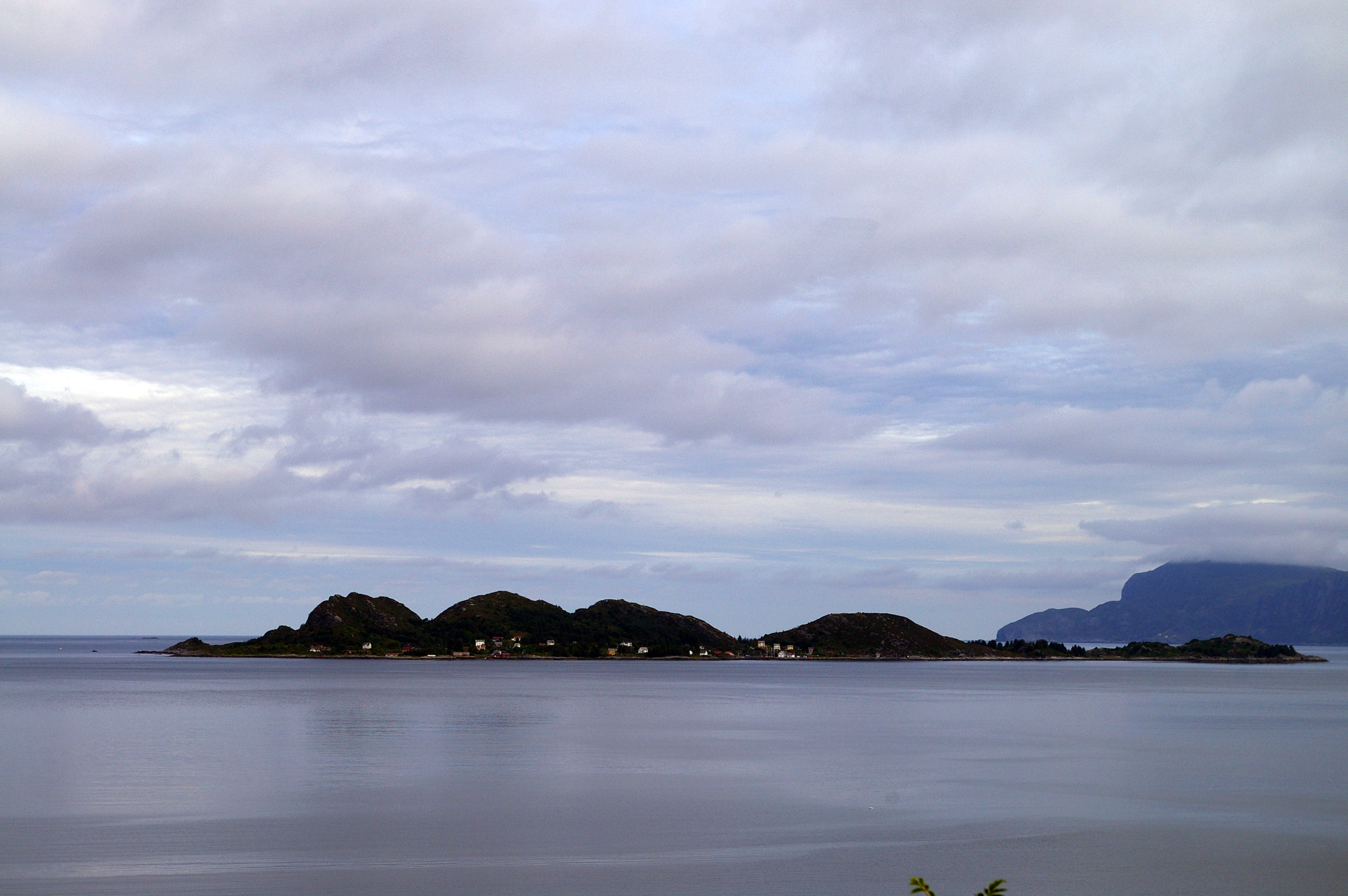
View of Silda

== See also ==
- List of islands of Norway
