= Norheimsund Church =

Church in Vestland, Norway

- Norheimsund kyrkje
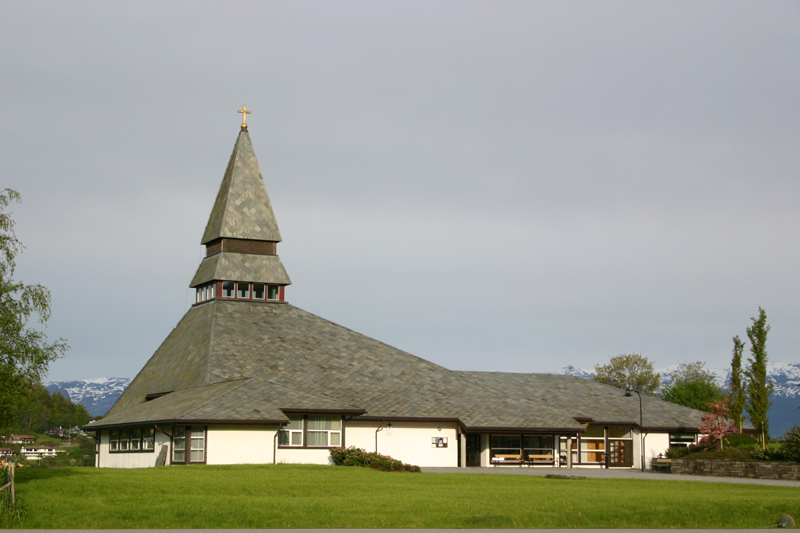
- View of the church
- Norheimsund Church
- 60°22′07″N 6°08′38″E
- Location: Kvam Municipality, Vestland
- Country: Norway
- Denomination: Church of Norway
- Churchmanship: Evangelical Lutheran

History
- Status: Parish church
- Founded: 1989
- Consecrated: 4 June 1989

Architecture
- Functional status: Active
- Architect: Peder A. Ristesund
- Architectural type: Long church
- Completed: 1989 (37 years ago)

Specifications
- Capacity: 700
- Materials: Stone/Brick

Administration
- Diocese: Bjørgvin bispedømme
- Deanery: Hardanger og Voss prosti
- Parish: Vikøy

Norheimsund Church (Norwegian: Norheimsund kyrkje) is a parish church of the Church of Norway in Kvam Municipality in Vestland county, Norway. It is located in the village of Norheimsund. It is one of the churches for the Vikøy parish which is part of the Hardanger og Voss prosti (deanery) in the Diocese of Bjørgvin. The brick church was built in a long church design in 1989 using plans drawn up by the architect Peder A. Ristesund from Bergen. The church seats about 700 people.

== History ==
Historically, the people of Norheimsund were part of the Vikøy Church parish, meaning the people of Norheimsund had to travel several kilometers to the church located in Vikøy. In 1985, a foundation was formed in Norheimsund with the sole purpose of trying to raise money and support for a church to be built in Norheimsund. In 1986, there was a groundbreaking ceremony and work began on the new church. It was designed by the Bergen architect Peder Ristesund. The church was consecrated on 4 June 1989 by the Bishop Per Lønning. In 1992, the church was enlarged.

== See also ==
- List of churches in Bjørgvin
