= Nesland Church =

Church in Telemark, Norway

- Nesland kyrkje
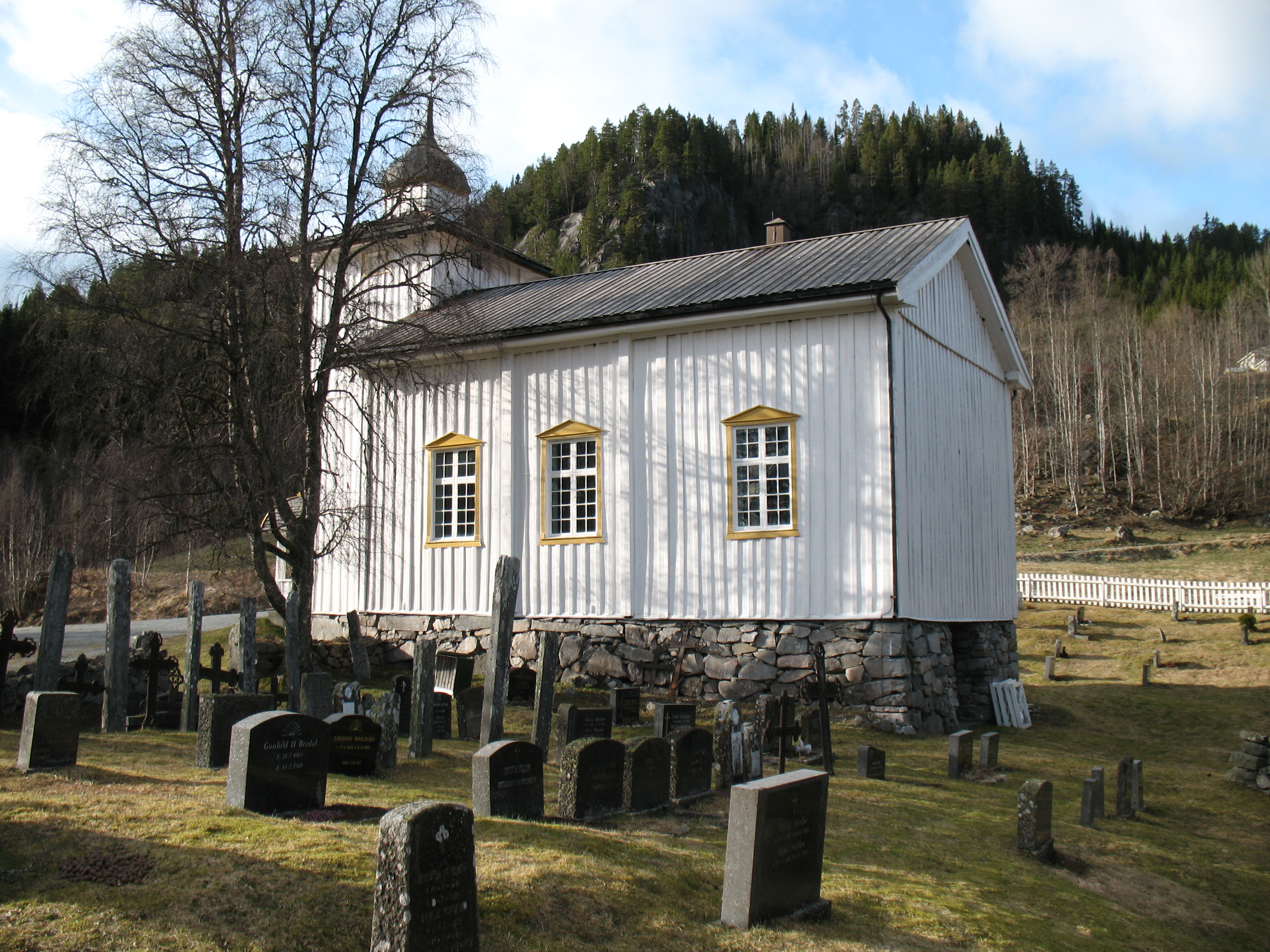
- View of the church
- Nesland Church
- 59°31′26″N 7°59′09″E
- Location: Vinje Municipality, Telemark
- Country: Norway
- Denomination: Church of Norway
- Previous denomination: Catholic Church
- Churchmanship: Evangelical Lutheran

History
- Status: Parish church
- Founded: 12th century

Architecture
- Functional status: Active
- Architect: Hans Linstow
- Architectural type: Long church
- Completed: 1847 (179 years ago)

Specifications
- Capacity: 110
- Materials: Wood

Administration
- Diocese: Agder og Telemark
- Deanery: Øvre Telemark prosti
- Parish: Vinje og Nesland
- Norwegian Cultural Heritage Site
- Type: Church
- Status: Automatically protected
- ID: 85121

Nesland Church (Norwegian: Nesland kyrkje) is a parish church of the Church of Norway in Vinje Municipality in Telemark county, Norway. Located in the village of Nesland, it is one of the churches for the Vinje og Nesland parish which is part of the Øvre Telemark prosti (deanery) in the Diocese of Agder og Telemark. The white, wooden church was built in a long church design in 1847 using plans drawn up by the architect Hans Linstow. The church seats about 110 people.

== History ==
The first church at Nesland was a small wooden stave church that was built during the 12th century. An inscription in the church states that on 8 August 1242 the church was consecrated, likely due to a renovation or change in the building (this was likely not the first time the church was consecrated), perhaps it was when the chancel was built since that part of the building was newer than the nave. The church measured about 8 to 9 metres (26 to 30 ft) long, making it a very small church. The choir was unusually high, raised several steps above the floor of the nave.

Eventually, after several centuries in use, the church was deemed to be too small for the parish. Plans from Hans Linstow were used to build a new church on a site about 20 metres (66 ft) to the north of the old church. The new church was a simple, small, wooden long church with the choir in the same room as the nave. The church has a west tower with a church porch at the foot of the tower.

Magnus Brostrup Landstad tried to preserve the old church building, but he was overruled and the old church was torn down after the new church was consecrated; the local parish farmers did not want to spend money keeping up the old building in addition to the new one. Landstad wrote about the church saying: "[it made] a strange impression. The sparse lighting, the narrow room, the choir's unusual height above the nave, the unusual paint applied to the walls and ceiling, and above all the impression that one was in the same, probably very little changed, surroundings, among which the fathers of 600 years ago sat in devotional assembly, and where, according to all reasonableness, the first Christian born in this place had worshipfully bowed his knees to the Lord."

== See also ==
- List of churches in Agder og Telemark
