= Nils Nilsson Skaar =

Norwegian politician

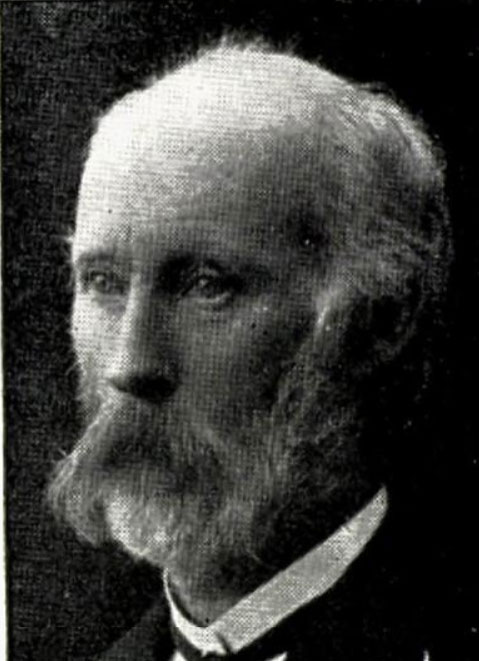
Portrait of Nils Nilsson Skaar

Nils Nilsson Skaar (March 28, 1852 – June 12, 1948) was a Norwegian teacher, farmer, editor, and parliamentary representative from Fyksesund in Kvam Municipality in Hordaland county.

== Family ==
Skaar was born at the Botnen farm at the head of the Fyksesund in Vikør Municipality (now called Kvam Municipality), the son of Nils Nilsson Skaar (1826–1909), also a mayor and parliamentary representative, and Blansa Nilsdotter Rykkje (1826–1908). His uncle Johannes Skaar (1828–1904) was a Norwegian bishop and hymnologist.

== Career ==
Skaar served as mayor for 20 years and had a permanent seat in the Storting for a total of 15 years (for Søndre Bergenhus from 1886 to 1894, and for Hardanger from 1910 to 1915), and he also participated in another two sessions. He was a member of the Liberal Party. In the Storting he served on the budget and constitution committees, among other positions. He also operated the newspaper Hordaland Folkeblad. Skaar was a county auditor from 1898 to 1910, and he attended the coronation of King Haakon VII and his wife Queen Maud in Trondheim in 1906.
