= Holmavatnet =

Holmavatnet may refer to many lakes in Norway:

- Holmavatnet (Eigersund), a lake in the municipality of Eigersund in Rogaland county
- Holmavatnet (Kvam), a lake in the municipality of Kvam in Vestland county
- Holmavatnet (Samnanger), a lake in the municipality of Samnanger in Vestland county
- Holmavatnet (Skjold), a lake in the municipality of Vindafjord in Rogaland county
- Holmavatnet (Ullensvang), a lake in the municipality of Ullensvang in Vestland county
- Holmavatnet (Vaksdal), a lake in the municipality of Vaksdal in Vestland county
- Holmavatnet (Vinje), a lake on the borders of Telemark, Rogaland, and Agder counties

== See also ==
- Holmevatnet
