= Holmavatnet (Kvam) =

Lake in Kvam, Hordaland, Norway

- Holmevatnet
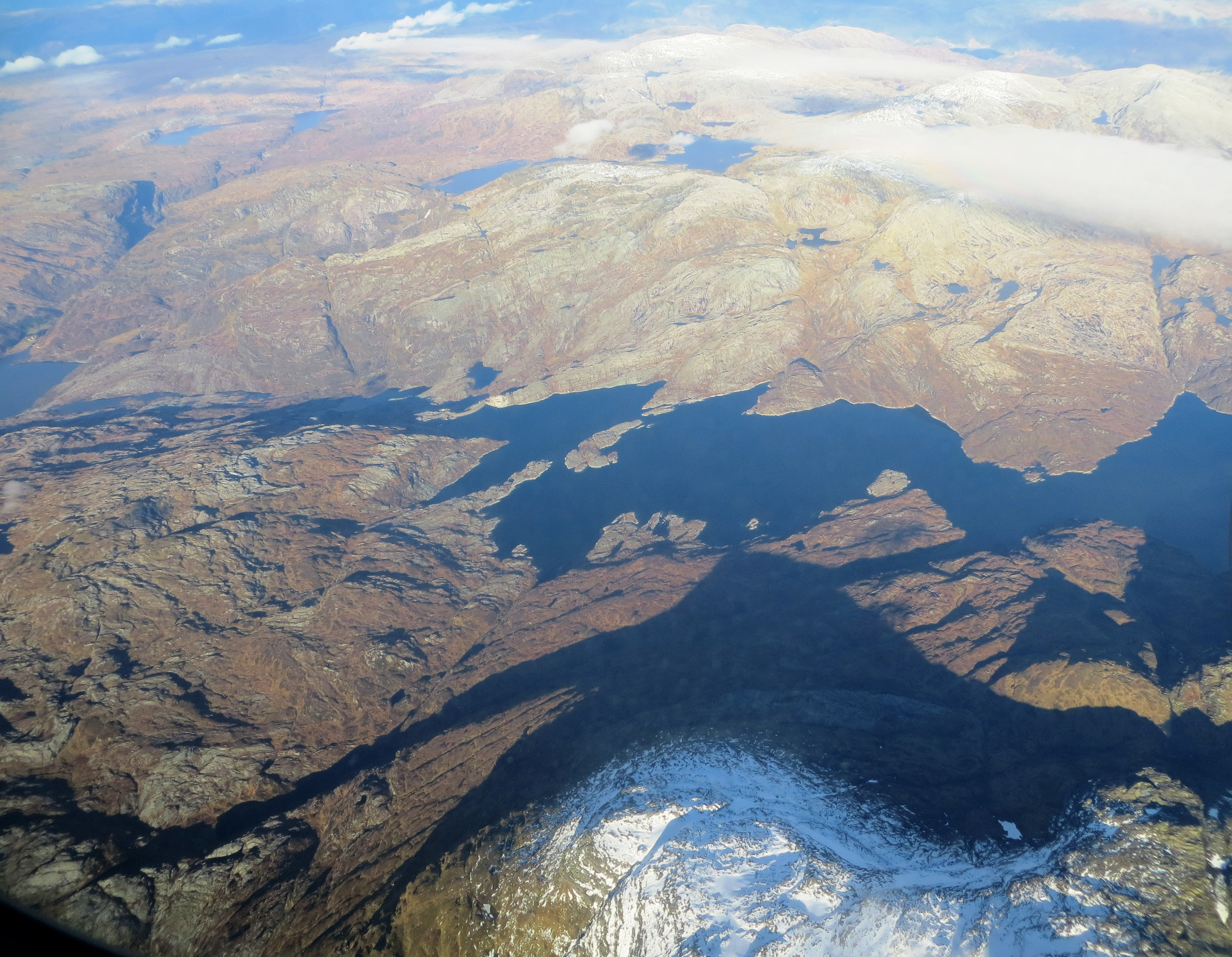
- Aerial view of the lake
- Interactive map of Holmavatnet
- Location: Kvam Municipality, Vestland
- Coordinates: 60.45558°N 5.98421°E
- Basin countries: Norway
- Surface area: 2.92 km^{2} (1.13 sq mi)
- Shore length^{1}: 13.96 kilometres (8.67 mi)
- Surface elevation: 626 metres (2,054 ft)
- References: NVE
- ^{1} Shore length is not a well-defined measure.

Holmavatnet is a lake in Kvam Municipality in Vestland county, Norway. It is located on the north side of Kvamskogen, about 12 kilometres (7.5 mi) northwest of the municipal centre of Norheimsund. The western end of the lake is dammed for purposes of hydroelectric power generation.

== See also ==
- List of lakes in Norway
