= Steine, Vestland =

Village in Kvam Municipality, Norway

Steine
- Village
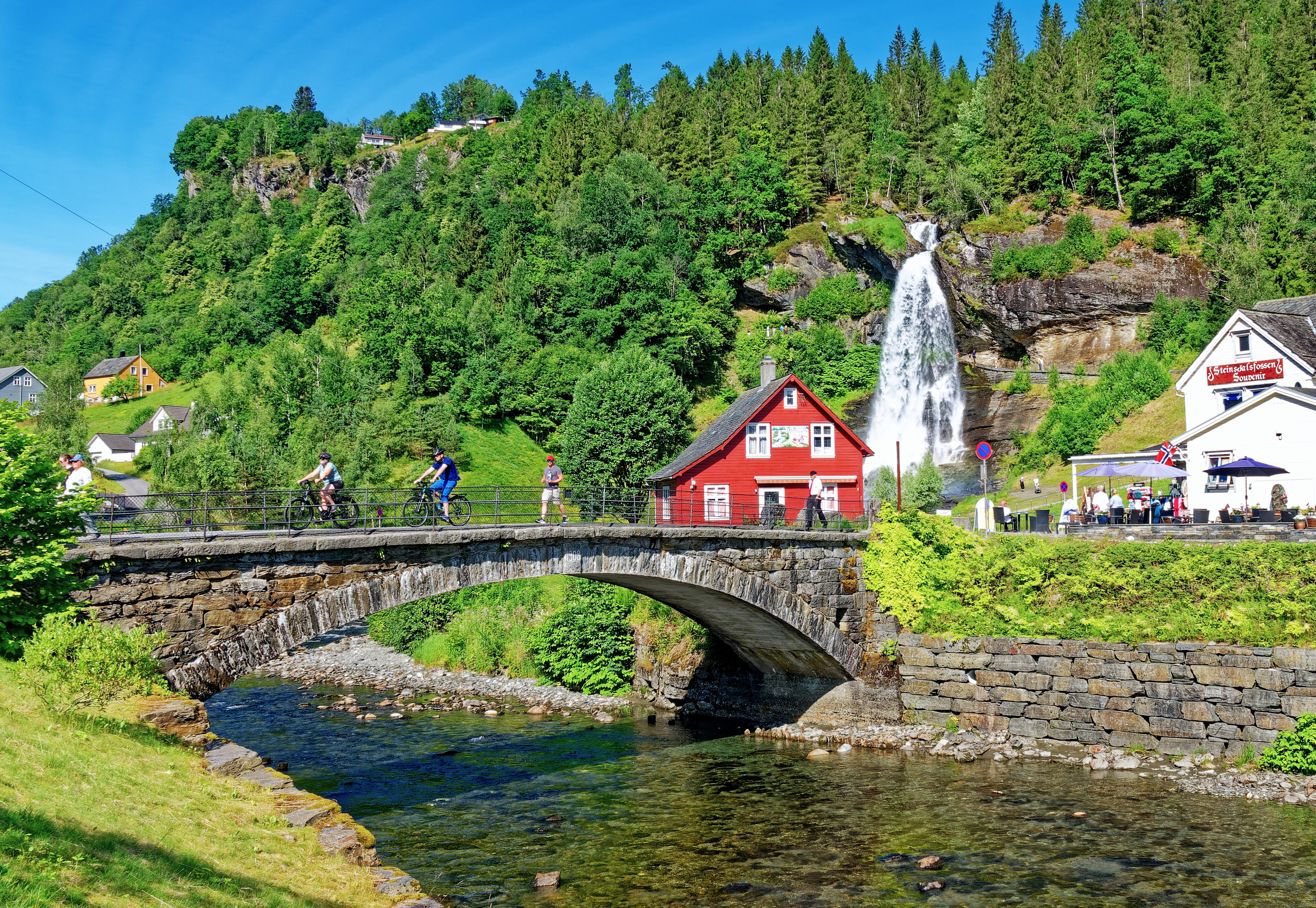
- View of the village waterfall
- Interactive map of Steine
- Coordinates: 60.3625°N 6.08276°E
- Country: Norway
- Region: Western Norway
- County: Vestland
- District: Hardanger
- Municipality: Kvam Municipality
- Elevation: 10 m (33 ft)
- Time zone: UTC+01:00 (CET)
  - Summer (DST): UTC+02:00 (CEST)
- Post Code: 5600 Norheimsund

Steine is a village in Kvam Municipality in Vestland county, Norway. It is located in the Steinsdalen valley which runs from the Kvamskogen area to the outskirts of the large village of Norheimsund. Norwegian County Road 7 runs through Steine. The Steinsdalsfossen waterfall is a notable tourist attraction on the eastern edge of the village.
