= Bjølsegrøvvatnet =

Lake in Norway

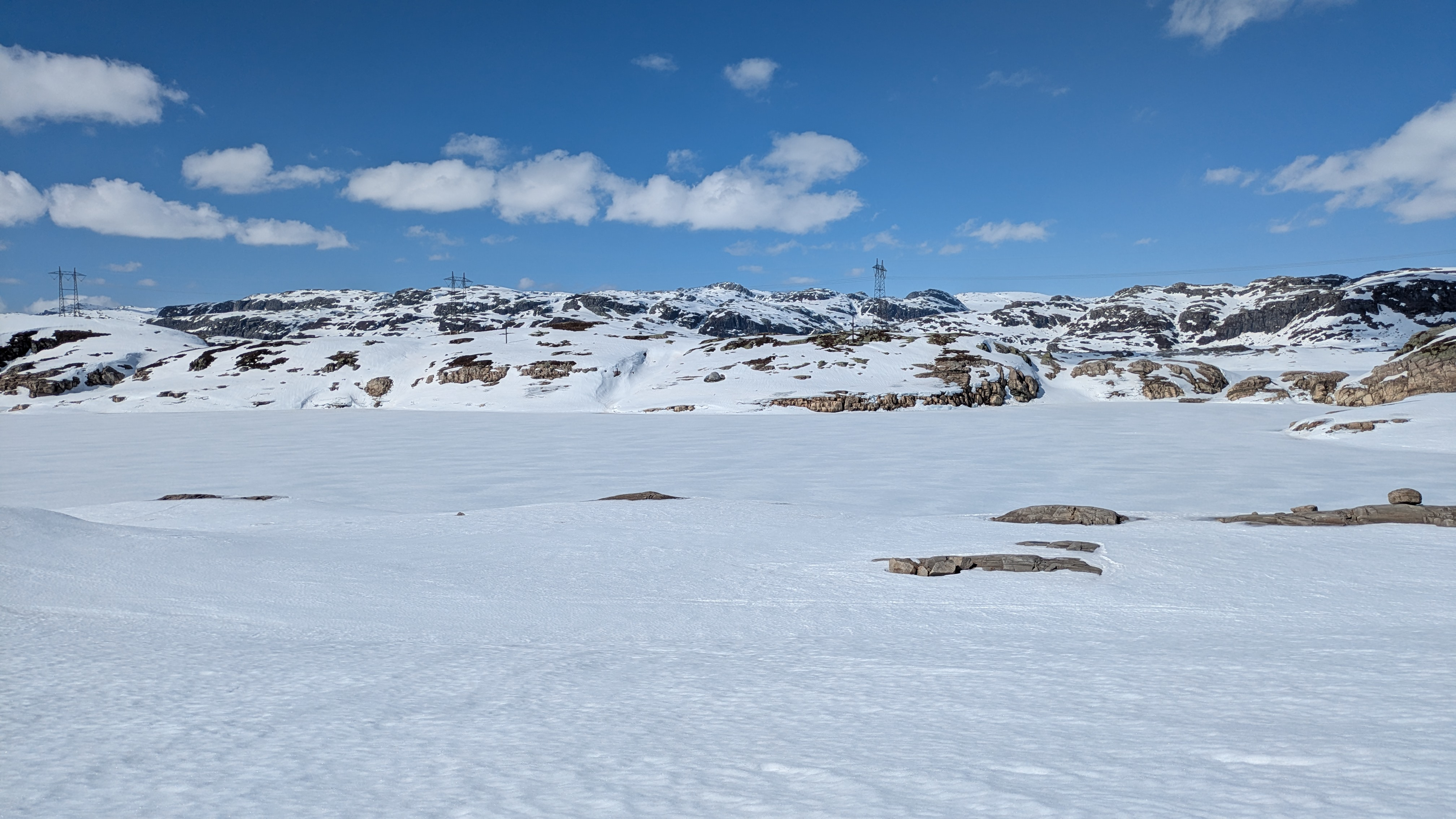
- Interactive map of Bjølsegrøvvatnet
- Location: Kvam Municipality, Vestland
- Coordinates: 60.45564°N 6.35867°E
- Basin countries: Norway
- Max. length: 2.5 kilometres (1.6 mi)
- Max. width: 4 kilometres (2.5 mi)
- Surface area: 5.82 km^{2} (2.25 sq mi)
- Shore length^{1}: 19.98 kilometres (12.41 mi)
- Surface elevation: 880 metres (2,890 ft)
- References: NVE
- ^{1} Shore length is not a well-defined measure.

Bjølsegrøvvatnet is a lake in Kvam Municipality in Vestland county, Norway. The 5.82-square-kilometre (2.25 sq mi) lake lies at an elevation of 880 metres (2,890 ft) above sea level in the mountains east of the Fyksesund fjord and northwest of the village of Ålvik. It has a dam on the southeastern tip of the lake to regulate the amount of water in it. The lake is used as a reservoir for the nearby Bjølvo hydroelectric power station.

== See also ==
- List of lakes in Norway
