= Fyksesund Landscape Park =

Landscape park in Vestland, Norway

Fyksesund Landscape Park is a landscape park in Kvam Municipality in Vestland county, Norway. It is located around the Fyksesund fjord, an arm of the Hardangerfjord. Fyksesund Landscape Park is coordinated by the organisation: Landskapspark Hordaland. It is one of three landscape parks in the Hardanger region, the other two being Herand Landscape Park, located on the southern side of the Hardangerfjord in Ullensvang Municipality (directly across from Fyksesund) and Vikebygdkrinsen Landscape Park in Vikebygd, north of the town of Odda (also in Ullensvang Municipality).

The term "landscape park" is defined by Landskapspark Hordaland, which was founded and is funded by the county government of Vestland, as "unique natural and cultural landscapes, delimited by common culture and identity". According to the organisation, "local communities and businesses are developed together in order to make the areas attractive as places of residence and for visiting".

Fyksesund Landscape Park encompasses several small communities, including Steinstø, Fykse, Klyve, Porsmyr, Rykkje, Flotve and Soldal, with a total population of approximately 400 people. The communities around the inner part of the fjord do not have road connections, and can only be reached by boat or foot. One of the mostly abandoned roadless villages is Botnen, through which a bicycle path runs, known for manufacturing of Hardanger fiddles in past times.
