= Tørvikbygd =

Village in Kvam Municipality, Norway

- Village
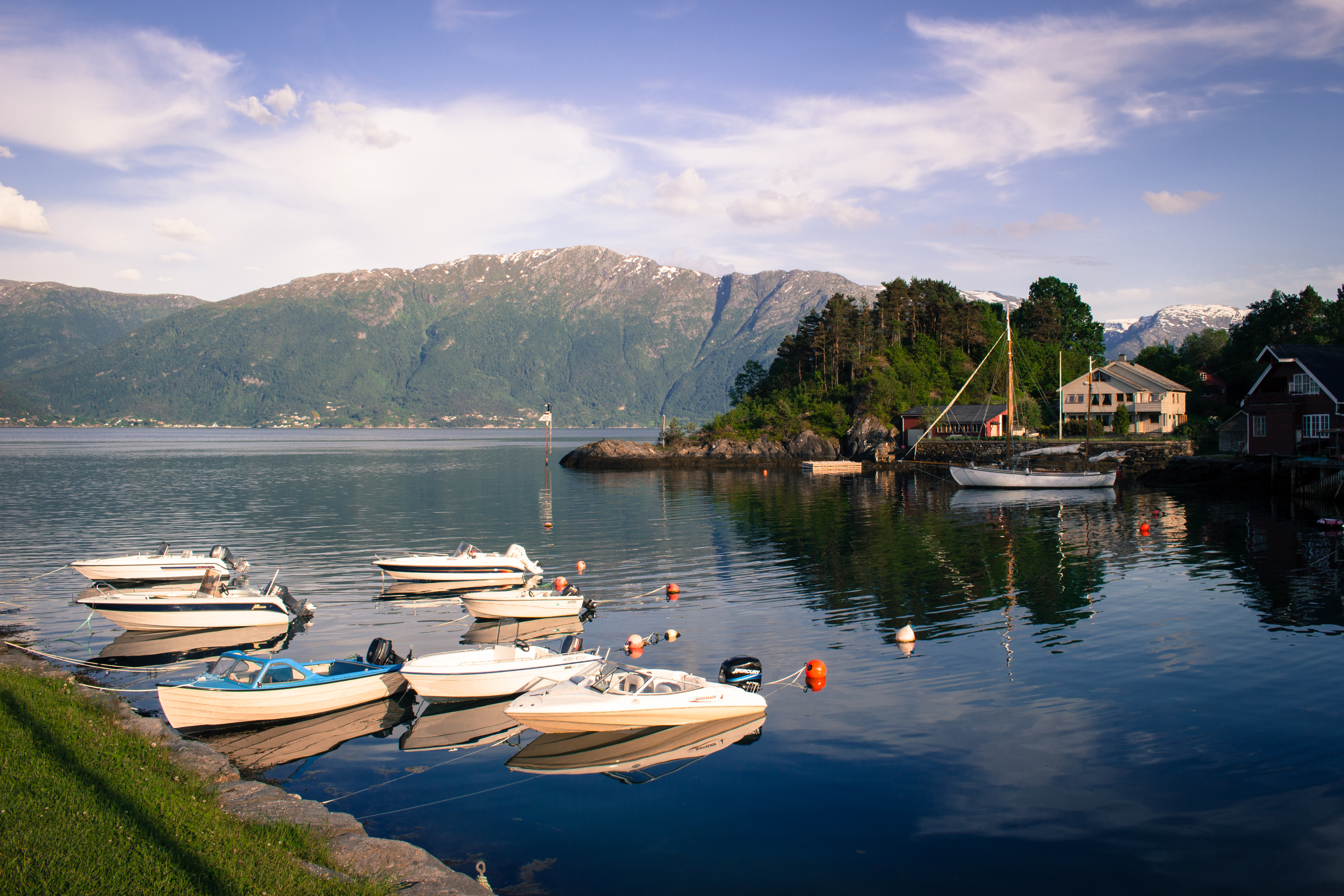
- View of the village
- Interactive map of Tørvikbygd
- Coordinates: 60.30158°N 6.16909°E
- Country: Norway
- Region: Western Norway
- County: Vestland
- District: Hardanger
- Municipality: Kvam Municipality
- Elevation: 12 m (39 ft)
- Time zone: UTC+01:00 (CET)
  - Summer (DST): UTC+02:00 (CEST)
- Post Code: 5620 Tørvikbygd

Tørvikbygd is a village in Kvam Municipality in Vestland county, Norway. The village is located on the west side of Hardanger Fjord, around 13 kilometres (8.1 mi) south of the village of Norheimsund, the administrative centre of the municipality.

The village is located along Norwegian County Road 49 (Fv49) which has a ferry crossing to connect to the village of Jondal in Ullensvang Municipality on the east side of the fjord. Tørvikbygd has primary school and post office. It is also the site of the Tørvikbygd Bygdemuseum.

== History ==
Tørvikbygd was part of Strandebarm Municipality until 1863 when it became part of the new Jondal Municipality. In 1965, the Tørvikbygd area was transferred to Kvam Municipality.

=== Name ===
The village name comes from a local farm name Tørvik (Old Norse: "Tørvikja" or "Tørvikjo". The prefix "Tør-" comes from "tyri" (which means pitch pine), from old Norwegian "turvi", which meant fat Pine wood.
