= Vikøy =

Village in Kvam Municipality, Norway

- Village
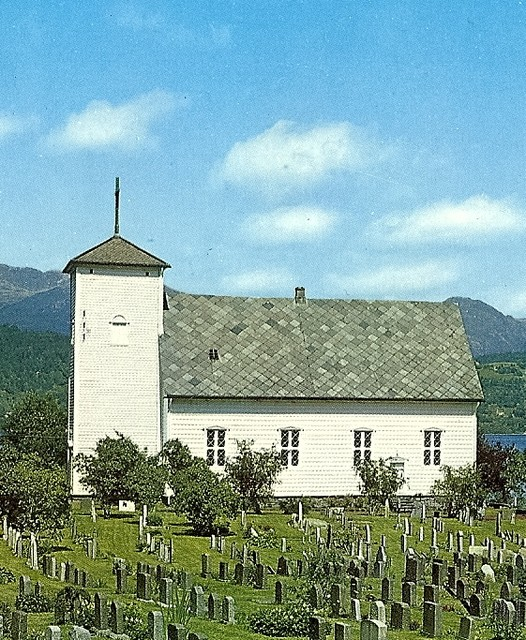
- View of the village church
- Interactive map of Vikøy
- Coordinates: 60.34983°N 6.17258°E
- Country: Norway
- Region: Western Norway
- County: Vestland
- District: Hardanger
- Municipality: Kvam Municipality

Area
  - Total: 0.51 km^{2} (0.20 sq mi)
- Elevation: 20 m (66 ft)

Population (2025)
  - Total: 396
  - Density: 776/km^{2} (2,010/sq mi)
- Time zone: UTC+01:00 (CET)
  - Summer (DST): UTC+02:00 (CEST)
- Post Code: 5600 Norheimsund

Vikøy is a village in Kvam Municipality in Vestland county, Norway. The village is located on the shore of the Hardangerfjorden, about 3 kilometres (1.9 mi) south of the municipal centre of Norheimsund and about 8 kilometres (5.0 mi) north of the village of Tørvikbygd. The 0.51-square-kilometre (130-acre) village has a population (2025) of 396 and a population density of 776 inhabitants per square kilometre (2,010/sq mi).

The village is the site of the Vikøy Church. It is also where the old Vikøy stave church stood for several centuries until 1863 when it was torn down. The historic name of Kvam Municipality was Vikør Municipality and it was named after this village since it was the site of the local church. The spelling was later changed to Vikøy. The old vicarage at Vikøy is now a museum. One of the buildings is called "Borgstova". The museum is open on Wednesdays in the summer. You can often find characters dressed in period clothing cooking krotekaker on those days.
