= Hans Linstow =

Danish/Norwegian architect

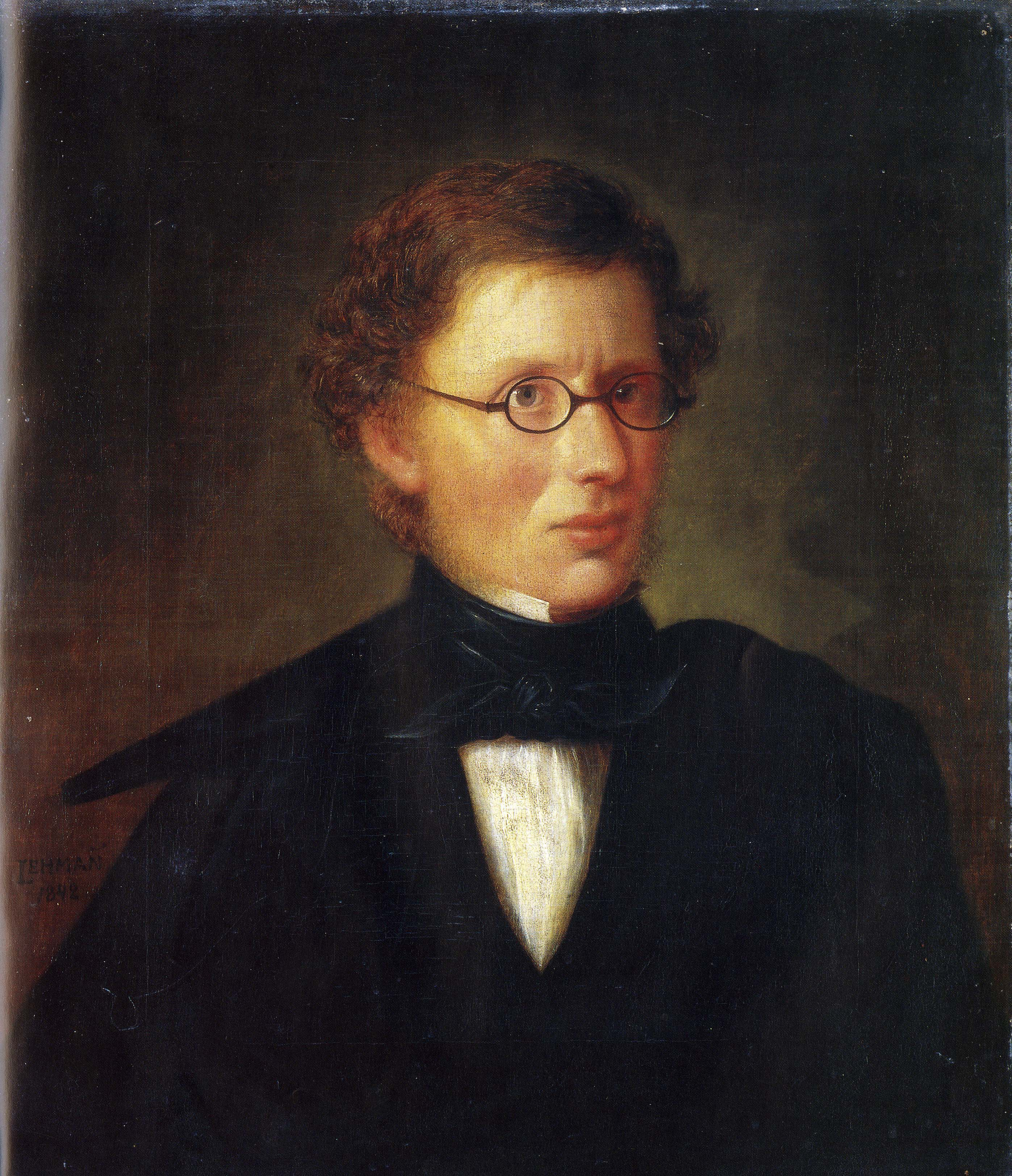
Portrait of Linstow by Carl Peter Lehmann, 1842

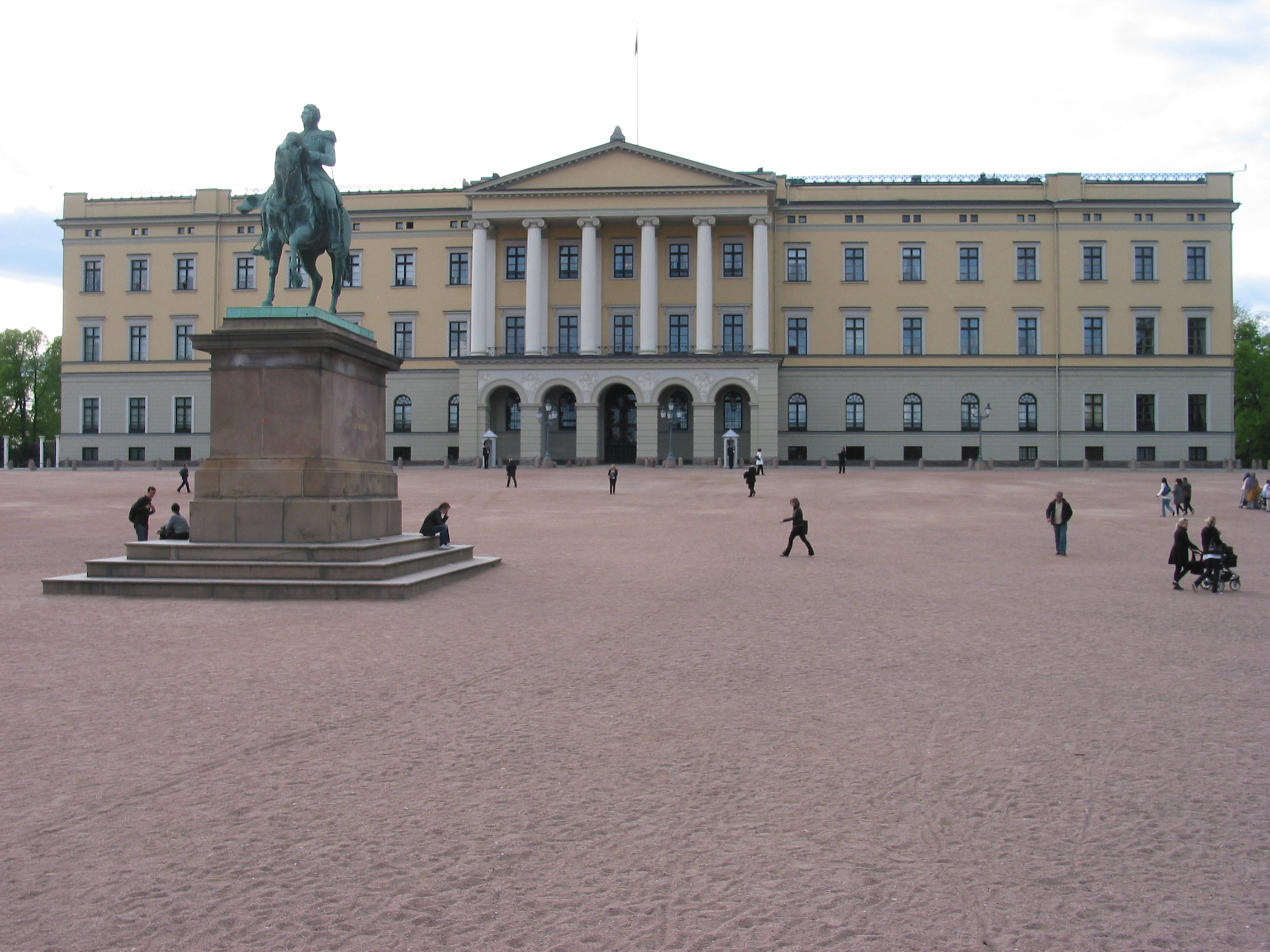
Norwegian Royal Palace (front)

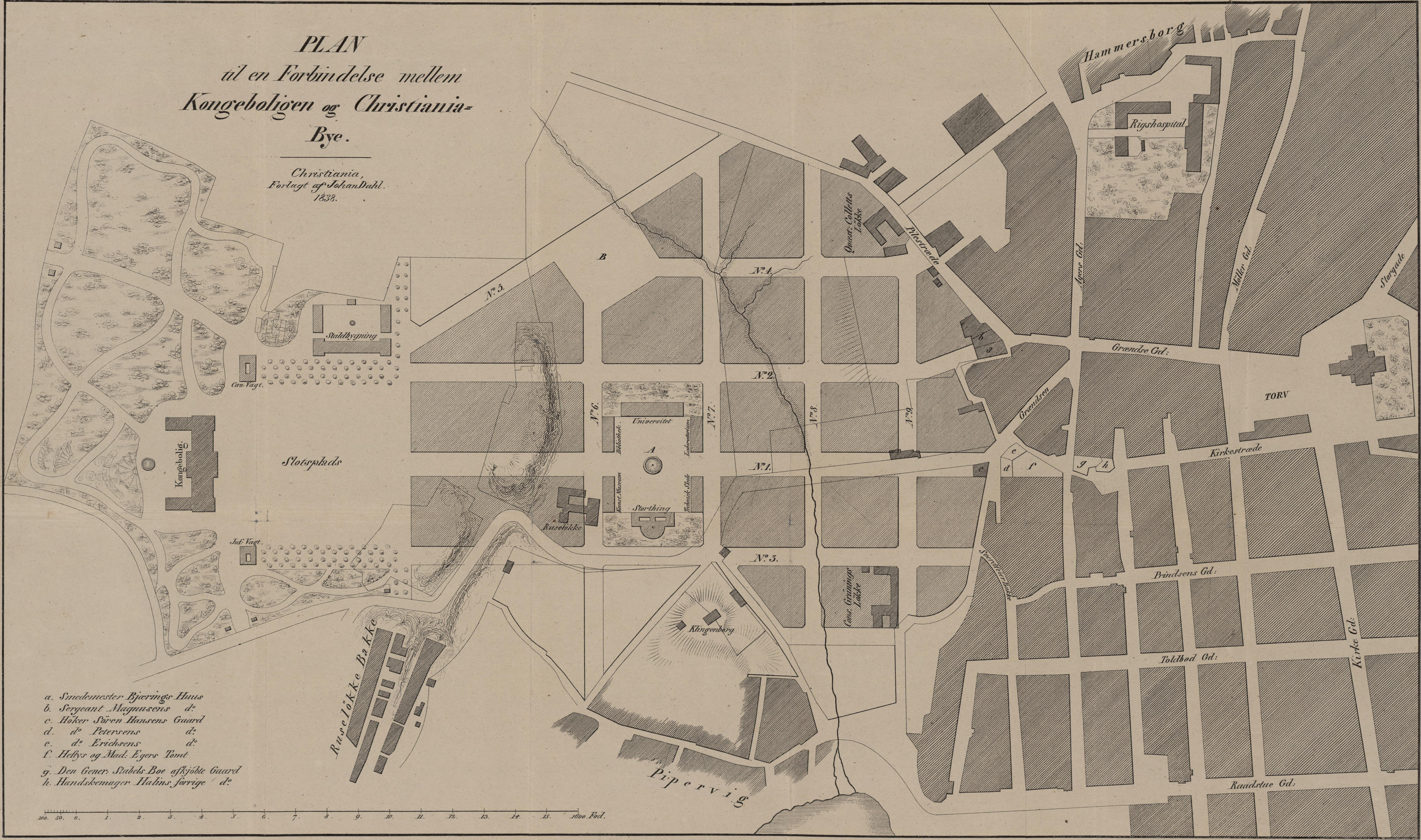
Linstow's 1838 plan to connect the Royal Palace and Christiania, with a monumental square to be surrounded by the University, Parliament and other public buildings

Hans Ditlev Franciscus (Frants) von Linstow (4 May 1787 – 10 June 1851) was a Danish/Norwegian architect who designed the Royal Palace in Oslo and much of the surrounding park and the street Karl Johans gate.

== Background ==
Hans Ditlev Franciscus von Linstow was born in Hørsholm, Denmark. His parents were Hartvig Christoph von Linstow (1740–1823) and Charlotta Benedicta Eleonora von der Lühe (1753–1837). Linstow belonged to a noble family from Mecklenburg who were naturalized in Denmark. He grew up in Hirschholm Castle (Hirschholm Slot) in Hørsholm. He matriculated in 1805 and earned a law degree at Copenhagen University in 1812. He first studied painting and drawings at the Art Academy in Copenhagen, Denmark, while he at the same time studied law.

== Career ==
After finalizing these studies in 1812, he went to Kongsberg, Norway (which then was united with Denmark) and studied in 1812–1814 at the so-called Bergakademiet, which educated military engineers. He did not, however, complete this military education, but studied architecture at the same time. He worked at the Danish Royal Court in 1814, but at the dissolution of the union between Denmark and Norway the same year, he went to Norway and worked in 1815–1820 as a military lawyer at the cavalry. In 1818, he was one of the initiators of the Norwegian National Academy of Craft and Art Industry in Christiania. He taught, first plaster, and later building construction until he took his leave in 1840.

In 1823, he was commissioned to design the new Royal Palace (Det Kongelige Slott) in Christiania and create the surrounding park, where he also drew the guards' house. He also helped his friend, the writer Henrik Wergeland in constructing his new house Grotten in the outskirts of the park. Both these buildings are examples of his early use of the Swiss chalet style in his drawings.

Since the Royal Palace was erected outside the main city area, Linstow proposed a plan in 1838 to connect the palace to the city. The main parts of this plan were realized in what is now the main boulevard and tourist area, the Karl Johans gate. In 1828–1835, Linstow worked on a set of standard drawings for Norwegian churches. About seventy different churches were erected all over Norway based on these drawings.

== Legacy ==
In 1885, a street Linstows gate in Christiania was named for him.

== Selected works ==
- Grue Church in Solør, 1823–28
- Royal Palace in Oslo, 1823–48
- Atrå Church in Tinn, 1828–36
- Flekkefjord Church in Agder, 1831–33
- Kvinesdal Church in Agder, 1835–37
- Vikøy Church in Kvam in Hardanger, 1838
- Lyngdal Rectory in Lyngdal in Agder, 1838
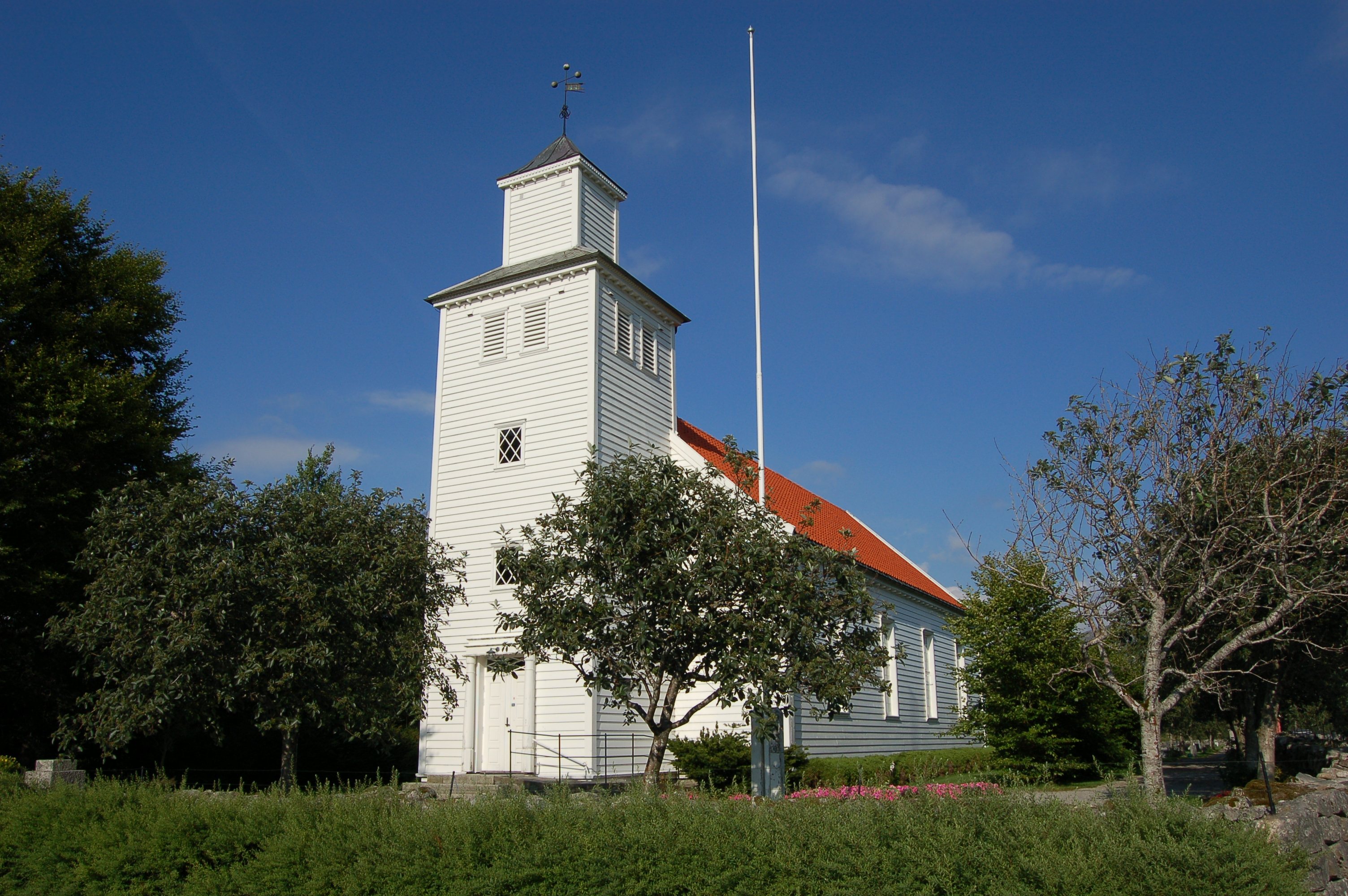
Gjesdal Church

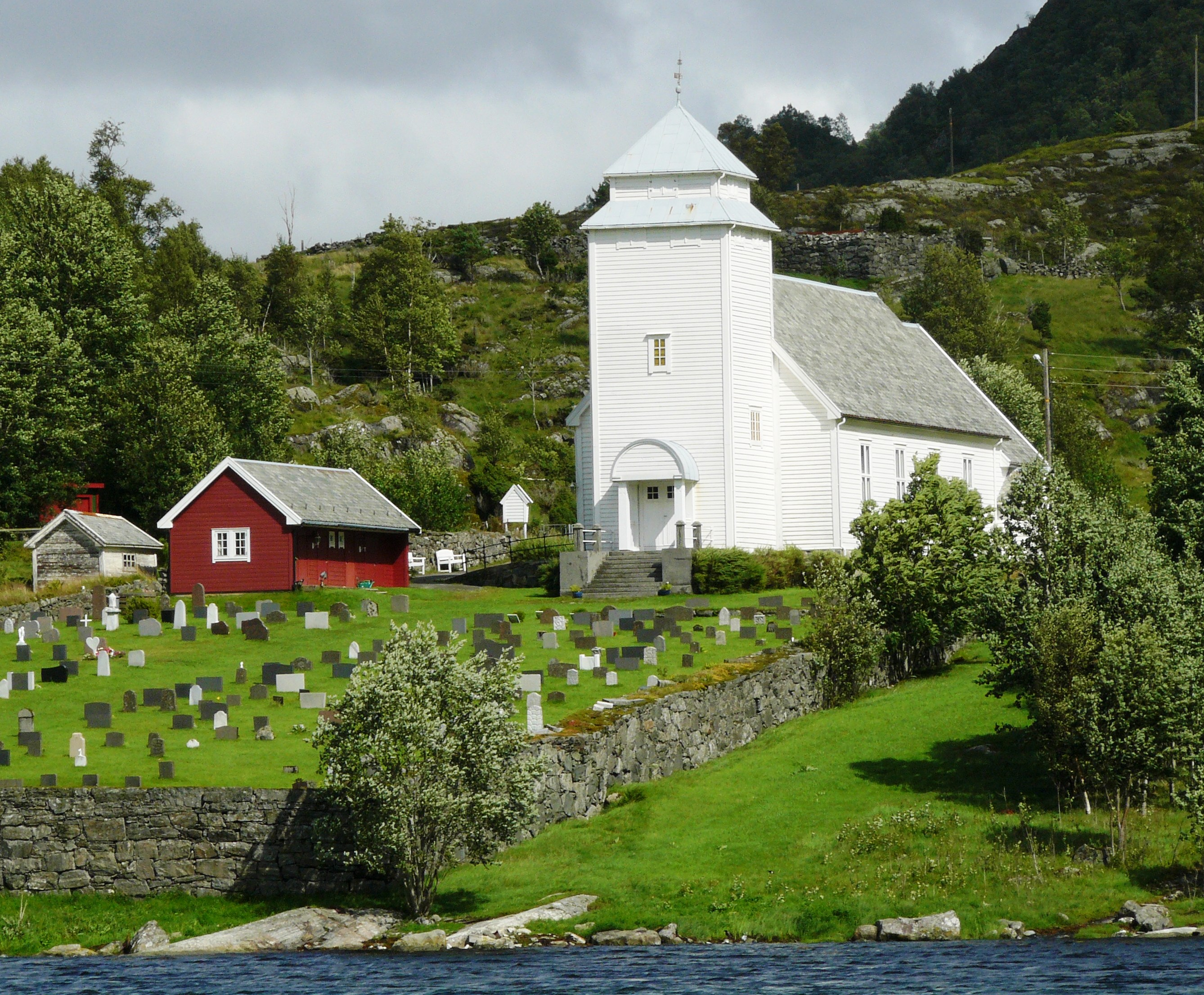
Rugsund Church

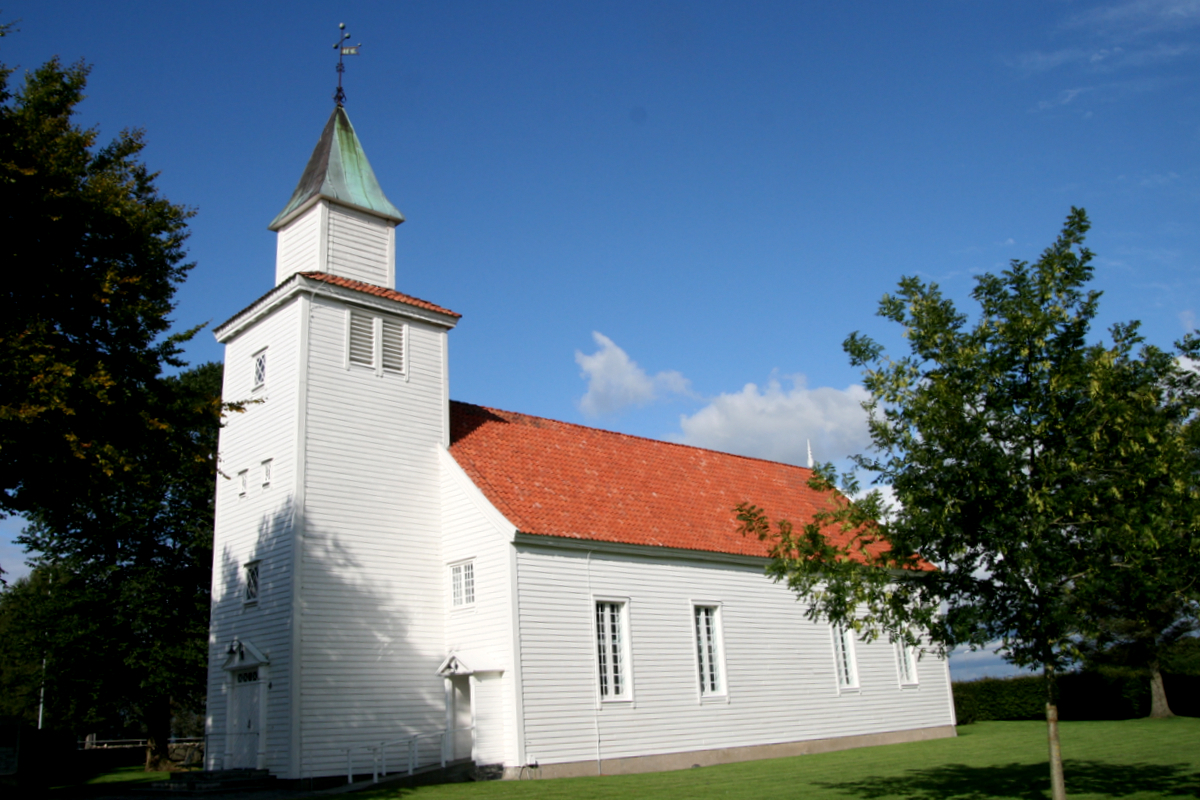
Old Nærbø Church

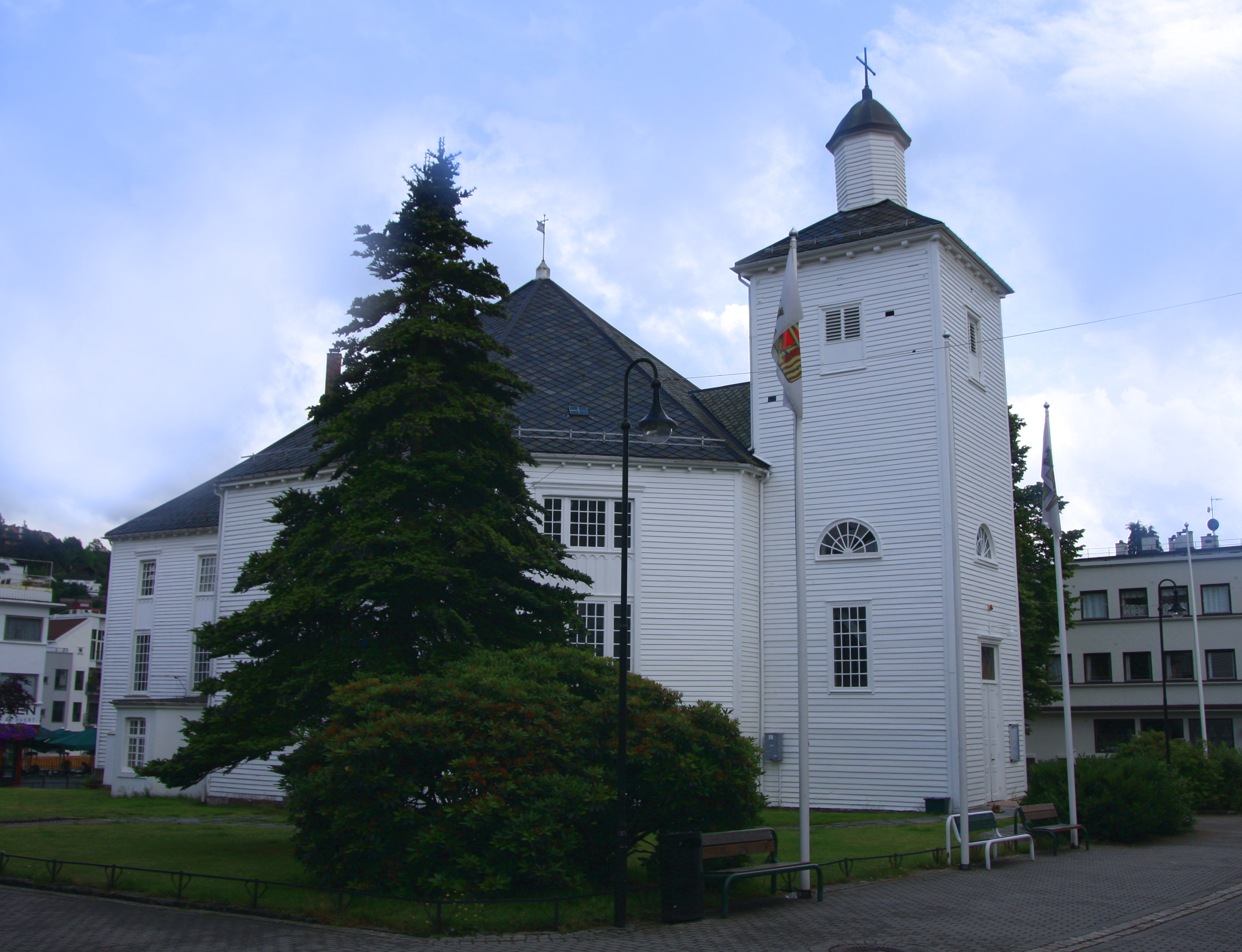
Flekkefjord Church

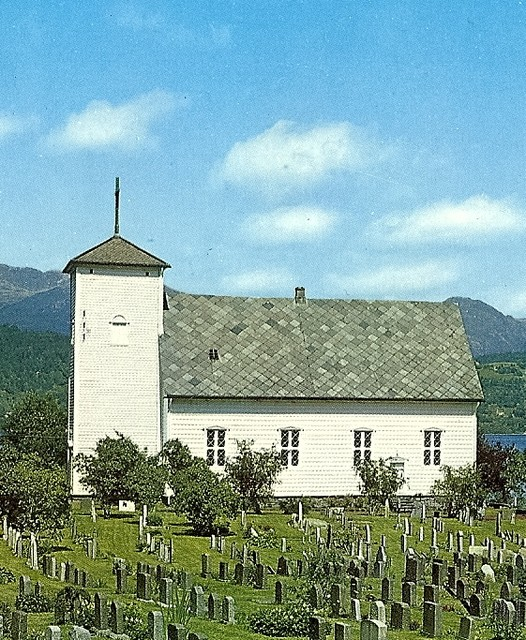
Vikøy Church

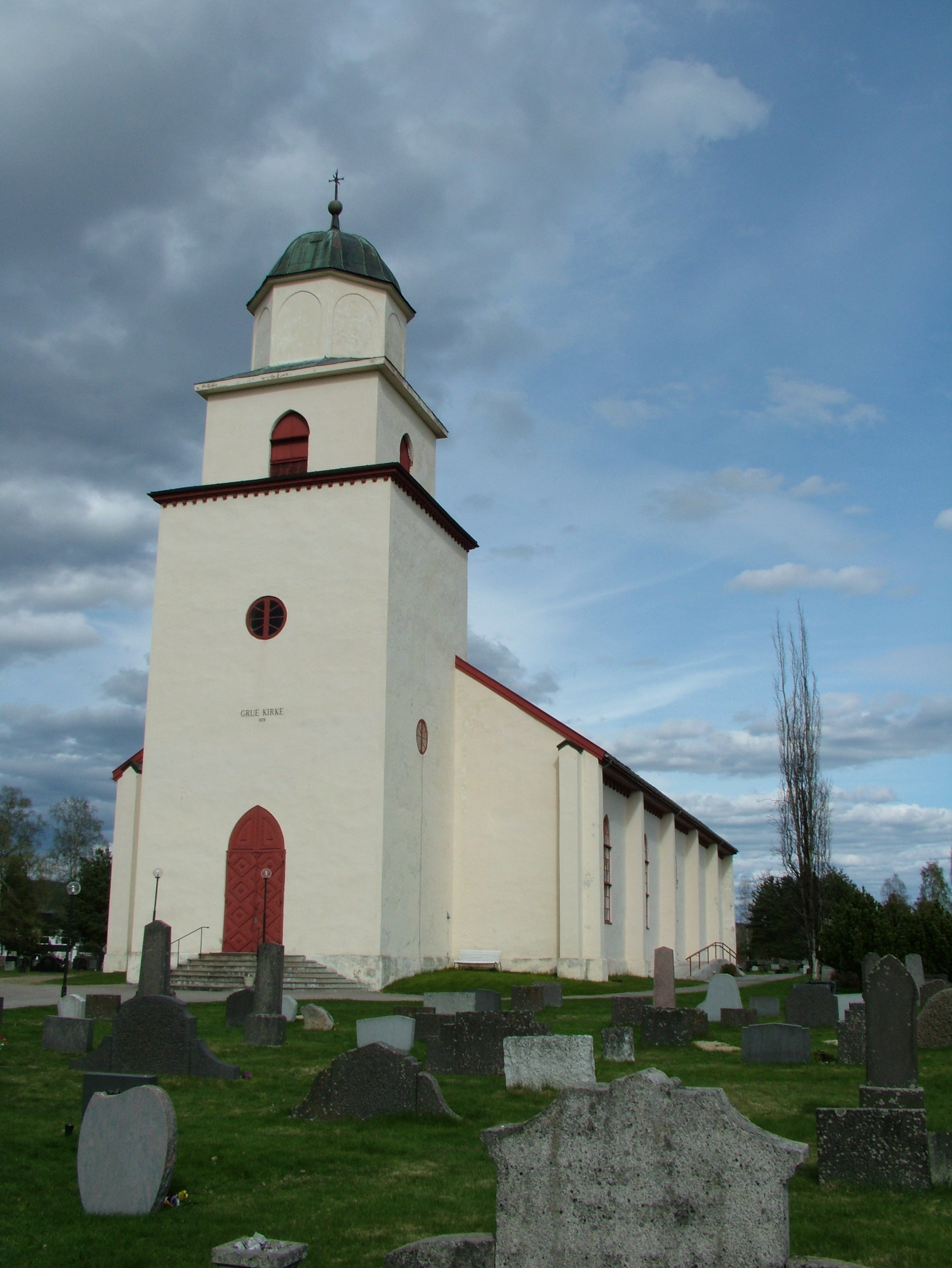
Grue Church
