= Ingebrigt Vik =

Norwegian sculptor

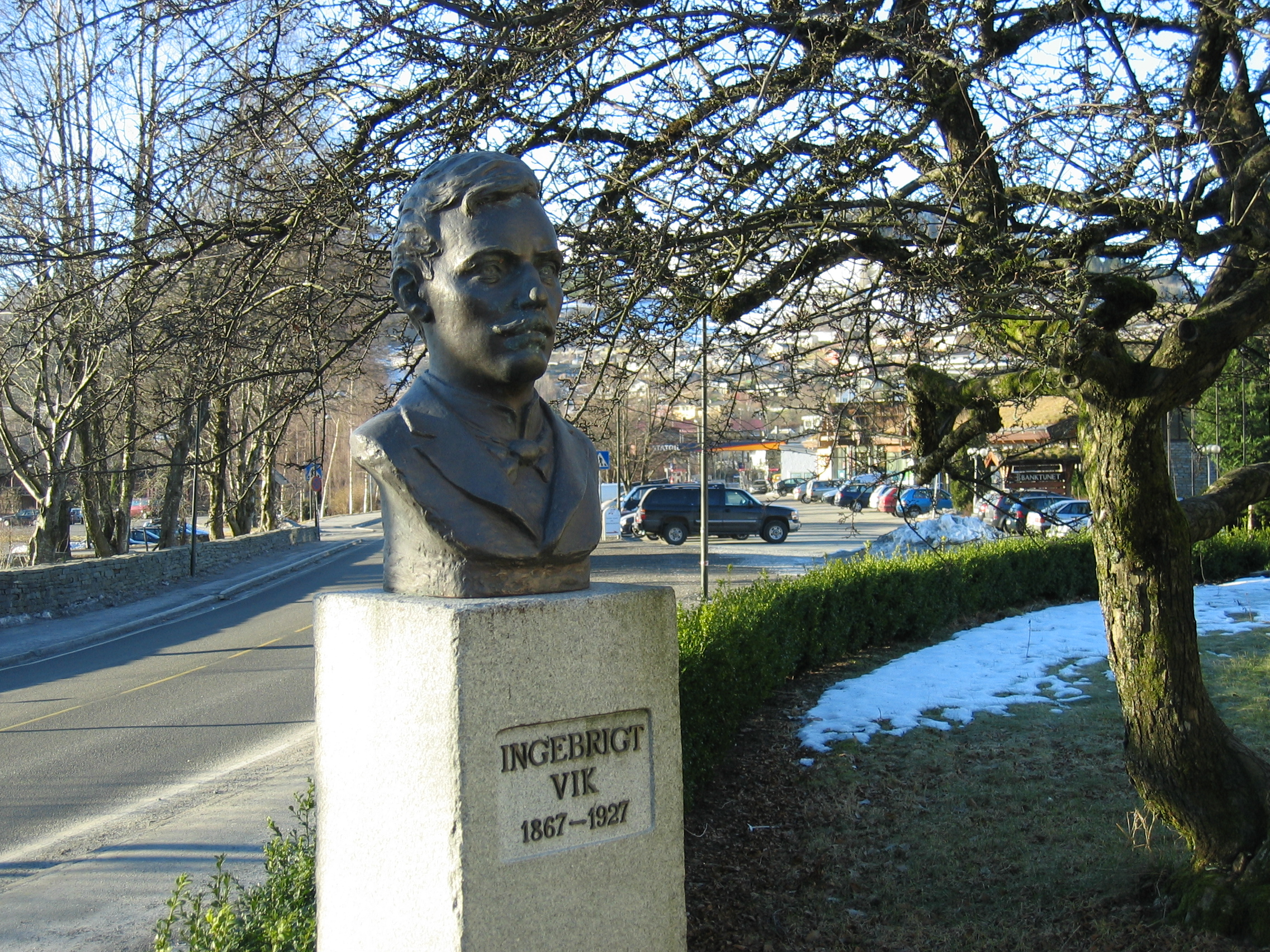
Bust of Ingebrigt Vik at Ingebrigt Vik Museum

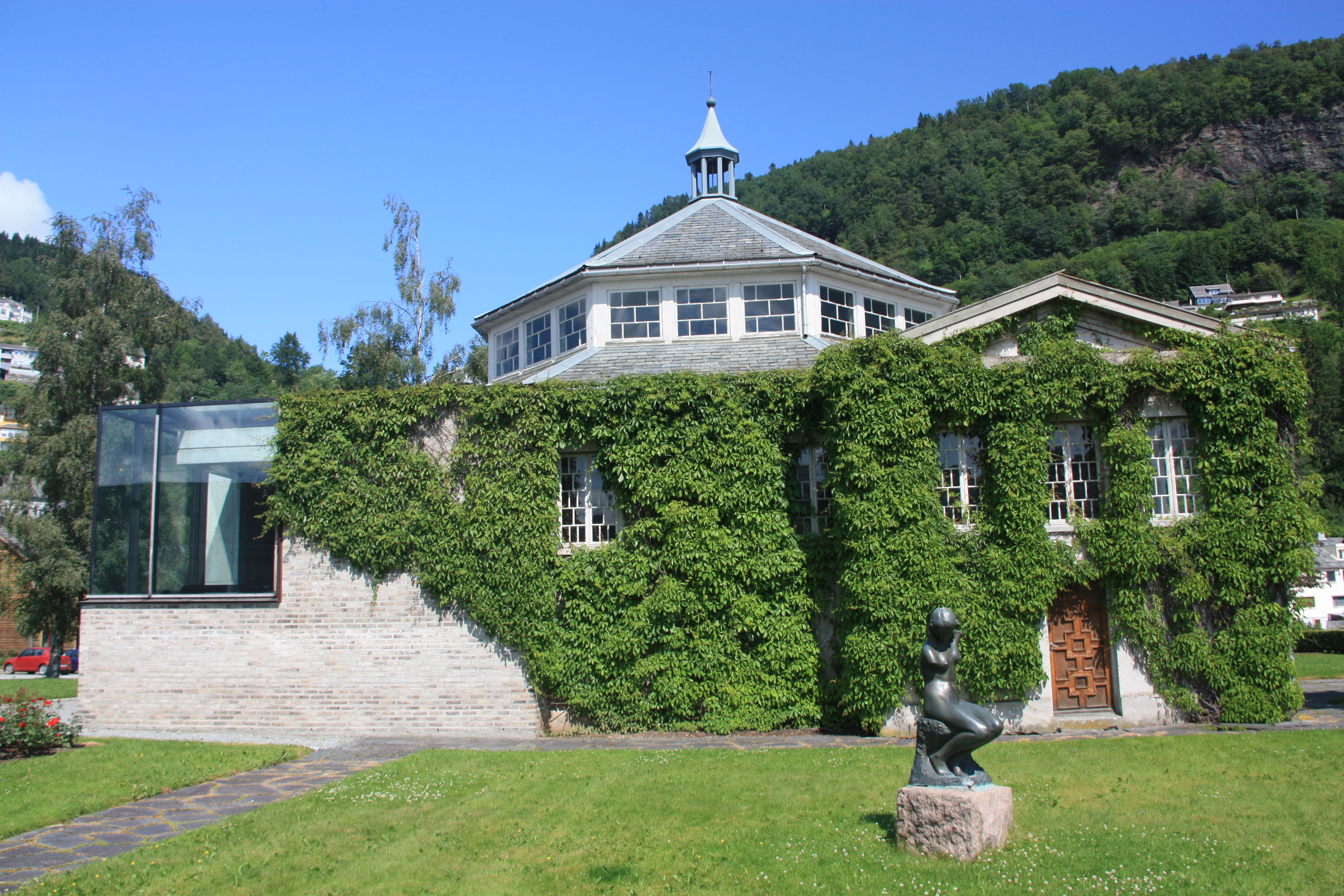
Ingebrigt Vik Museum in Øystese

Ingebrigt Vik (5 March 1867 – 22 March 1927) was a Norwegian sculptor. Vik is regarded as having been one of Norway's greatest sculptors from the first part of the 20th century.

== Biography ==
Ingebrigt Vik was born in the village of Øystese in Vikør Municipality in Søndre Bergenhus county, Norway. He was the son of Hans Gunnarson Tveit (1832–1901) and Ingebjørg Torgeirsdotter Vik (1841–1902). He grew up in Øystese and began as a wood carver in his father's factory. He trained as an artist at the Royal Danish Academy of Fine Arts in Copenhagen from 1889 to 1891. After surgery for tuberculosis in his left knee, he returned home to recover. In 1903 he moved to Paris and attended Académie Colarossi where he trained with sculptor Jean Antoine Injalbert. In 1906, he was assigned the Houens legat and studied in Italy.

Some of Vik's best known works are in the National Gallery of Norway, including Ung Pike (1903) Sittende ung pike (1908) and Ynglingen (1913). In the theatre gardens in Bergen there is his statue of the composer Edvard Grieg (1915) in bronze. His statue of Norwegian mathematician Niels Henrik Abel was first shown publicly at the Autumn Exhibition in Oslo in 1904. It stands today in front of Niels Henrik Abels hus at the University of Oslo. Many of his works stand in the Ingebrigt Vik Museum.

== Ingebrigt Vik Museum ==
Ingebrigt Vik Museum is an art museum in the village of Øystese. When Ingebrigt Vik died in 1927, he bequeathed his artistic production, totaling over one hundred sculptures, to his home district. The collection consists of work in terracotta, plaster, marble and bronze. The building was designed by the architect Torgeir Alvsaker (1875-1971) and was inaugurated in 1934. The museum is operated in conjunction with Hardanger og Voss Museum, an organization of museums in Hordaland County, Norway.

== Related reading ==
- Billedhuggeren Ingebrigt Vik: Utg. av Ingebrigt Vik museum (Bergen: John Grieg Forlag, 1967)
