= Vikøy Church =

Church in Vestland, Norway

- Vikøy kyrkje
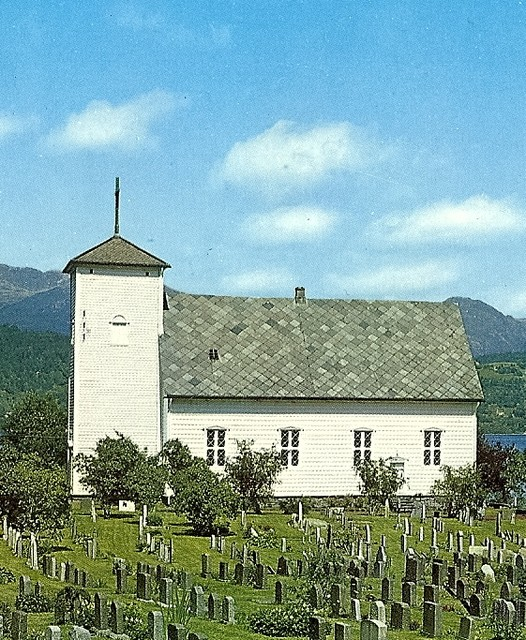
- View of the church
- Vikøy Church
- 60°20′57″N 6°10′35″E
- Location: Kvam Municipality, Vestland
- Country: Norway
- Denomination: Church of Norway
- Previous denomination: Catholic Church
- Churchmanship: Evangelical Lutheran

History
- Status: Parish church
- Founded: 13th century
- Consecrated: 24 July 1838

Architecture
- Functional status: Active
- Architect: Hans Linstow
- Architectural type: Long church
- Completed: 1838 (188 years ago)

Specifications
- Capacity: 300
- Materials: Wood

Administration
- Diocese: Bjørgvin bispedømme
- Deanery: Hardanger og Voss prosti
- Parish: Vikøy
- Norwegian Cultural Heritage Site
- Type: Church
- Status: Listed
- ID: 85846

Vikøy Church (Norwegian: Vikøy kyrkje) is a parish church of the Church of Norway in Kvam Municipality in Vestland county, Norway. It is located in the village of Vikøy, a few kilometers south of the municipal centre of Norheimsund. It is one of the churches for the Vikøy parish which is part of the Hardanger og Voss prosti (deanery) in the Diocese of Bjørgvin. The white, wooden church was built in a long church design in 1838 using plans drawn up by the architect Hans Linstow. The church seats about 300 people.

== History ==
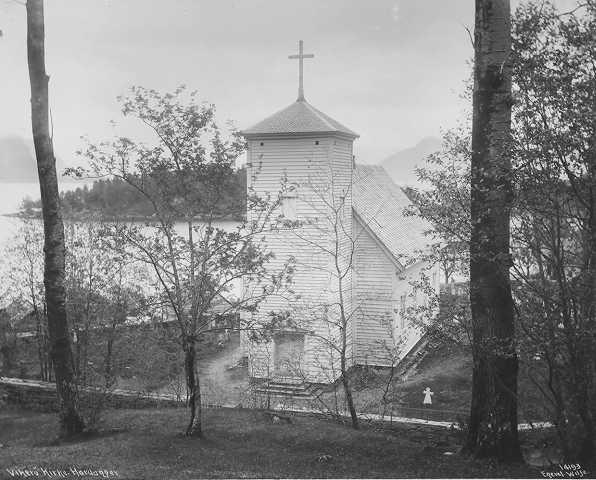
View of the church in 1912

The earliest existing historical records of the church date back to the year 1316, but the church was built before that time. The first church at Vikøy was a wooden stave church that likely was built during the 13th century. The original church was described as a triple-nave stave church with an open air corridor surrounding the building. During the centuries, the old church was restored and renovated several times, with parts of the old stave structure being replaced with timber-framed work. In 1712, the tower was rebuilt. In 1721, a church inspection noted that the nave measured 15 by 8.8 metres (49 ft × 29 ft) and the choir measured 6.3 by 6.9 metres (21 ft × 23 ft). There was also a 2.5-by-3.1-metre (8 ft 2 in × 10 ft 2 in) church porch.

In 1814, this church served as an election church (Norwegian: valgkirke). Together with more than 300 other parish churches across Norway, it was a polling station for elections to the 1814 Norwegian Constituent Assembly which wrote the Constitution of Norway. This was Norway's first national elections. Each church parish was a constituency that elected people called "electors" who later met together in each county to elect the representatives for the assembly that was to meet at Eidsvoll Manor later that year.

In the spring of 1836, the old church was torn down. During the demolition, several coins were found under the floor of the church, the oldest of which was from the 13th century. This has helped to date the original construction of the church. Soon after, work on a replacement church on the same site began. The new church was built using drawings by the architect Hans Linstow under the direction of the lead builder Lars Endresen Rosseland. The new long church had a 14.5-by-9.14-metre (47.6 ft × 30.0 ft) nave with a 7-by-9.14-metre (23.0 ft × 30.0 ft) choir, with a 4.6-by-4.4-metre (15 ft × 14 ft) church porch with a tower above it. The new building was consecrated on 24 July 1838.

In 1985, the church was extensively restored and renovated. An old altarpiece from 1633 was found in the attic of the church during this renovation, having been stored there unused for 100 years. During this renovation, the old altarpiece was restored and placed back in the church sanctuary.

== See also ==
- List of churches in Bjørgvin
