= Steinsdalsfossen =

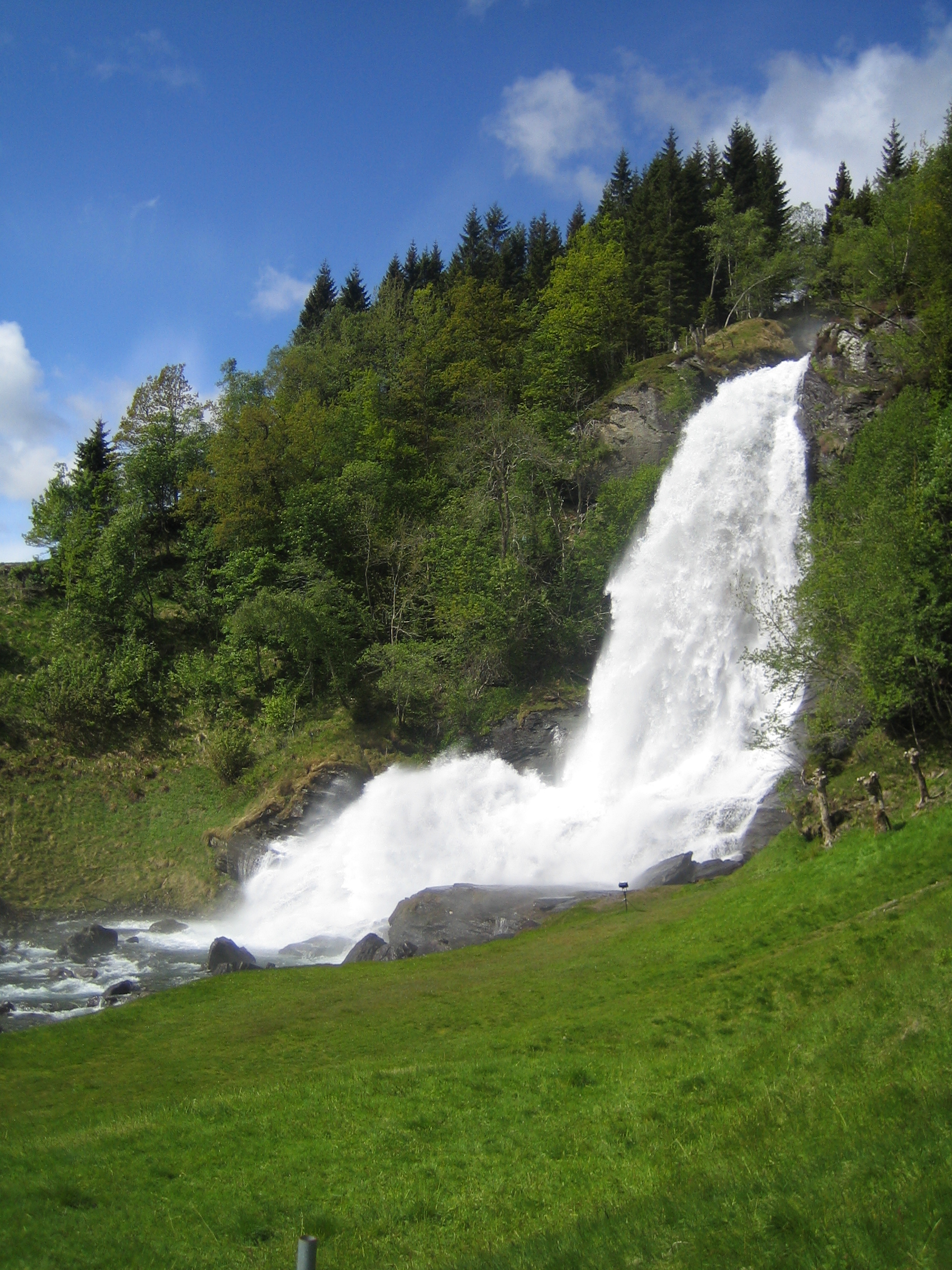
- Steinsdalsfossen is visited by 300,000 tourists each year
- Interactive map of Steinsdalsfossen
- Location: Vestland, Norway
- Coordinates: 60.37079°N 6.103°E
- Type: Plunge
- Elevation: 51 metres (167 ft)
- Total height: 46 metres (151 ft)
- Longest drop: 20 metres (66 ft)

Steinsdalsfossen (also called Øvsthusfossen or Øfsthusfossen) is a waterfall at Øvsthus in the eastern part of the village of Steine in Kvam Municipality in Vestland county, Norway. The waterfall is located about 2 kilometres (1.2 mi) west of the large village of Norheimsund which sits along the Hardangerfjorden.

The waterfall is one of the most visited tourist sites in Norway. From the parking lot, the path goes along the waterfall, up a hill, and behind it where visitors can walk dry-shod "into" the rumbling water. Steinsdalsfossen is 46 metres (151 ft) high, with a main drop of 20 metres (66 ft), and has the greatest volume when the snow melts in May and June. Steinsdalsfossen is part of the Fosselva river that comes from the water of the lake Myklavatnet, located 814 metres (2,671 ft) above sea level in the mountains above the waterfall and flows down into the main Steindalselvi river which flows into the Hardangerfjorden.

== History ==
The waterfall was formed in 1699 when the river found a new race.

The Emperor Wilhelm II of Germany visited Steinsdalsfossen every summer (apart from two years) from 1889 until the start of World War I in 1914.

At Expo 2000 (in Hannover, Germany) Norway was represented with an installation by Marianne Heske of which a 15-metre (49 ft) tall copy of Steinsdalsfossen was an important part.

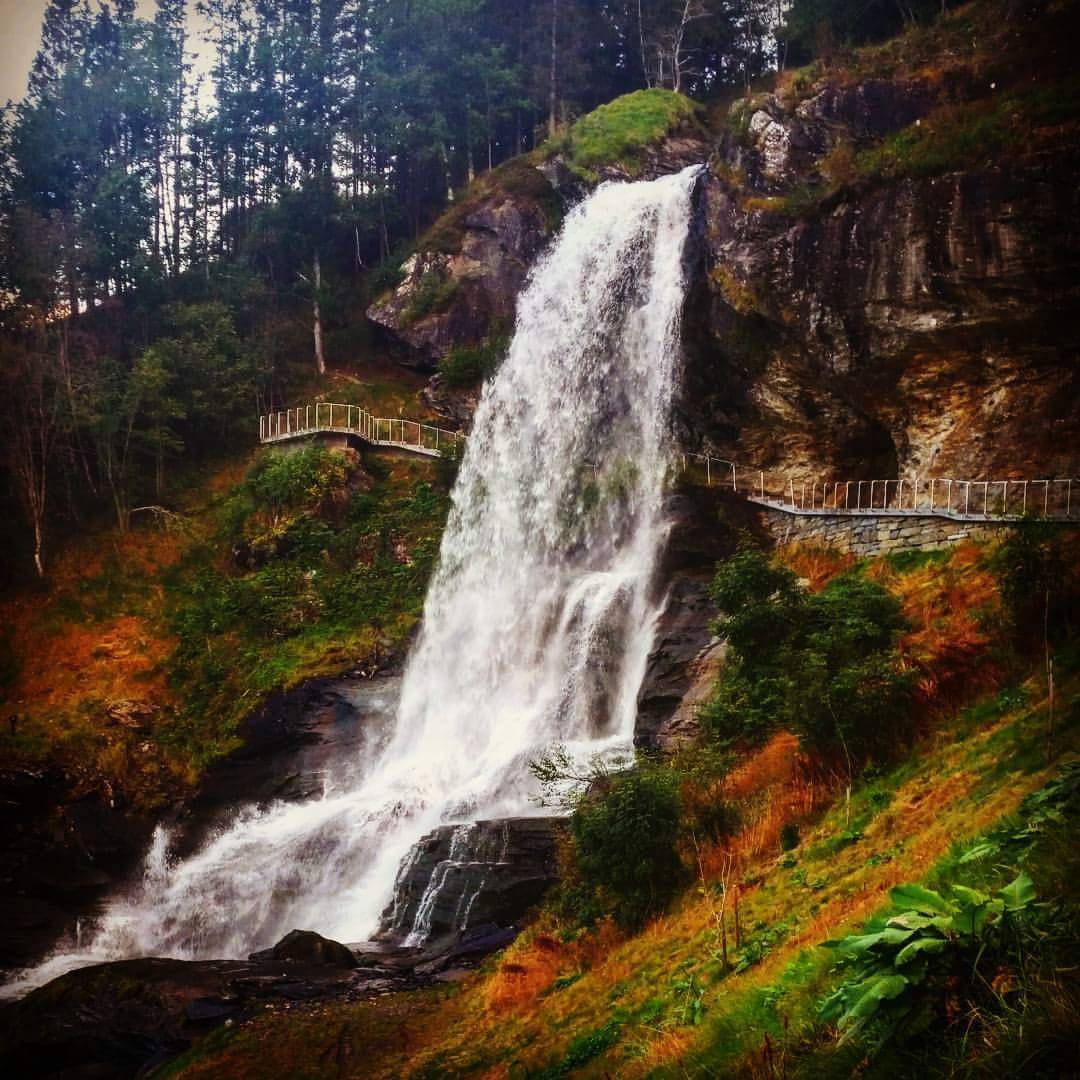
In the fall

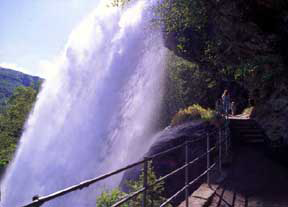
The path behind the falls
Credit: Willy Haraldsen

== See also ==
- List of waterfalls
- Waterfalls of Norway
