= Kvamskogen =

Mountain plateau in Vestland, Norway

- Plateau
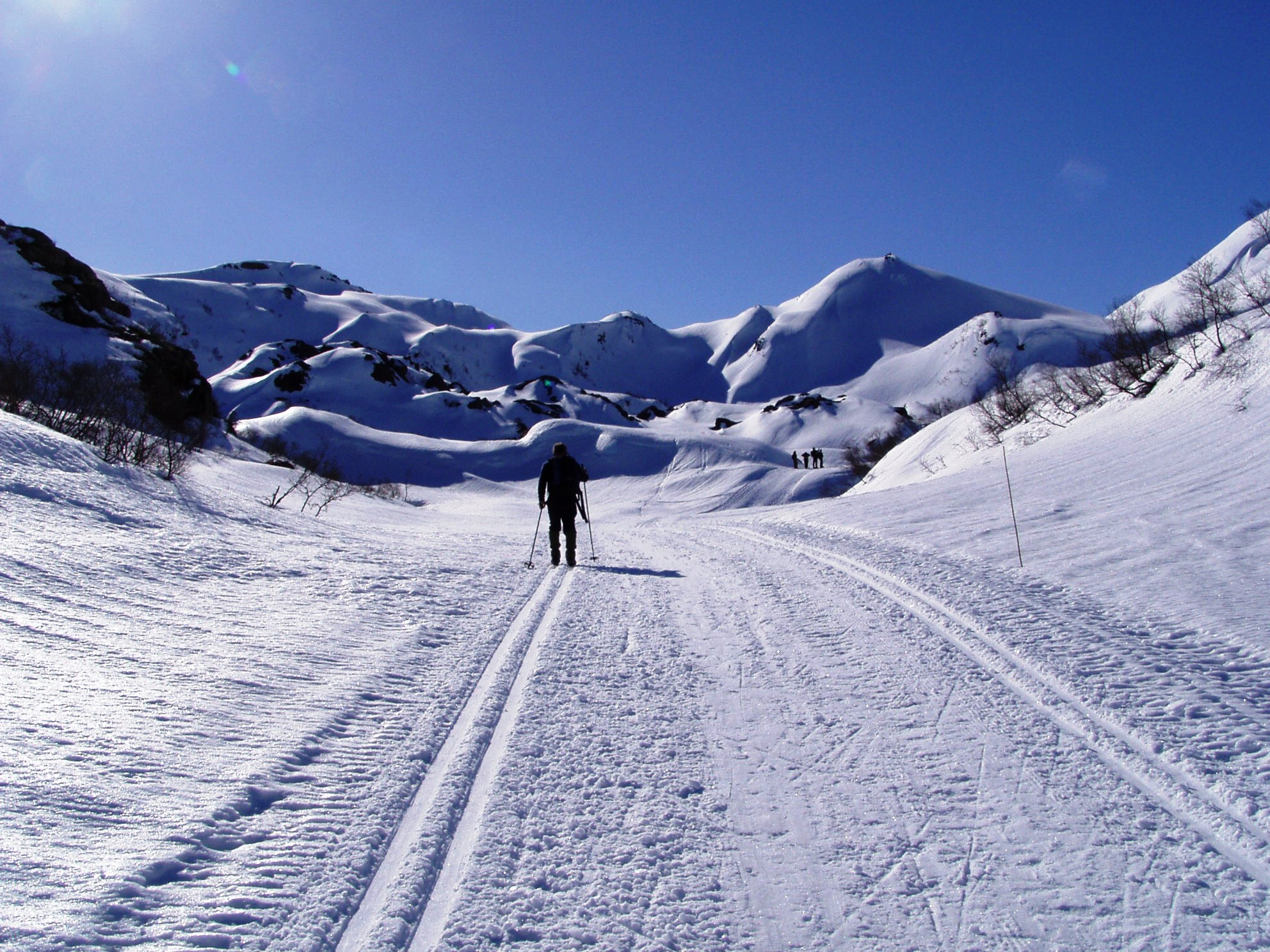
- Skiing to the mountain Såta
- Interactive map of Kvamskogen
- Coordinates: 60.3872°N 5.97101°E
- Location: Vestland, Norway

Kvamskogen (lit. 'Kvam forest') is a forest and mountain plateau in the Hardanger region of Vestland county, Norway. It is located in Samnanger Municipality and Kvam Municipality. Traditionally, the term was used only for the parts of the plateau located in Kvam Municipality, but today it is used for the entire plateau. Kvamskogen contains several ski resorts, and more than 1700 cabins, the third highest concentration of cabins in the country.

County road 49 runs across the plateau between Tysse in Samnanger Municipality and Norheimsund in Kvam Municipality. The highest point on the mountain pass is 454 metres (1,490 ft) above sea level. In the southwest, the 1,299-metre (4,262 ft) tall mountain Tveitakvitingen sits on the border between Kvam Municipality, Samnanger Municipality, and Bjørnafjorden Municipality. In the northeast, the 1,334-metre (4,377 ft) mountain Fuglafjellet sits in Kvam Municipality and is the highest point on the plateau.

Kvamskogen was developed many years ago as an important holiday resort area for people from the big city of Bergen, especially in the winter season. The area has several alpine resorts and a well-developed network of hiking trails both winter and summer. There are hostels, guesthouses, and a campsite, but the area is primarily characterized by an extensive holiday cabin development, including private, time-share, and rental cabins.
