= Kvam Municipality =

Municipality in Vestland, Norway

Kvam Municipality Kvam herad
- Municipality
- Vikør herred (historic name)
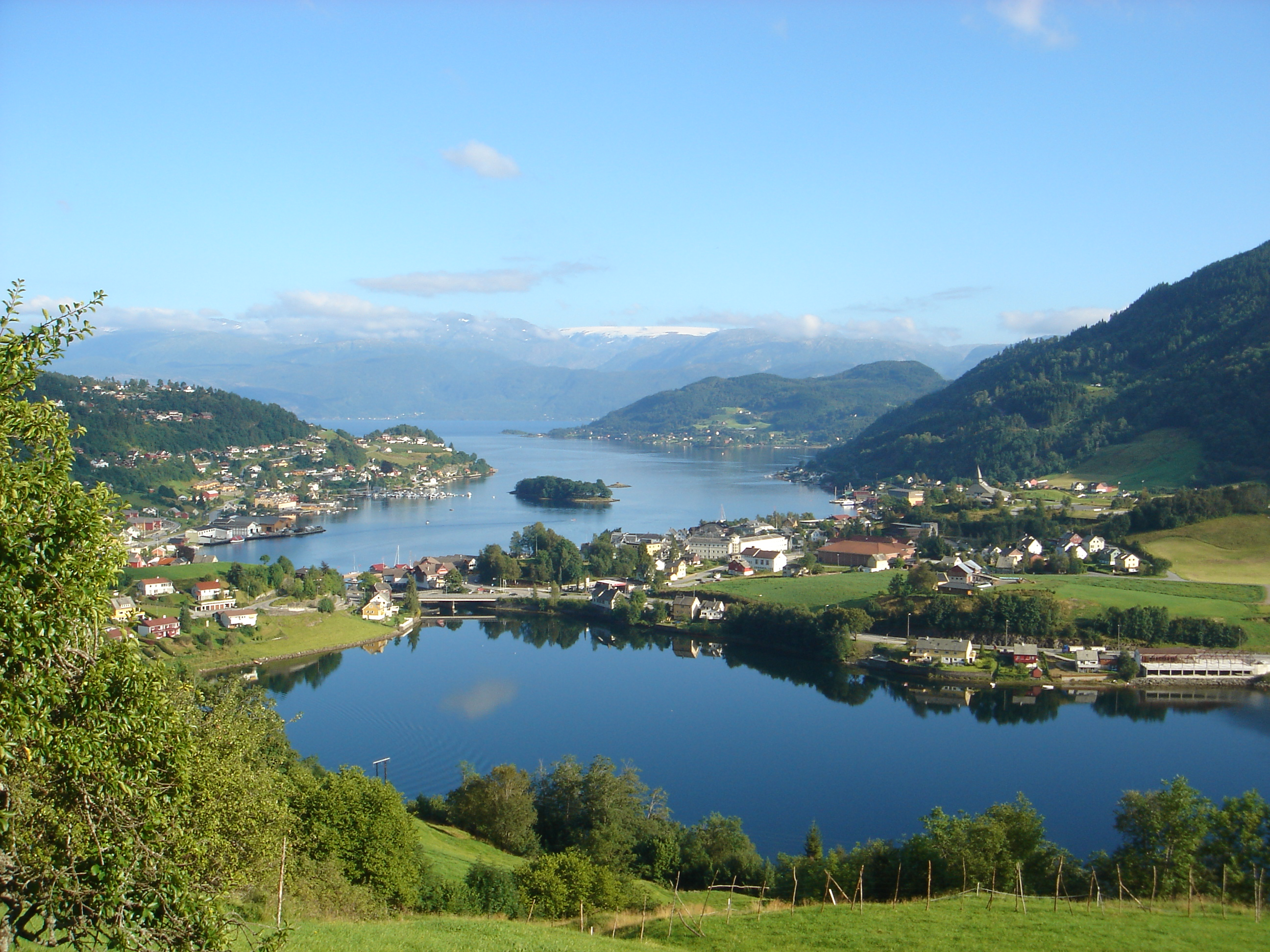
- View of Norheimsund in Kvam

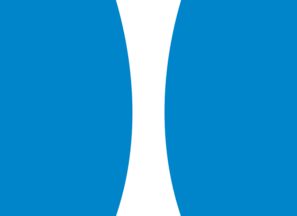
- Flag Coat of arms

- Vestland within Norway

- Kvam within Vestland
- Coordinates: 60°22′12″N 06°08′38″E
- Country: Norway
- County: Vestland
- District: Hardanger
- Established: 1 Jan 1838
  - Created as: Formannskapsdistrikt
- Administrative centre: Norheimsund

Government
  - Mayor (2019): Torgeir Næss (Ap)

Area
  - Total: 616.95 km^{2} (238.21 sq mi)
  - Land: 580.42 km^{2} (224.10 sq mi)
  - Water: 36.53 km^{2} (14.10 sq mi) 5.9%
  - Rank: #187 in Norway
- Highest elevation: 1,334.5 m (4,378 ft)

Population (2025)
  - Total: 8,517
  - Rank: #129 in Norway
  - Density: 13.8/km^{2} (36/sq mi)
  - Change (10 years): ▼ −1%
- Demonym: Kvemming

Official language
  - Norwegian form: Nynorsk
- Time zone: UTC+01:00 (CET)
  - Summer (DST): UTC+02:00 (CEST)
- ISO 3166 code: NO-4622
- Website: Official website

Kvam is a municipality in Vestland county, Norway. The municipality is located along the Hardangerfjorden in the traditional district of Hardanger. The administrative centre of the municipality is the village of Norheimsund. Other larger settlements in the municipality include Øystese, Strandebarm, Ålvik, Tørvikbygd, Omastranda, Vikedal, Vikøy, and Mundheim. Historically, it was named Vikør Municipality.

The 616.95-square-kilometre (238.21 sq mi) municipality is the 187th largest by area out of the 357 municipalities in Norway. Kvam Municipality is the 129th most populous municipality in Norway with a population of 8,517. The municipality's population density is 13.8 inhabitants per square kilometre (36/sq mi) and its population has decreased by 1% over the previous 10-year period.

== General information ==
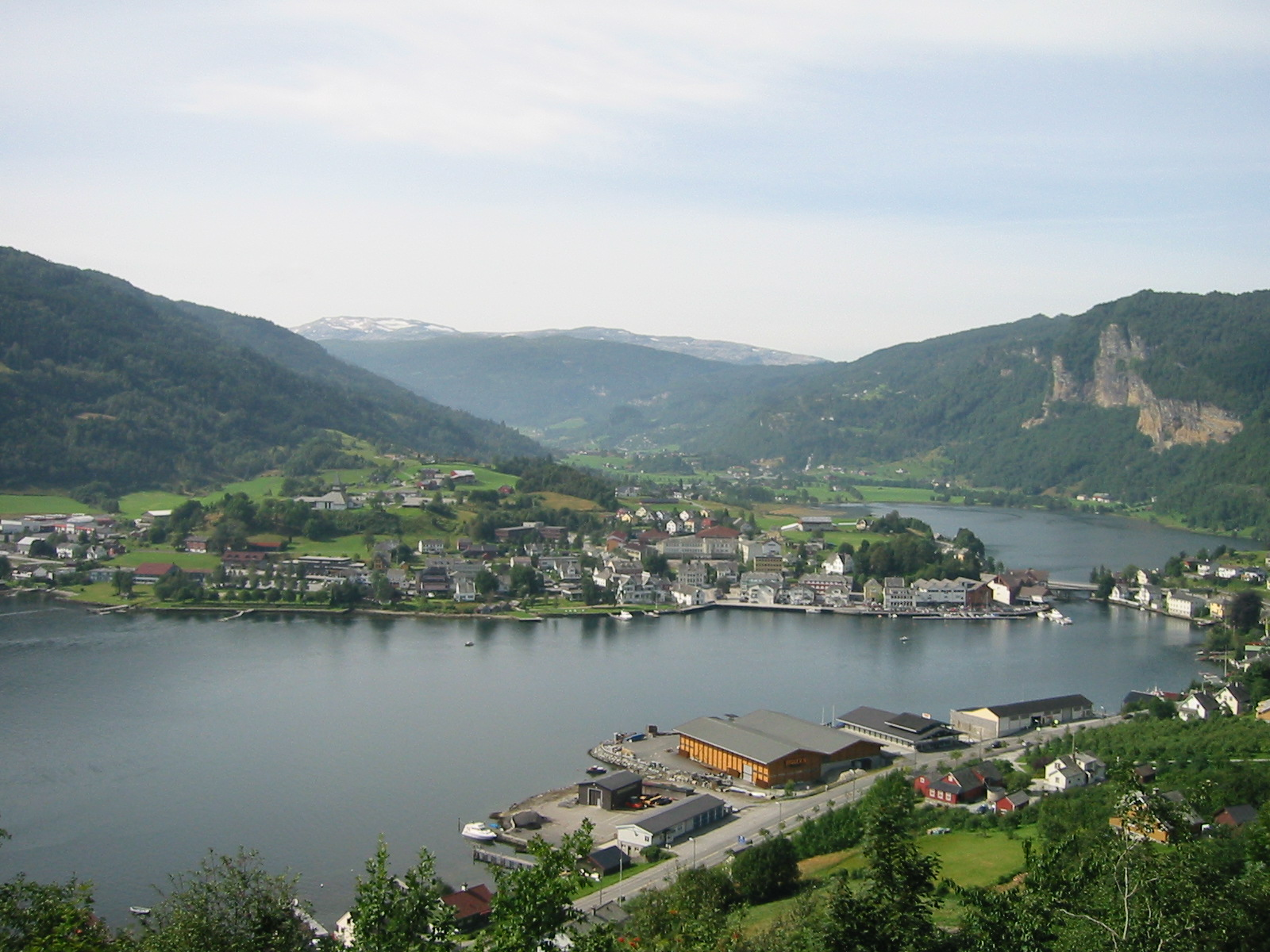
View of the village of Norheimsund

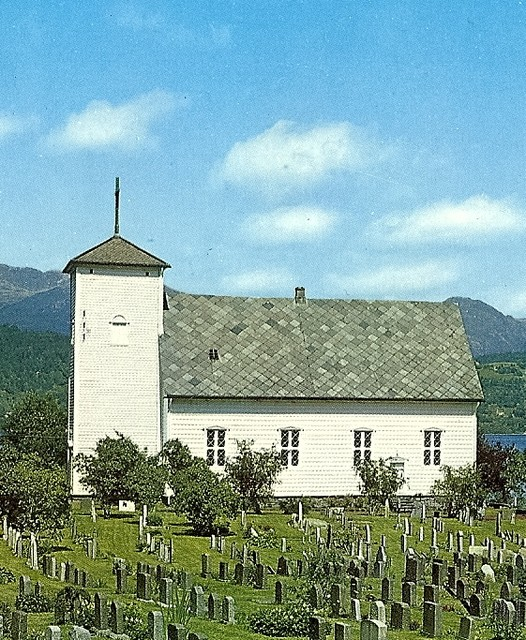
View of Vikøy Church

=== Name ===
The municipality (originally the parish) was first named Vikør after the old Vikøy farm (Old Norse: Víkeyjar) since the first Vikøy Church was built there. The first element is vík which means "small bay", "cove", or "inlet". The last element is the genitive case of ey which means "island". This is likely referring to the small island in the little cove just east of the farm.

On 1 December 1911, a royal resolution changed the name of the municipality to Kvam, bringing back an old name for the area (Old Norse: Hvammr). The name is identical to the word hvammr which means "small valley" or "grassy hollow", possibly referring the Steinsdalen valley west of Norheimsund.

Kvam Municipality (Norwegian: Kvam herad) is one of only three municipalities in Norway that uses the word herad instead of kommune in its name. Both Norwegian words can be translated to be "municipality", but herad is an older word that historically was only used for rural municipalities. Municipalities can choose to use one or the other, but most use the more modern kommune. From 1838 until the mid-20th century, most municipalities used herad or herred (using the Nynorsk or Bokmål spelling) for their name, but after some legal changes in the law on municipalities in the 1950s and onwards, most municipalities switched to kommune. The only other municipalities to use herad in 2026 are Voss Municipality and Ulvik Municipality. There are also a few municipalities with herad in the name such as Kvinnherad Municipality.

=== Coat of arms ===
The coat of arms was granted on 27 November 1981. The official blazon is "Azure, a pale pattee argent" (Norwegian: I blått ein innsvinga sølv stolpe). This means the arms have a blue field (background) and the ordinary is a pale that curves inwards on each side. The ordinary has a tincture of argent which means it is commonly colored white, but if it is made out of metal, then silver is used. The arms were designed to look like the Fyksesund, a narrow fjord in the municipality. The shape of the fjord is that it is narrower in the middle and this is symbolized in the design. The arms were designed by Magnus Hardeland. The municipal flag has the same design as the coat of arms.

=== Churches ===
The Church of Norway has four parishes (sokn) within Kvam Municipality. It is part of the Hardanger og Voss prosti (deanery) in the Diocese of Bjørgvin.

Churches in Kvam Municipality
Parish (sokn)	Church name	Location of the church	Year built
Strandebarm	Strandebarm Church	Strandebarm	1876
Vikøy	Norheimsund Church	Norheimsund	1992
Vikøy	Vikøy Church	Vikøy	1838
Øystese	Øystese Church	Øystese	1868
Ålvik	Ålvik Church	Ålvik	1962

== History ==
The old parish of Vikør was established as a municipality on 1 January 1838 (see formannskapsdistrikt law). According to the 1835 census, the parish had a population of 2,321. On 1 January 1882, a small area of Ullensvang Municipality (population: 22) was transferred to Vikør Municipality. In 1912, the municipality changed its name from "Vikør" to "Kvam".

During the 1960s, there were many municipal mergers across Norway due to the work of the Schei Committee. On 1 January 1965, the Åsgrenda area on the Folgefonna peninsula (population: 61) was moved from Kvam Municipality to the neighboring Ullensvang Municipality. On the same date, Kvam Municipality also gained a considerable amount of territory, making it a much larger municipality. The following places were merged to create a new, larger Kvam Municipality a population of 9,119:

- most of Kvam Municipality (population: 6,759) except for Åsegrenda which was moved to Ullensvang Municipality
- the part of Jondal Municipality that was located on the northwest side of the Hardangerfjord around the village of Tørvikbygd (population: 515)
- most of Strandebarm Municipality (population: 1,545), except for the Kysnesstranda area which went to Jondal Municipality
- the Mundheim area of Varaldsøy Municipality (population: 300)

== Geography ==
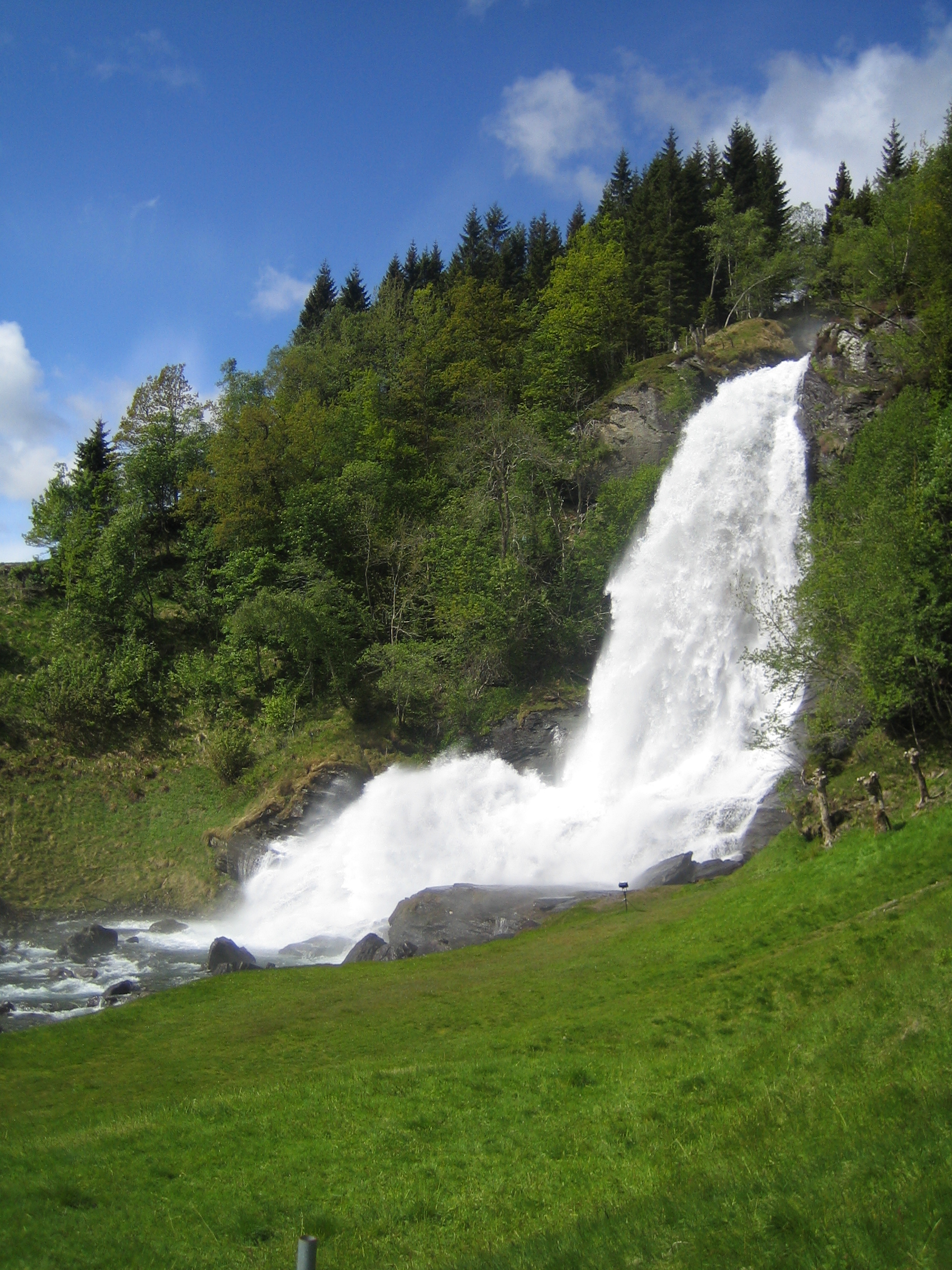
View of the Steinsdalsfossen waterfall

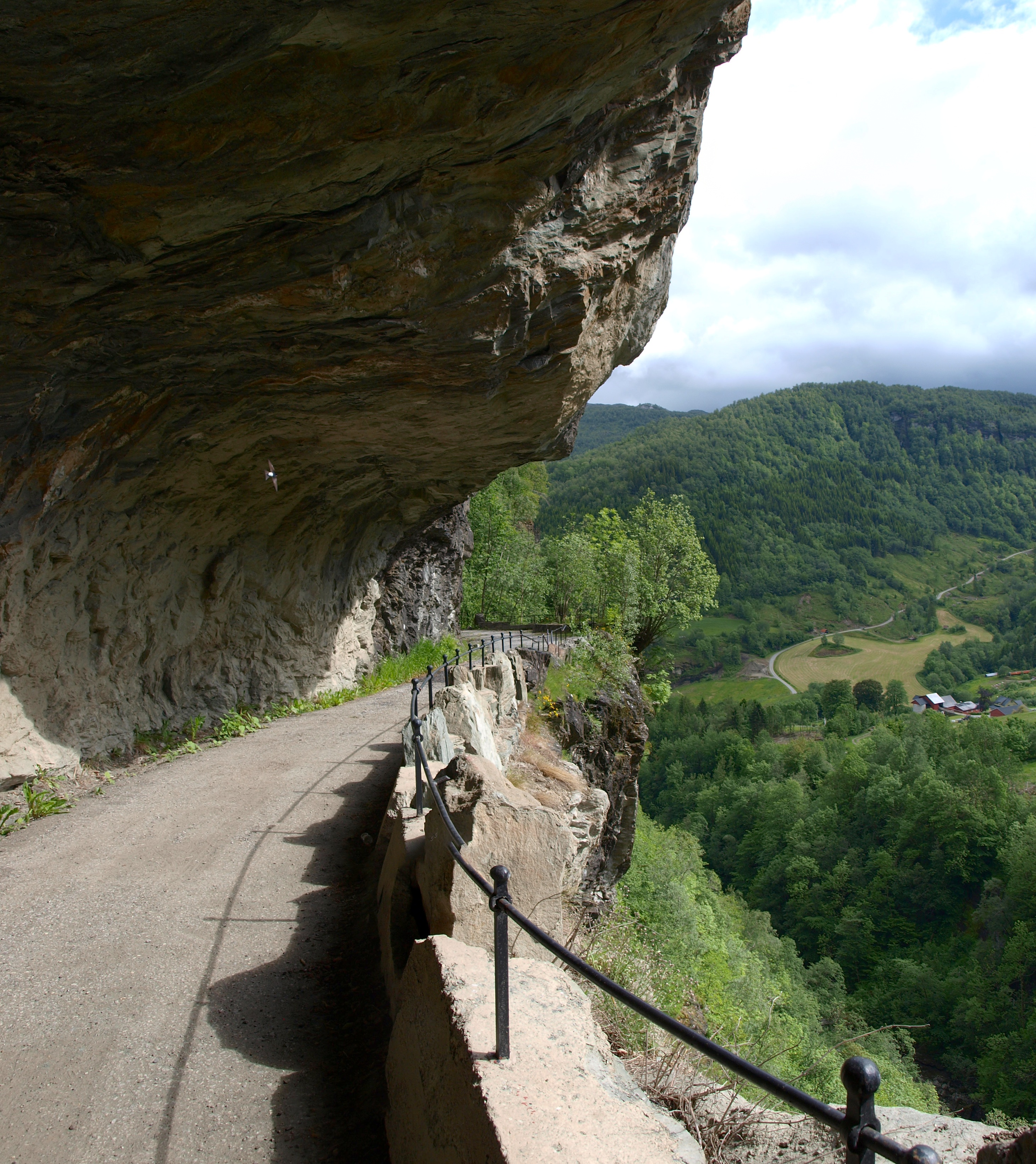
Old road in Kvam

Kvam Municipality borders Voss Municipality to the north and east; Vaksdal Municipality, Samnanger Municipality, and Bjørnafjorden Municipality to the west; and the Hardangerfjorden to the south. The Fyksesund fjord branches off the main fjord and heads north into the municipality. The Fyksesund Landscape Park surrounds the inner part of the Fyksesund, north of the Fyksesund Bridge. The largest lakes are Bjølsegrøvvatnet and Holmavatnet. In addition a portion of Hamlagrøvatnet is located in Kvam Municipality. The Kvamskogen plateau lies west of Norheimsund and is home to hundreds of holiday cabins. The Steinsdalsfossen waterfall, located in Steine is one of the most visited tourist attractions in Norway. The highest point in the municipality is the 1,334.5-metre (4,378 ft) tall mountain Fuglafjellet.

== Population ==
Historical population

Year	Pop.	±% p.a.
1845	2,444	—
1855	2,619	+0.69%
1865	2,853	+0.86%
1875	2,988	+0.46%
1891	3,205	+0.44%
1900	3,539	+1.11%
1910	3,613	+0.21%

Year	Pop.	±% p.a.
1920	3,993	+1.01%
1930	4,288	+0.72%
1946	5,232	+1.25%
1951	5,530	+1.11%
1960	6,525	+1.86%
1970	9,017	+3.29%
1980	8,733	−0.32%

Year	Pop.	±% p.a.
1990	8,773	+0.05%
2000	8,592	−0.21%
2010	8,360	−0.27%
2020	8,457	+0.12%
2023	8,531	+0.29%

Note: The municipal borders were changed in 1965, causing a significant change in the population.
Source: Statistics Norway and Norwegian Historical Data Centre

== Government ==
Kvam Municipality is responsible for primary education (through 10th grade), outpatient health services, senior citizen services, welfare and other social services, zoning, economic development, and municipal roads and utilities. The municipality is governed by a municipal council of directly elected representatives. The mayor is indirectly elected by a vote of the municipal council. The municipality is under the jurisdiction of the Hordaland District Court and the Gulating Court of Appeal.

=== Municipal council ===
The municipal council (Heradsstyre) of Kvam Municipality is made up of 27 representatives that are elected to four-year terms. The tables below show the current and historical composition of the council by political party.

Kvam heradsstyre 2023–2027
Party name (in Nynorsk)	Number of representatives
Labour Party (Arbeidarpartiet)	6
Progress Party (Framstegspartiet)	6
Green Party (Miljøpartiet Dei Grøne)	1
Conservative Party (Høgre)	4
Industry and Business Party (Industri‑ og Næringspartiet)	1
Christian Democratic Party (Kristeleg Folkeparti)	2
Red Party (Raudt)	1
Centre Party (Senterpartiet)	4
Socialist Left Party (Sosialistisk Venstreparti)	1
Liberal Party (Venstre)	1
Total number of members:	27

Kvam heradsstyre 2019–2023
Party name (in Nynorsk)	Number of representatives
Labour Party (Arbeidarpartiet)	6
Progress Party (Framstegspartiet)	4
Green Party (Miljøpartiet Dei Grøne)	2
Conservative Party (Høgre)	2
Christian Democratic Party (Kristeleg Folkeparti)	3
Red Party (Raudt)	1
Centre Party (Senterpartiet)	8
Socialist Left Party (Sosialistisk Venstreparti)	1
Total number of members:	27

Kvam heradsstyre 2015–2019
Party name (in Nynorsk)	Number of representatives
Labour Party (Arbeidarpartiet)	6
Progress Party (Framstegspartiet)	3
Green Party (Miljøpartiet Dei Grøne)	1
Conservative Party (Høgre)	3
Christian Democratic Party (Kristeleg Folkeparti)	3
Centre Party (Senterpartiet)	9
Socialist Left Party (Sosialistisk Venstreparti)	1
Liberal Party (Venstre)	1
Total number of members:	27

Kvam heradsstyre 2011–2015
Party name (in Nynorsk)	Number of representatives
Labour Party (Arbeidarpartiet)	4
Progress Party (Framstegspartiet)	3
Conservative Party (Høgre)	4
Christian Democratic Party (Kristeleg Folkeparti)	4
Centre Party (Senterpartiet)	6
Socialist Left Party (Sosialistisk Venstreparti)	1
Liberal Party (Venstre)	2
Kvam Cross-Party List (Kvam Tverrpolitiske liste)	3
Total number of members:	27

Kvam heradsstyre 2007–2011
Party name (in Nynorsk)	Number of representatives
Labour Party (Arbeidarpartiet)	6
Progress Party (Framstegspartiet)	2
Conservative Party (Høgre)	4
Christian Democratic Party (Kristeleg Folkeparti)	3
Centre Party (Senterpartiet)	5
Socialist Left Party (Sosialistisk Venstreparti)	1
Liberal Party (Venstre)	3
The Independents (Dei uavhengige)	3
Total number of members:	27

Kvam heradsstyre 2003–2007
Party name (in Nynorsk)	Number of representatives
Labour Party (Arbeidarpartiet)	7
Progress Party (Framstegspartiet)	2
Conservative Party (Høgre)	4
Christian Democratic Party (Kristeleg Folkeparti)	4
Centre Party (Senterpartiet)	6
Socialist Left Party (Sosialistisk Venstreparti)	2
Liberal Party (Venstre)	2
Total number of members:	27

Kvam heradsstyre 1999–2003
Party name (in Nynorsk)	Number of representatives
Labour Party (Arbeidarpartiet)	7
Progress Party (Framstegspartiet)	2
Conservative Party (Høgre)	5
Christian Democratic Party (Kristeleg Folkeparti)	5
Centre Party (Senterpartiet)	7
Socialist Left Party (Sosialistisk Venstreparti)	2
Liberal Party (Venstre)	2
Cross-party local list (Tverrpolitisk grendaliste)	2
Green local list (Grøn bygdeliste)	1
Total number of members:	33

Kvam heradsstyre 1995–1999
Party name (in Nynorsk)	Number of representatives
Labour Party (Arbeidarpartiet)	8
Progress Party (Framstegspartiet)	2
Conservative Party (Høgre)	4
Christian Democratic Party (Kristeleg Folkeparti)	7
Centre Party (Senterpartiet)	12
Socialist Left Party (Sosialistisk Venstreparti)	2
Liberal Party (Venstre)	3
Cross-party local list (Tverrpolitisk Grendeliste)	2
Total number of members:	41

Kvam heradsstyre 1991–1995
Party name (in Nynorsk)	Number of representatives
Labour Party (Arbeidarpartiet)	9
Progress Party (Framstegspartiet)	2
Conservative Party (Høgre)	7
Christian Democratic Party (Kristeleg Folkeparti)	6
Centre Party (Senterpartiet)	12
Socialist Left Party (Sosialistisk Venstreparti)	4
Liberal Party (Venstre)	1
Total number of members:	41

Kvam heradsstyre 1987–1991
Party name (in Nynorsk)	Number of representatives
Labour Party (Arbeidarpartiet)	12
Conservative Party (Høgre)	9
Christian Democratic Party (Kristeleg Folkeparti)	8
Centre Party (Senterpartiet)	7
Socialist Left Party (Sosialistisk Venstreparti)	2
Liberal Party (Venstre)	3
Total number of members:	41

Kvam heradsstyre 1983–1987
Party name (in Nynorsk)	Number of representatives
Labour Party (Arbeidarpartiet)	11
Conservative Party (Høgre)	10
Christian Democratic Party (Kristeleg Folkeparti)	9
Centre Party (Senterpartiet)	7
Socialist Left Party (Sosialistisk Venstreparti)	2
Liberal Party (Venstre)	2
Total number of members:	41

Kvam heradsstyre 1979–1983
Party name (in Nynorsk)	Number of representatives
Labour Party (Arbeidarpartiet)	9
Conservative Party (Høgre)	10
Christian Democratic Party (Kristeleg Folkeparti)	9
New People's Party (Nye Folkepartiet)	1
Centre Party (Senterpartiet)	8
Socialist Left Party (Sosialistisk Venstreparti)	1
Liberal Party (Venstre)	3
Total number of members:	41

Kvam heradsstyre 1975–1979
Party name (in Nynorsk)	Number of representatives
Labour Party (Arbeidarpartiet)	10
Conservative Party (Høgre)	5
Christian Democratic Party (Kristeleg Folkeparti)	10
New People's Party (Nye Folkepartiet)	3
Centre Party (Senterpartiet)	10
Socialist Left Party (Sosialistisk Venstreparti)	2
Liberal Party (Venstre)	1
Total number of members:	41

Kvam heradsstyre 1971–1975
Party name (in Nynorsk)	Number of representatives
Labour Party (Arbeidarpartiet)	12
Conservative Party (Høgre)	4
Christian Democratic Party (Kristeleg Folkeparti)	9
Centre Party (Senterpartiet)	11
Liberal Party (Venstre)	5
Total number of members:	41

Kvam heradsstyre 1967–1971
Party name (in Nynorsk)	Number of representatives
Labour Party (Arbeidarpartiet)	13
Conservative Party (Høgre)	5
Christian Democratic Party (Kristeleg Folkeparti)	8
Centre Party (Senterpartiet)	8
Liberal Party (Venstre)	7
Total number of members:	41

Kvam heradsstyre 1963–1967
Party name (in Nynorsk)	Number of representatives
Labour Party (Arbeidarpartiet)	9
Conservative Party (Høgre)	3
Christian Democratic Party (Kristeleg Folkeparti)	5
Centre Party (Senterpartiet)	4
Liberal Party (Venstre)	4
Total number of members:	25

Kvam heradsstyre 1959–1963
Party name (in Nynorsk)	Number of representatives
Labour Party (Arbeidarpartiet)	9
Conservative Party (Høgre)	2
Christian Democratic Party (Kristeleg Folkeparti)	6
Centre Party (Senterpartiet)	5
Liberal Party (Venstre)	3
Total number of members:	25

Kvam heradsstyre 1955–1959
Party name (in Nynorsk)	Number of representatives
Labour Party (Arbeidarpartiet)	8
Conservative Party (Høgre)	1
Christian Democratic Party (Kristeleg Folkeparti)	6
Farmers' Party (Bondepartiet)	6
Liberal Party (Venstre)	4
Total number of members:	25

Kvam heradsstyre 1951–1955
Party name (in Nynorsk)	Number of representatives
Labour Party (Arbeidarpartiet)	8
Christian Democratic Party (Kristeleg Folkeparti)	5
Farmers' Party (Bondepartiet)	6
Liberal Party (Venstre)	5
Total number of members:	24

Kvam heradsstyre 1947–1951
Party name (in Nynorsk)	Number of representatives
Labour Party (Arbeidarpartiet)	5
Christian Democratic Party (Kristeleg Folkeparti)	2
Farmers' Party (Bondepartiet)	3
Liberal Party (Venstre)	5
List of workers, fishermen, and small farmholders (Arbeidarar, fiskarar, småbrukarar liste)	1
Local List(s) (Lokale lister)	8
Total number of members:	24

Kvam heradsstyre 1945–1947
Party name (in Nynorsk)	Number of representatives
Labour Party (Arbeidarpartiet)	5
Liberal Party (Venstre)	4
List of workers, fishermen, and small farmholders (Arbeidarar, fiskarar, småbrukarar liste)	1
Local List(s) (Lokale lister)	14
Total number of members:	24

Kvam heradsstyre 1937–1941*
Party name (in Nynorsk)	Number of representatives
Labour Party (Arbeidarpartiet)	5
Liberal Party (Venstre)	7
Joint List(s) of Non-Socialist Parties (Borgarlege Felleslister)	12
Total number of members:	24
Note: Due to the German occupation of Norway during World War II, no elections were held for new municipal councils until after the war ended in 1945.

=== Mayors ===
The mayor (Nynorsk: ordførar) of Kvam Municipality is the political leader of the municipality and the chairperson of the municipal council. In 2007, Kvam Municipality participated in a trial where the mayor was directly elected. The sitting mayor, Astrid Selsvold, won the election with 26.7% of the votes. The following people have held this position:

- 1838–1839: Fredrich Christian Bruun
- 1840–1843: Torgeir P. Aarhus
- 1844–1857: Gjermund N. Skaar
- 1858–1859: Ola S. Aksnes
- 1860–1865: Johannes S. Neteland
- 1866–1885: Nils N. Skaar, Sr.
- 1886–1887: Lars Lofthus
- 1888–1919: Nils N. Skaar, Jr.
- 1919–1922: Hans Jakobson Vik
- 1923–1931: Jakob N. Vik
- 1932–1937: Jakob H. Vik
- 1938–1940: Lars Matre
- 1940–1945: Jakob H. Vik (NS)
- 1945–1945: Lars Matre
- 1946–1960: Olav L. Skeie
- 1960–1975: Olav M. Laupsa (KrF)
- 1976–1983: Guttorm Skeie (Sp)
- 1984–1987: Johannes Waage (KrF)
- 1988–1989: Sigvard Berge (Ap)
- 1990–1991: Guttorm Skeie (Sp)
- 1992–1993: Sigvard Berge (Ap)
- 1994–2003: Martin Vik (Sp)
- 2003–2011: Astrid Farestveit Selsvold (Ap)
- 2011–2015: Asbjørn Tolo (H)
- 2015–2019: Jostein Ljones (Sp)
- 2019–present: Torgeir Næss (Ap)

== Notable people ==
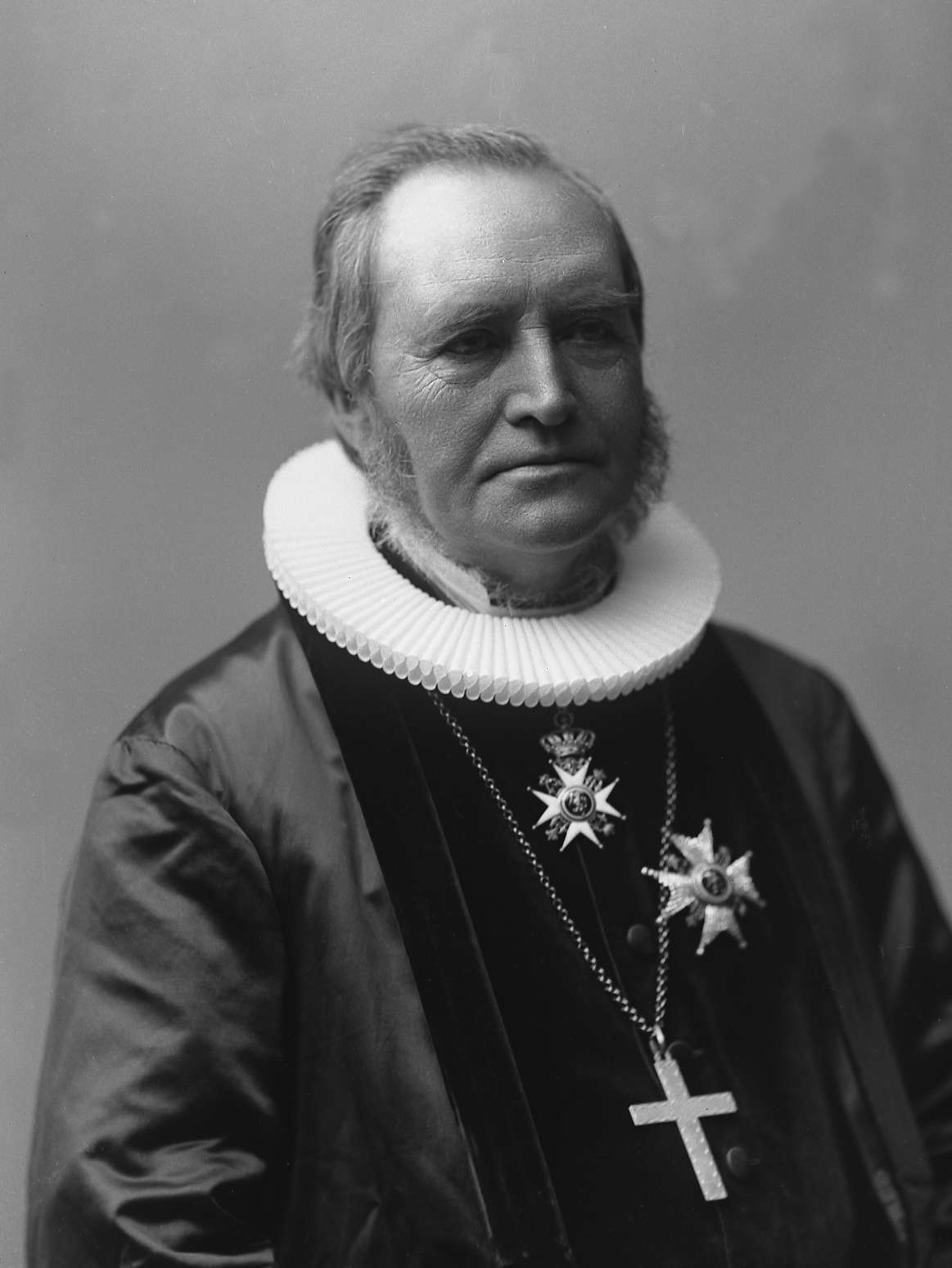
Johannes Nilssøn Skaar

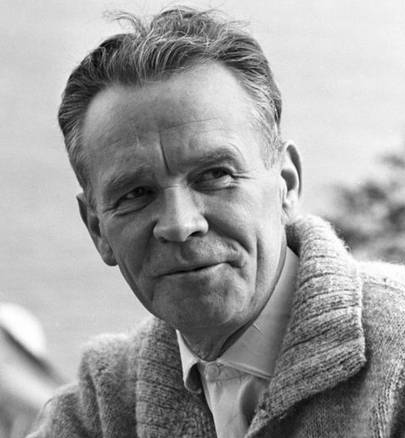
Geirr Tveitt)

- Johannes Skaar (1828 in Øystese – 1904), the Bishop of the Diocese of Nidaros
- Jon Flatabø (1846 in Kvam – 1930), a writer of popular literature
- Nils Nilsson Skaar (1852 in Kvam – 1948), a teacher, farmer, editor, and politician
- Ingebrigt Vik (1867 in Øystese – 1927), a distinguished sculptor
- Jakob Nilsson Vik (1882 in Kvam – 1960), a farmer, dairy manager, and politician
- Svein Rosseland (1894 in Kvam – 1985), an astrophysicist who pioneered theoretical astrophysics
- Geirr Tveitt (1908–1981), a composer and pianist who has family in Kvam
- Gunnar Aksnes (1926 in Kvam — 2010), a chemist and poet
- Magnus Midtbø (1942 in Ålvik – 2010), a trade unionist and politician
- Kaj Skagen (born 1949 in Strandebarm), a writer
- Nils Gunnar Lie (born 1950 in Øystese) a television personality
- Torill Selsvold Nyborg (born 1952 in Kvam) a nurse, missionary, and politician
- Valgerd Svarstad Haugland (born 1956 in Kvam), a teacher, politician, and civil servant
- Geir Botnen (born 1959 in Kvam), a pianist
- Gisle Torvik (born 1975 in Tørvikbygd), a jazz musician who plays guitar
- Torstein Lofthus (born 1977 in Øystese), a drummer and composer
- Frank Kjosås (born 1981 in Øystese), an actor of theatre and film

=== Sport ===
- Knut Hjeltnes (1951—2024), a college coach, shot-putter and discus thrower
- Kirsten Melkevik Otterbu (born 1970 in Øystese), a marathon runner
- Torgeir Børven (born 1991 in Øystese), a footballer with over 240 club caps
