= Fyksesund =

Fjord in Vestland, Norway

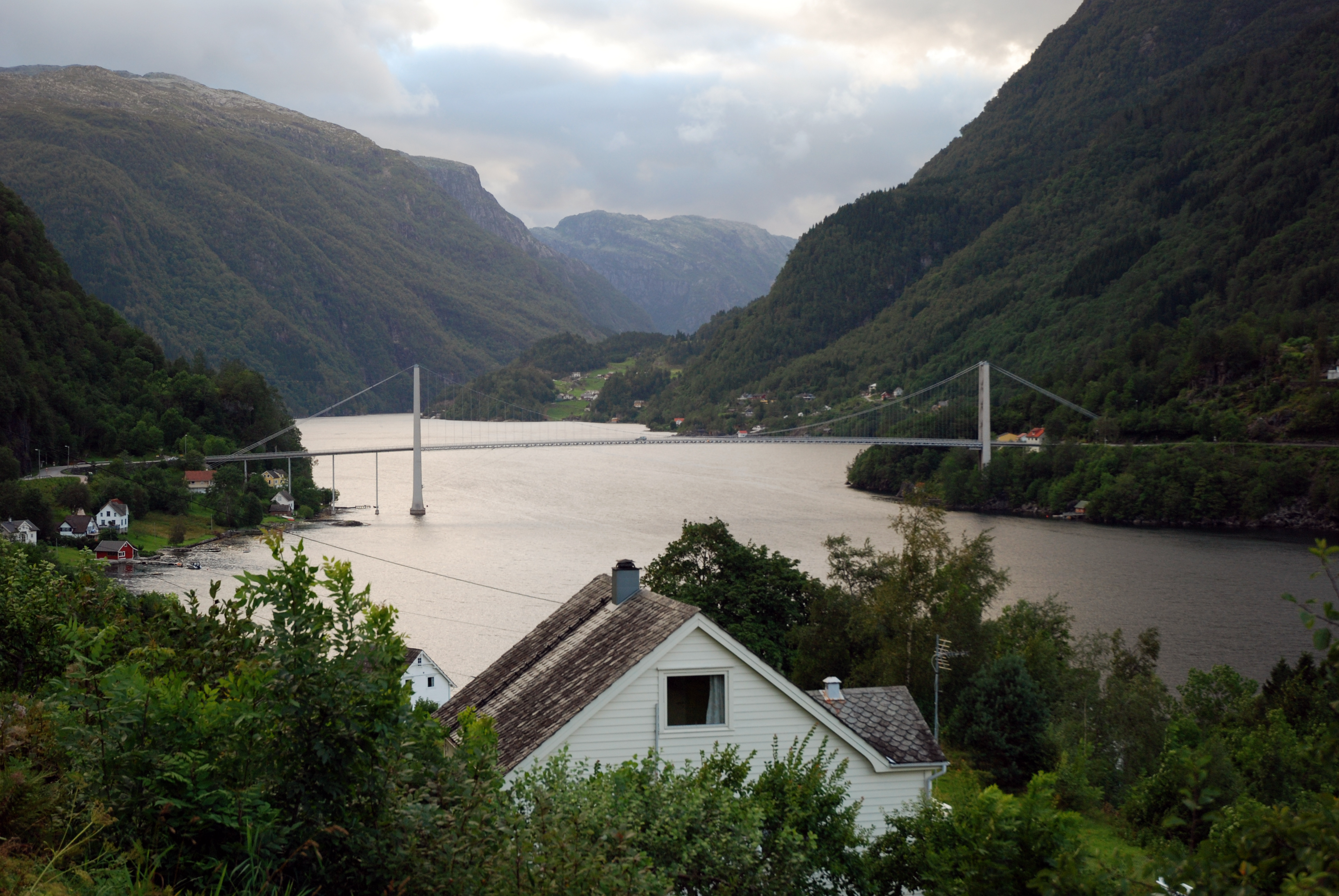
- View of the fjord and bridge
- Interactive map of Fyksesund
- Location: Vestland county, Norway
- Coordinates: 60.43534°N 6.23251°E
- Type: Fjord
- Primary outflows: Hardangerfjorden
- Basin countries: Norway
- Max. length: 11 kilometres (6.8 mi)

Fyksesund (lit. 'Fykse Sound') is a fjord in Kvam Municipality in Vestland county, Norway. The 11-kilometre (6.8 mi) long fjord is a branch off of the main Hardangerfjorden. It sits between the villages of Øystese and Ålvik, and it is surrounded by the Fyksesund Landscape Park. The fjord is spanned by the Fyksesund Bridge, which was opened by Crown Prince Olav in 1937.

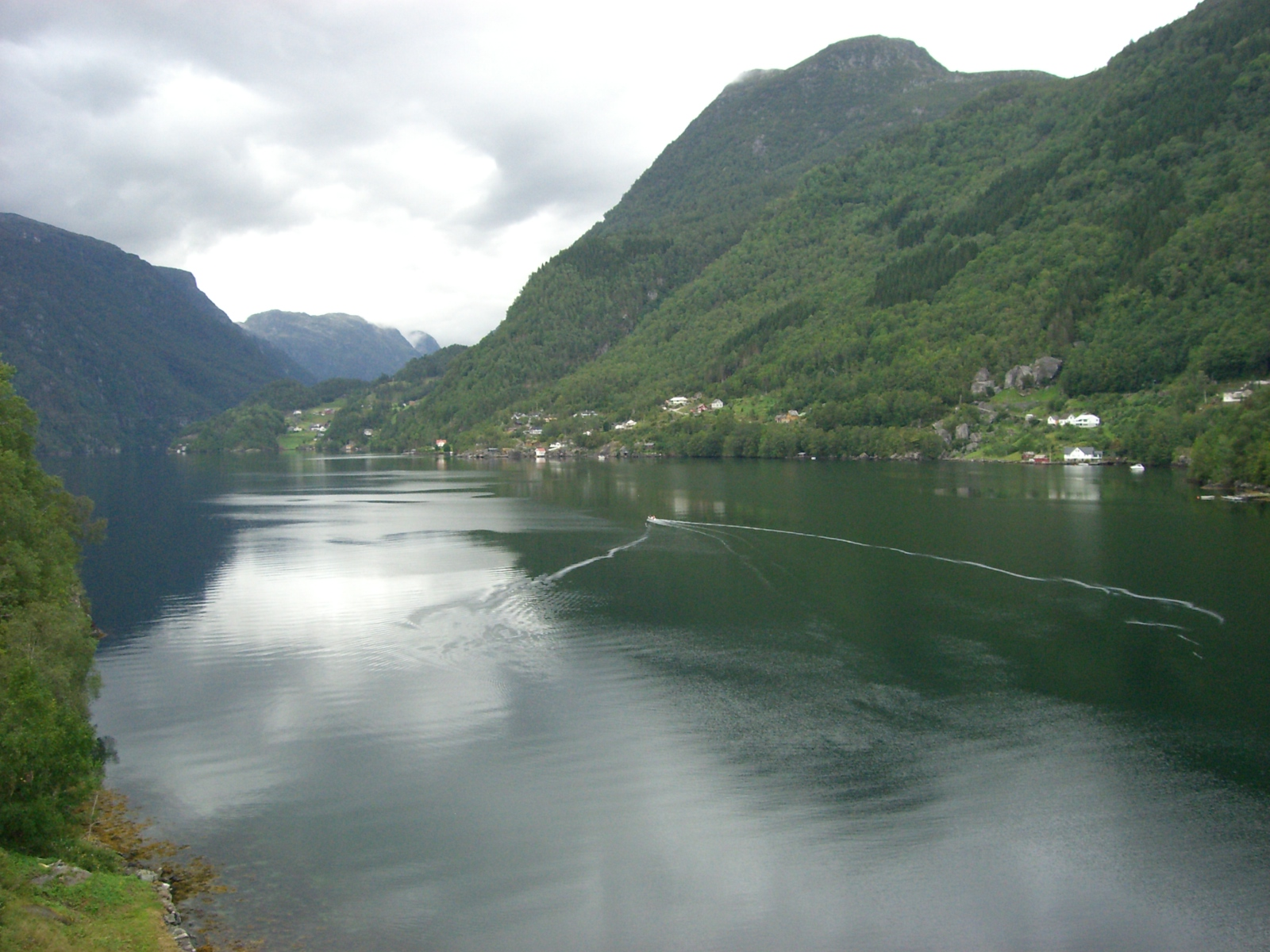
Fyksesund viewed from its Western bank

== See also ==
- List of Norwegian fjords
