= Norheimsund =

Village in Kvam Municipality, Norway

- Village
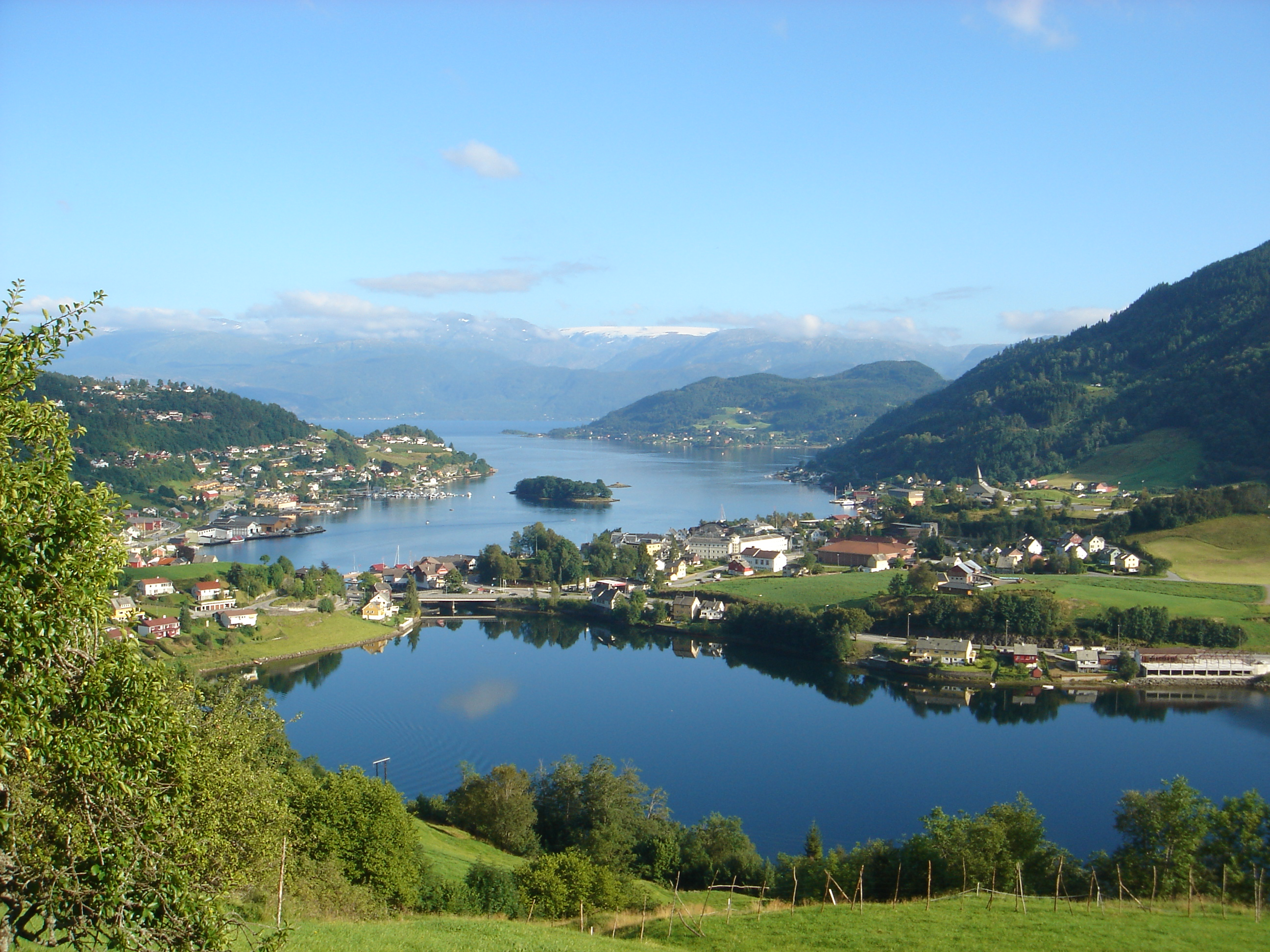
- View of the village
- Interactive map of Norheimsund
- Coordinates: 60.37089°N 6.14564°E
- Country: Norway
- Region: Western Norway
- County: Vestland
- District: Hardanger
- Municipality: Kvam Municipality

Area
  - Total: 1.98 km^{2} (0.76 sq mi)
- Elevation: 4 m (13 ft)

Population (2025)
  - Total: 2,366
  - Density: 1,195/km^{2} (3,100/sq mi)
- Time zone: UTC+01:00 (CET)
  - Summer (DST): UTC+02:00 (CEST)
- Post Code: 5600 Norheimsund

Norheimsund is the administrative centre of Kvam Municipality in Vestland county, Norway. The village is located on the northern side of the Hardangerfjord, about 80 kilometres (50 mi) from the city of Bergen. The village of Øystese lies about 4 kilometres (2.5 mi) to the northeast and the village of Vikøy lies about 3 kilometres (1.9 mi) southeast of Norheimsund. The village of Steine is a suburb, immediately to the west of Norheimsund.

The 1.98-square-kilometre (490-acre) village has a population (2025) of 2,366 and a population density of 1,195 inhabitants per square kilometre (3,100/sq mi).

Norheimsund has a lot of tourist traffic, especially in the summers. The waterfall Steinsdalsfossen (as of 2006 the 6th most visited natural tourist attraction in Norway) is located in Steine, just west of Norheimsund before the entrance to the Toka Gorge.

Norheimsund is the seat of municipal government and largest commercial center in the municipality with about 50 stores. There is also some industry in the village with factories, wood processing plants, and food processing plants. The newspaper Hordaland Folkeblad is published in Norheimsund. Norheimsund Church is located in the village. The Norheimsund Upper Secondary School is also located here. The waterfront area in Norheimsund has been redeveloped and beautified, and has won awards for development (in 2000) and for attractiveness (in 2013).

== History ==
The downtown center of Norheimsund was destroyed by a large fire on 7 October 1932. It was rebuilt with very functionalist-style architecture (rather than historic). During the Nazi occupation of Norway during World War II, the Germans had a large training camp at Norheimsund and large fortifications were built along the bay.
