= No. 6 Commando =

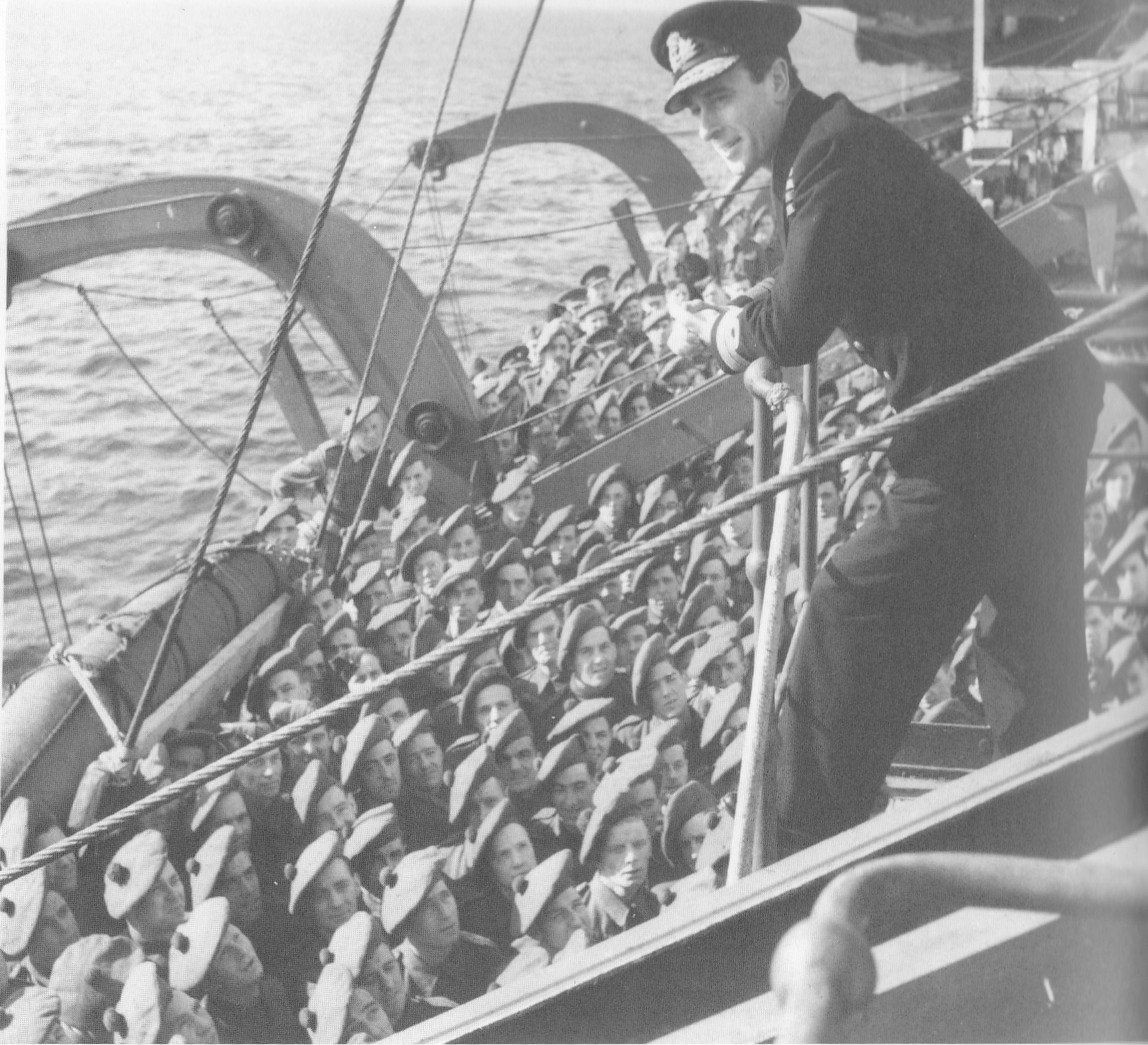
- Lord Louis Mountbatten addresses troops from No. 6 Commando prior to the Adour estuary raid, April 1942
- Active: 1940–1946
- Country: United Kingdom
- Branch: British Army
- Type: British Commando
- Role: Special Forces
- Size: 470–535 men all ranks
- Part of: 1st Special Service Brigade
- Engagements: Second World War: Operation Archery; Operation Myrmidon; Operation Bristle; Operation Torch; Operation Overlord; Operation Blackcock; Operation Plunder

Commanders
- Notable commanders: Derek Mills-Roberts

Insignia
- Combined Operations Shoulder Patch

No. 6 Commando was a battalion-sized British Army commando unit of the Second World War. Although it was raised to conduct small-scale raids and harass garrisons along the coast of German-occupied France, it was mainly employed as a highly trained infantry assault unit.

Formed in July 1940, No. 6 Commando's first involvement in operations came in late 1941 when it contributed small forces to raids in Norway. In April 1942 the whole unit was scheduled to take part in Operation Myrmidon, in France, but this raid was eventually cancelled. As a result, the first full-scale operation that No. 6 Commando took part in was Operation Torch, the Allied landings in Algeria in November 1942. Later, it joined the advance into Tunisia in 1943. On 6 June 1944, it participated in the D-Day landings in France as part of Operation Overlord, coming ashore with the 1st Special Service Brigade which was tasked with linking up with the troops from the 6th Airborne Division on the eastern flank of Sword.

Following this, No. 6 Commando were used in the defence of the beachhead and the subsequent operations to break out from Normandy before being withdrawn with the rest of the brigade back to the United Kingdom in September 1944. In January 1945, they took part in the Allied counterattack during the Ardennes Offensive before joining the advance into Germany as part of Operation Plunder. With the end of hostilities, the unit was disbanded in 1946.

== History ==
=== Formation ===
In early June 1940 following the lightning advance of the Germans through France and the subsequent Dunkirk evacuation, the British prime minister, Winston Churchill, realised the need for Britain to maintain some form of offensive action and directed his chief staff officer and military adviser, General Hastings Ismay, to begin organising a force which could conduct raids along the coast of German-occupied Europe. Shortly after this, even before the concept had been fully developed, the War Office put out a request for volunteers among the troops in Britain to join a force they would be known as the Commandos. At this stage it was decided to create 12 commando units, each with an establishment of roughly 500 men.

No. 6 Commando was one of the units formed at this time. Raised at Scarborough on 26 July 1940, it was placed under the command of Lieutenant Colonel Timothy Fetherstonhaugh, who was a Territorial officer holding the substantive rank of captain in the Queen’s Royal Regiment. Initially, the unit's personnel were mainly drawn from the British Army's Western Command although later personnel were drawn from all commands and branches of the army. Garrison duties were undertaken at Romney Marsh and Brightlingsea, before the unit moved to Milford Haven where they undertook amphibious training. Around this time, the commando adopted the Scottish tam o'shanter as their official headdress.

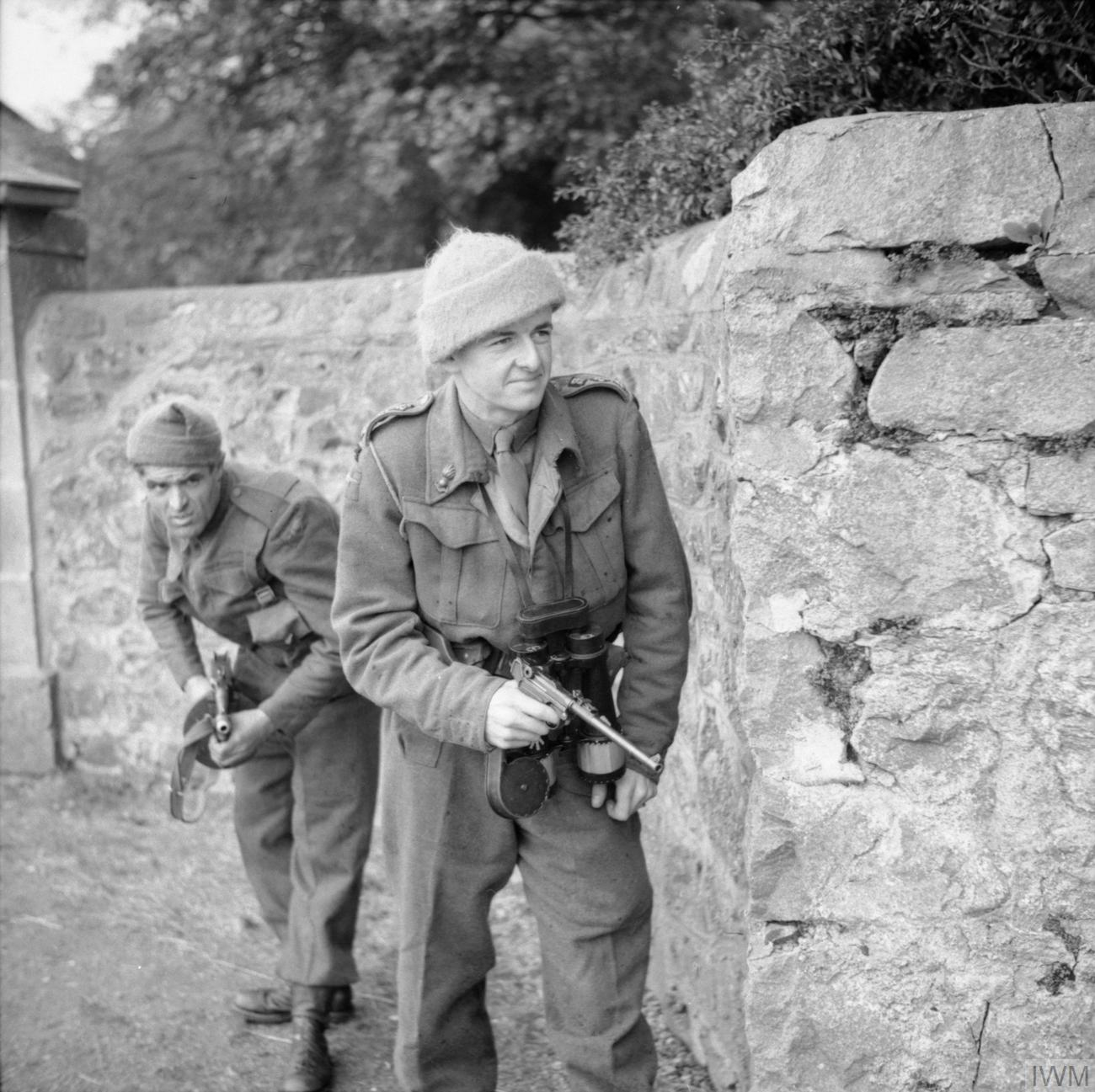
Men from 101 Troop, No. 6 Commando train around Inveraray, Scotland, October 1941

In October, when the commandos were reorganised into "Special Service" battalions underneath the overarching Special Service Brigade, No. 6 Commando was amalgamated with No. 5 Commando and became a company-sized element in the 5th Special Service Battalion under Fetherstonhaugh's command and based at Helensburgh in Scotland. In March 1941, following a reversal in War Office thinking, the battalion was broken up again into its constituent parts and No. 6 Commando was reorganised as a battalion equivalent unit, albeit with six troops instead of the original 10.

=== Early operations ===
Following the failures of the hastily planned commando operations undertaken in June and July 1940, there was a period of inactivity in which the concept was refined and detailed planning was undertaken while individual units carried out extensive and specialised training. In early 1941 a number of raids were undertaken but No. 6 Commando did not conduct its first operation until later in the year.

On 9 December 1941, No. 6 Commando, along with a detachment from No. 12 Commando and some Norwegian soldiers, took part in Operation Kitbag, a raid on the town of Florø in Norway. Embarking on HMS Prince Charles, an infantry landing ship, they set out from Scapa Flow. During the voyage an incident occurred while some of the men were priming grenades for the raid which resulted in six men being killed and another 11 seriously wounded. Nevertheless, the decision was made to continue with the raid, although it was eventually called off when the naval commander was unable to locate the fjord upon which Florø was located due to navigational difficulties.

Later in the month, on 27 December, No. 6 Commando provided a small detachment of engineers to support No. 3 Commando's raid on Vågsøy and Måløy in Norway as part of Operation Archery. The raid proved a resounding success; however, No. 6 Commando did not participate in another until April 1942 when it took part in Operation Myrmidon. This operation was an abortive raid on the Adour Estuary in southern France. The plan was to disrupt road and rail transport between France and Spain by landing approximately 3,000 troops, consisting of No. 1 and No. 6 Commandos. They would be followed up by one and a half Royal Marine battalions along with an armoured regiment and a motor battalion. After embarking on the transport ships HMS Queen Emma and HMS Princess Beatrix, the force spent a month sailing off the French coast disguised as Spanish merchant ships. On 5 April, the ships approached the mouth of the estuary in order to carry out the landing. Amidst bad weather they encountered a sandbar that they had not expected and, unable to pass it, the raid was called off and the ships returned to the United Kingdom.

=== Operation Torch ===
Because of these disappointments, No. 6 Commando's first major action as a formed unit came in November 1942 when, along with No. 1 Commando, it formed part of the spearhead for the Allied landings in Algeria as part of Operation Torch. Under the command of Lieutenant Colonel Iain McAlpine, the commando embarked upon HMT Awatea in October 1942 in Glasgow along with some United States Army Rangers that were also taking part in the operation. Tensions were high between the British and the Vichy French at this time because of a number of clashes and as a result the decision was made for the commandos to be equipped with American weapons and uniforms in an effort to placate the defenders.

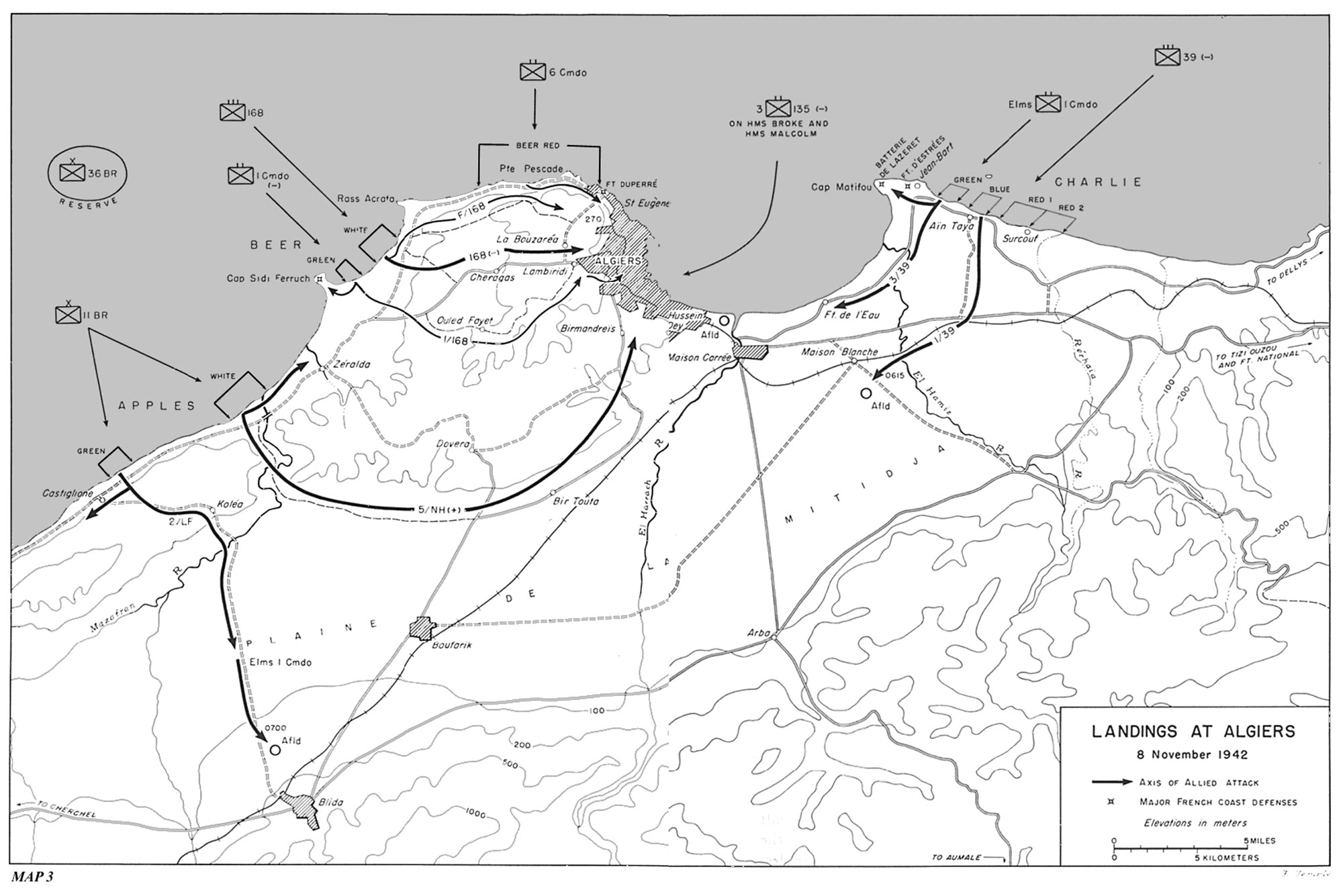
A map depicting the Allied landings that took place around Algiers on 8 November 1942

The voyage from the United Kingdom took approximately three weeks and on 7 November 1942 Awatea arrived at its assigned station off the coast near the harbour of Algiers. At 10:15 pm No. 6 Commando took to their landing craft. The launch did not go smoothly. From the outset they were hampered by the inexperience of the crews lowering the landing craft into the water and this, along with other factors that arose later including poor weather, breakdowns and navigational errors meant that the majority of No. 6 Commando's landing craft missed the rendezvous with the motor launch that was to guide them to the landing beaches. As a result, many landed at the wrong spot and the schedule was ruined. In the end the first landings took place at 3:00 am on 8 November, two hours later than planned, while the last wave came ashore in broad daylight at 6:30 am.

Nevertheless, in most places resistance was light and the first landings experienced only desultory artillery and machine gun fire from the defenders as they came ashore. Faulty navigation meant that No. 9 Troop attempted to land on the Ilot de la Marine, which was described by author Hilary Saint George Saunders as "the most heavily fortified part of Algiers harbour", and it was here that the majority of the commando's casualties for the day—two killed and 19 wounded—were suffered.

Once ashore the commando's first task was to secure four beaches between Cape Caxine and Ras Acrata for the main force. This was achieved with relative ease as the defenders surrendered almost immediately. After this part of the commando secured Pointe Pescarde, about 3 miles (4.8 km) from the town while another force, consisting of about three and a half troops under the second-in-command, Major Jock MacLeod of the Cameronians, moved on towards their main objective, which was to capture Fort Duperre, from where French artillery was firing upon the ships anchored offshore. MacLeod's men reached the fort with no trouble, but armed with only small arms, they were unable to capture it. At 1:30 pm, after the forward observer, a captain from the Royal Canadian Artillery directed an air strike on the fort from a number of Fleet Air Arm fighter-bombers, a dialogue was opened between the attackers and the defenders and after threats of a naval bombardment were made the fort’s garrison finally surrendered.

=== Further operations in North Africa ===
After capturing Fort Duperre, the commandos received reports that a force of some 2,000 Zouaves were moving up to recapture the position. The French attack did not eventuate, however, and in the end the commandos marched all the way to Maison Blanche. Having only been issued with rations for a day, they had to rely on fruit and bread that they obtained by bartering with the locals on the way. Eventually they arrived at the port, where they embarked upon the destroyers HMS Wheatland and Lamerton and in company with a force of US Rangers they set out to capture the airfields at Allerlick and Duzzerville, near Bone.

Upon arrival No. 6 Commando took up defensive positions in the orange groves alongside troops from the 3rd Battalion, The Parachute Regiment, the Royal West Kents and a number of Frenchmen that decided to join their cause. A brief period of lull followed where the commandos were mainly involved in defending the airfield against air attacks from the Luftwaffe, before they moved off again to take part in the fighting around Medjez-el-Bab, where they fought on the left flank of the first French regular forces to engage the Germans since the fall of France in 1940, forming the spearhead of the advance towards Tunis.

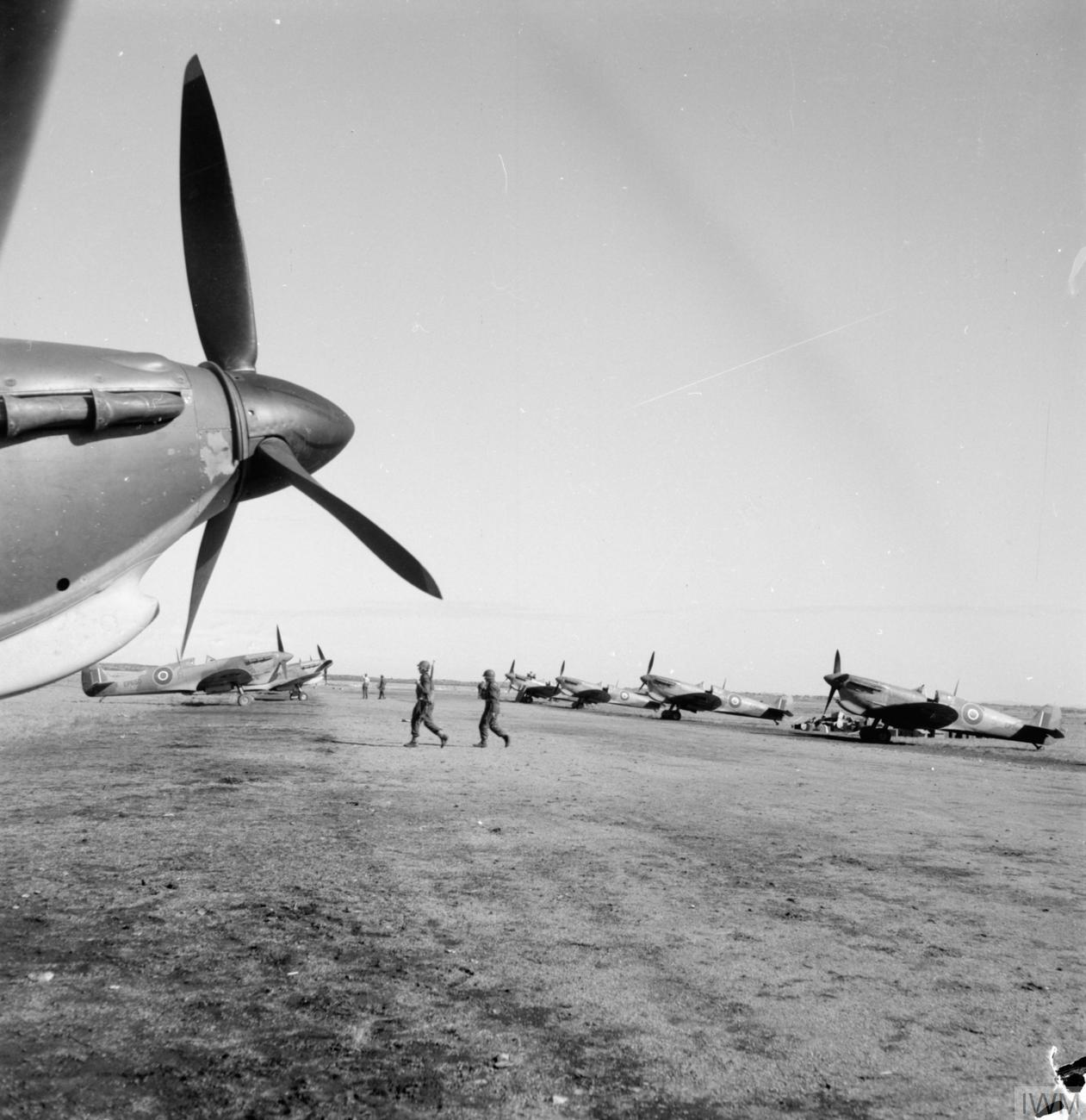
Supermarine Spitfire Mark Vs, reinforcement aircraft for North African units, lined up at Bone airfield, Algeria.

On 21 November, reinforcements had reached them and the decision was made to move the commandos to La Calle by rail. With only intermittent air cover, the train was attacked by German fighters and No. 6 Commando suffered heavy casualties with 11 killed and 32 wounded. After the train driver jumped from the engine, one of the commandos took over the duties of driving the train. The unit remained in La Calle until 26 November, during which time the commandos were used to unload stores from the ships in the port, while half the unit carried out a reconnaissance patrol near Tabarka, to determine whether the German tanks that were parked there were real or decoys.

Following this the commandos were used mainly as highly trained infantry units for the rest of their involvement in the North African campaign and for the majority of this time they were attached to the 36th Infantry Brigade. Over the course of the next five months the commandos were involved in a number of costly attacks and periods of static defence, in between which they carried out aggressive fighting patrols. Indicative of the nature of the fighting during this time was No. 6 Commando's attack on the Green Hill feature on 30 November 1942. The main attack was launched at 4:00 am, as three troops—Nos. 3, 4 and 6 Troops—attacked from the north and west, while No. 5 Troop conducted a diversionary attack from the flank. As soon as the main force left its line of departure it came under intense oblique fire from interlocking medium and heavy machine guns positioned in a diamond-shaped perimeter on top of the hill. The fire was so intense that the troop providing support by fire on the flank was unable to suppress it and the attack was temporarily postponed until the afternoon when it was hoped that artillery support could be utilised.

At 4:00 pm, following a period of artillery preparation, the commandos launched their attack. Amidst thick mist and heavy rain, the attack went badly from the start. Shortly after stepping off, No. 5 Troop was ambushed by a German force disguised as locals, reducing its strength to just five men. The main assault force pressed on, although by now it consisted of only 67 men due to earlier losses. Part of the assault force—No. 6 Troop—took heavy fire and lost forward momentum; however, the other two troops gained the top of the hill and broke in to the German position. Upon reaching the summit they were greeted by an intense volume of heavy machine gun fire and at this point it became clear that the preparatory bombardment had not been successful. Calls for further artillery support were denied due to a shortage of ammunition amongst the field batteries and eventually after a number of unsuccessful attempts at taking the position the commandos were forced to retire.

The commando's losses on Green Hill amounted to 80 men killed or wounded and as a result No. 6 Commando had to be reorganised into four troops instead of the six that its establishment called for. Shortly after this the unit suffered another blow when its commanding officer, Iain McAlpine, suffered heart trouble and had to be evacuated to hospital. In his place Major Jock MacLeod temporarily took over command.

In early January 1943, Lieutenant Colonel Derek Mills-Roberts arrived from the United Kingdom to take over the unit, and he was in command when on 26 February 1943 they were involved in bitter fighting against two battalions of German parachute infantry with armoured support which attacked their position as part of an attempt to encircle the 1st Army by cutting the Medjez road. In a fight that lasted over five hours, against an enemy that outnumbered them and had the advantage of heavy armoured support, the commandos, along with elements from the Reconnaissance Regiment, were able to stop the advance long enough for reinforcements to be brought up. In this action, No. 6 Commando incurred 11 killed, 34 wounded and 55 missing in action. This represented over 40 per cent of the unit's strength at the time, although later a number of those that were captured were recovered after the Germans withdrew.

After this, No. 6 Commando was put into the role of mobile reserve in an effort to maintain the unit's integrity and spare it from incurring further losses that might render it unable to remain in the line. Nevertheless, throughout March and into April they continued to carry out patrol operations around Goubellat and Ben Arada. Finally, in early April the decision was made to withdraw the commandos from the fighting in North Africa. Lacking the administrative support and reinforcements of regular infantry units, the unit's strength had fallen to just 150 men and as a result it was no longer considered effective. On 7 April, No. 6 Commando arrived in Algiers, where it remained for two weeks before embarking on HMT Staffordshire on 24 April. After a short voyage, it arrived back in the United Kingdom on 2 May 1943 to begin preparations for the invasion of German-occupied France.

=== D-Day and beyond ===
After returning from North Africa, No. 6 Commando became part of the 1st Special Service Brigade, commanded by Brigadier The Lord Lovat. The grouping of the commandos into brigades underneath the divisional-sized Special Service Group headquarters was part of the general reorganisation that took place in late 1943 as the evolution of their role from raiding to assault infantry was formalised. This saw a change in the individual unit establishments, with the addition of organic transport assets, as well as an increase in the allocation of indirect and direct fire support weapons at commando level. Further support units were added at brigade level, including administration, transport, logistics and signals.

On D-Day, the 1st Special Service Brigade was tasked with landing behind the 8th Infantry Brigade, capturing the port of Ouistreham and linking up with the 6th Airborne Division on the eastern flank of Sword, where they were holding the high ground near La Plein and the bridges over the River Orne and Caen Canal. No. 6 Commando, with Lovat's brigade headquarters, came ashore on Queen Red beach of the Sword landing area, near La Breche, at 8:40 am on 6 June 1944.

No. 6 Commando led the brigade from the beach. Moving through a swamp that briefly slowed their progress, the commandos began to come up against the German defences that had not been destroyed by the naval bombardment. Where possible they attempted an indirect approach, penetrating the defences using infiltration tactics. However, as they advanced towards bridges that had been captured by the paratroopers earlier in the day, they assaulted four pillboxes as well as an artillery battery that had been firing on the landing beaches.

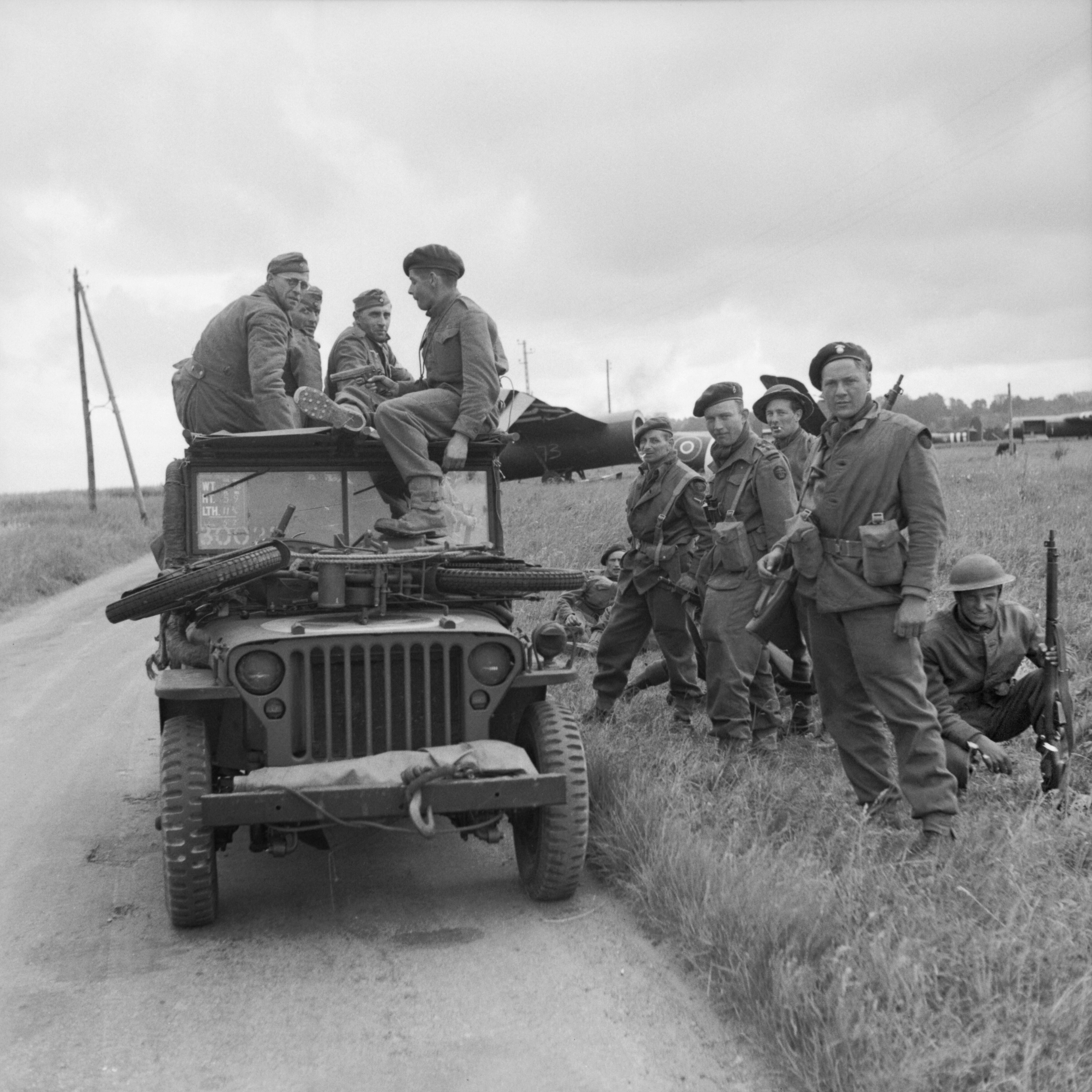
Commandos from the 1st Special Service Brigade with captured German soldiers near Ranville on 7 June 1944

In the end it took the commando three-and-a-half hours to advance the 6.5 miles (10.5 km) to the bridges, with the lead elements, mounted on bicycles, linking up with gliderborne troops from D Company, 2nd Battalion, Oxford and Buckinghamshire Light Infantry under Major John Howard. After effecting the link up, the commandos joined with paratroops from the 9th Battalion, The Parachute Regiment in an attack on the village of La Plein, before digging in to begin defending against possible counterattack. By the end of the day, No. 6 Commando had suffered three killed and 32 wounded.

In the week that followed the brigade undertook defensive duties as the Germans attempted to apply pressure on the beachhead by infiltrating the defensive positions on the eastern flank. On 12 June, the airborne troops launched an attack on the village of Breville from where German artillery had been shelling them during the preceding week. Although successful, British casualties were high. Having been subjected to an intense artillery barrage, No. 6 Commando suffered 16 casualties. The barrage also wounded the brigade commander, Lord Lovat, to the extent that No. 6 Commando's commanding officer, Mills-Roberts, although wounded himself, was asked to take over from him. Major Anthony Lewis, formerly of the Dorset Regiment, stepped up to take over as commanding officer temporarily, before being confirmed in the role on 24 June and receiving a promotion to acting-lieutenant colonel. He remained in command until 8 August 1944, when Lieutenant Colonel Charles Courtney-Coade of the South Staffordshire Regiment took over, and Lewis reverted to the role of second-in-command.

Although they had initially been told that they would be withdrawn from the front within 48 hours, the strategic situation called that they remained at the front holding the ground on the eastern flank. In late July a breakout from the beachhead was attempted and the 1st Special Service Brigade moved through the Le Bois de Bavent, a large wooded area, as the Germans began to withdraw. Nevertheless, little progress was made, and, after a brief move which saw No. 6 Commando advance to Bavent, they went on the defensive again.

On 18 August, a general advance began and the following morning No. 6 Commando took part in an attack to seize an area of high ground to the east of the Dives, north of Dozule. The attack took place under the cover of darkness and the lead elements were able to infiltrate deep into the German positions before they were detected. By daybreak the position had been captured and over the course of the day four determined counter-attacks were repelled. In one attack, a troop from No. 6 Commando rushed their attackers, killing the senior German officer and capturing 25 prisoners as the attack was broken up.

Over the next five days, the brigade advanced a further 40 miles (64 km) before a halt was finally called on 26 August 1944. On 7 September, No. 6 Commando, along with the rest of the 1st Special Service Brigade, were withdrawn from the line and returned to the United Kingdom to prepare to be redeployed to India for operations against the Japanese in Burma. They had been in action continuously for 83 days.

=== Ardennes offensive and the crossing of the Rhine ===
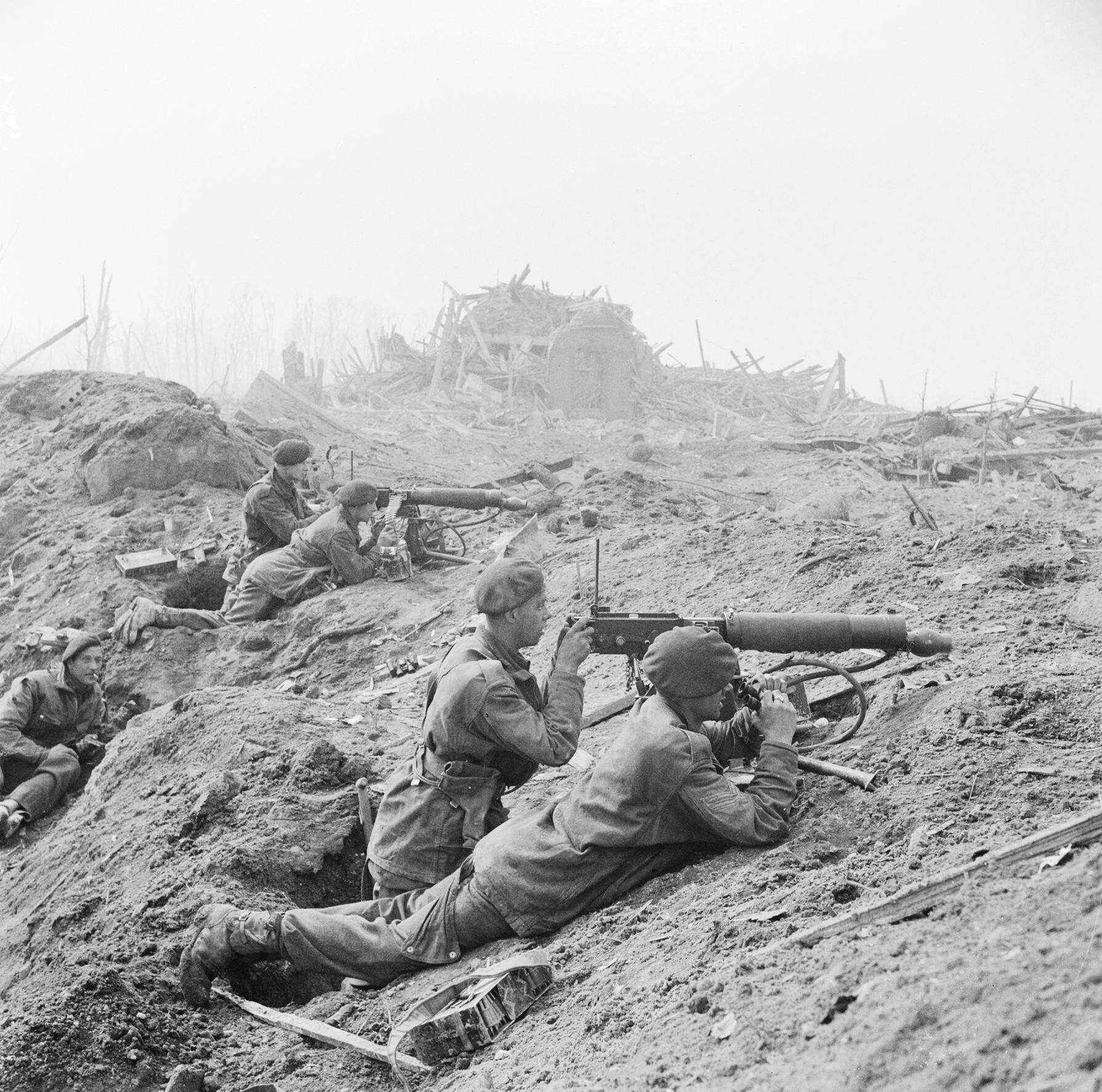
Men from the 1st Commando Brigade fight on the outskirts of Wesel 1945.

It had been planned to send the brigade—which had been renamed the 1st Commando Brigade in late 1944—to India, however, the effect of the German Ardennes Offensive prevented this and in January 1945, still under the command of Brigadier Derek Mills-Roberts, they crossed the English Channel by sea and landed in the Netherlands from where they were deployed to Asten on the Maas. By the time they arrived the German advance had been largely halted and it was not until 23 January that the brigade was engaged in any large-scale operations. Under the command of Lieutenant Colonel Anthony Lewis, that night No. 6 Commando joined Operation Blackcock. Lewis had taken over from Courtenay-Coade after the latter had experienced complications from the head injury he had suffered in France earlier. As part of Blackcock, the unit advanced over the ice-covered Juliana Canal and took up positions at Maasbracht, in support of No. 45 (Royal Marine) Commando's advance on St. Joostburg.

The following day, after the Royal Marines had met stiff resistance, No. 6 Commando attempted to advance from its position in an effort to relieve the pressure on them. This attack was well supported by artillery and a squadron of armour from the 8th Hussars, nevertheless, the commandos were stopped near an orchard close to the crossroads by a hastily formed, but well-led, force consisting of Luftwaffe aircrew and Fallschirmjäger. As the rest of the brigade advanced towards the town of Linne, attempts to cross the Montforterbeek Canal were frustrated by the defenders who managed to destroy all the bridges that crossed it. The ice over the canal was not thick enough to support the crossing of armour, so temporary bridges were brought up and erected by members of the Royal Engineers. Finally, after a number of attempts at forcing a crossing, an assault force from No. 3 Commando managed to enter Linne.

After this the commandos came up against part of the Siegfried Line defences around Roermond. A short halt followed and during this time No. 6 Commando sent out a number of patrols mounted on the tanks of the 8th Hussars. In February, the snow thawed and the ground turned to mud which rendered the tanks useless and as a result the commandos carried out their patrols on foot.

In early March, No. 6 Commando moved with the rest of the 1st Commando Brigade to Venray where they carried out rehearsals for Operation Plunder, the crossing of the Rhine. Over the course of two weeks training was undertaken at a creek near Wansum and on 23 March 1945 the assault took place, with the objective being the capture of the town of Wesel. No. 6 Commando went across in the second wave on board storm-boats crewed by engineers. They came under fire almost immediately and as a result of this, and several mechanical failures, a number of boats were sunk before they reached the landing site at Grav Islet, where the lead unit, No. 46 (Royal Marine) Commando had established a bridgehead. Ultimately the majority of the commandos made it to the form up point and No. 6 Commando passed through the marines' positions to lead the advance into the town from the north-east, marking the route as they went with white tape. Over the course of the next two days the commandos took control of the town and repelled a number of German counterattacks, before Wesel finally fell late on 25 March.

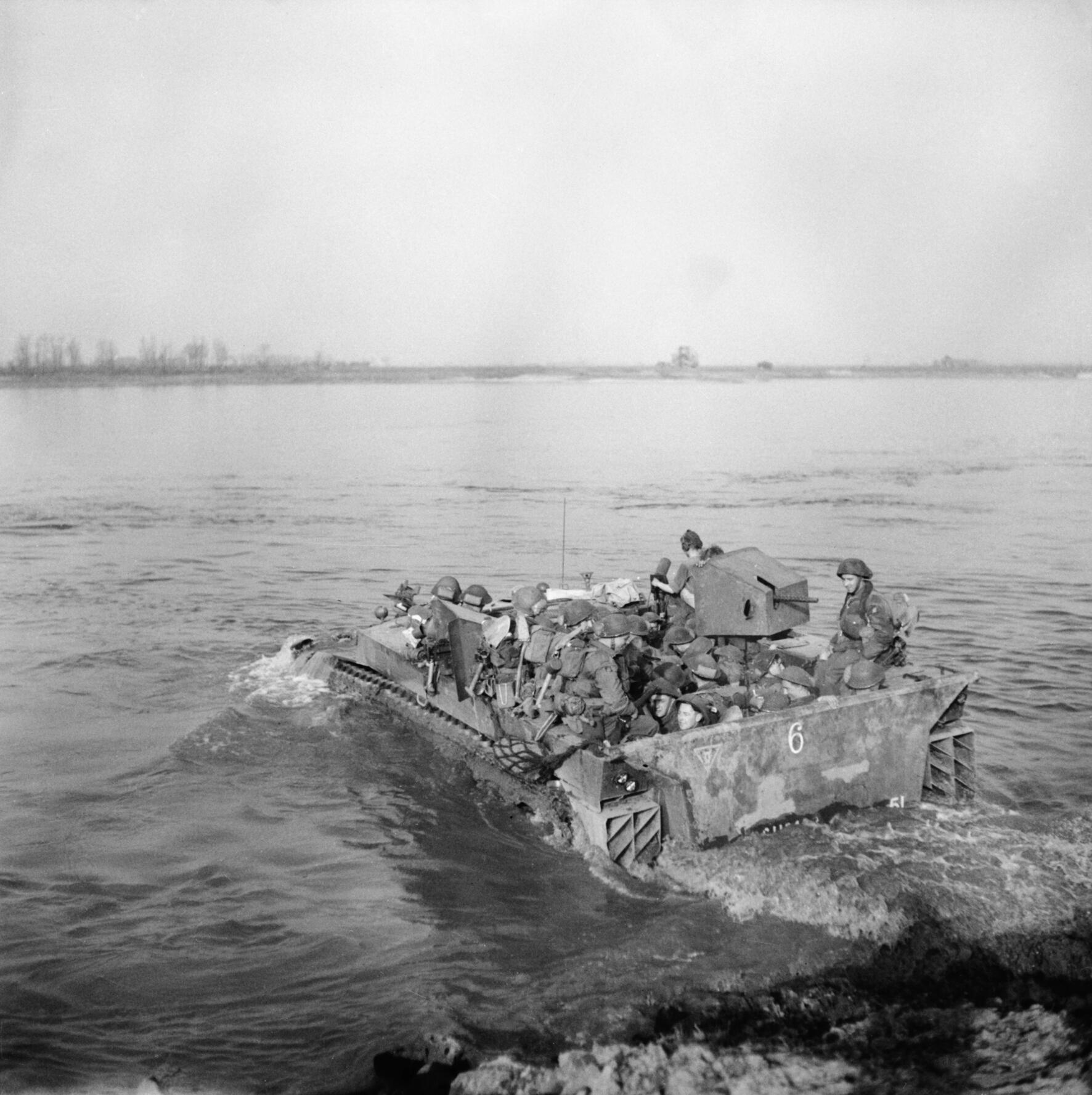
A Buffalo landing vehicle, such as those used by 1st Commando Brigade, crosses the Rhine during Operation Plunder

After this the brigade continued to advance, moving through Ruddenburg and Greven before carrying out an attack on Osnabruck on 4 April 1945. On the night of 7/8 April they crossed the Weser River in assault boats and under the cover of darkness carried out a flanking manoeuvre on the Germans occupying the town of Leese, catching them by surprise.

Their next task was the capture of the road bridge spanning the Aller river as part of the 11th Armoured Division's advance on the town of Essel. The 1st Commando Brigade carried out a preliminary move across the river over a railway bridge some distance away from their objective and after forcing their way across, they removed the explosives that had been placed on the bridge and dug in on the other side. Over the course of about three-and-a-half hours they repelled a number of determined counterattacks, before No. 6 Commando, supported by Vickers machine guns fixed bayonets and charged the German marines that were defending the bridge, and inflicting heavy casualties upon them.

With the bridge having been captured other elements of the brigade established a bridgehead for the advancing 11th Armoured and on 19 April they arrived in Lüneburg, where they began to prepare for the crossing of the Elbe. The assault began at 2:00 am on 29 April with No. 6 Commando leading the way across in Buffalo landing vehicles. Under fire the entire way, they landed downstream from the objective—Lauenburg—and launched an assault against the defenders who were perched on a cliff overlooking the narrow landing beach. After reaching the top of the cliff, they broke through the defences and established themselves to the north of the town, while the rest of the brigade came up. Throughout the remainder of the day, the town was cleared and patrols sent out; a patrol from No. 6 Commando captured the Elbe–Trave Canal bridge, arriving just as the demolition party was preparing it for detonation.

Resistance in Lauenburg ceased on 30 April 1945 and during the beginning of May the 1st Commando Brigade advanced towards the Baltic Sea, which they reached at Neustadt. A few days later Germany surrendered and No. 6 Commando's war service came to an end.

=== Disbandment ===
Following the end of hostilities, No. 6 Commando remained in Germany to undertake various occupation duties along with the rest of the 1st Commando Brigade. These duties included searching for German personnel and officials that were wanted for questioning or to be tried for war crimes, distributing food to the populace and helping to restore law and order as part of the reconstruction process. In early 1946, the unit returned to the United Kingdom and it was eventually disbanded. At this time the decision was made to disband all the Army commando units and demobilise or return their personnel to their original regiments or branches of service. Consequently, the commando role was maintained solely by the Royal Marines Commandos, although they too were subjected to cut backs, being reduced from eight wartime units to just three.

== Commanding officers ==
- Lieutenant Colonel Timothy Fetherstonhaugh: 26 July 1940 – 1 March 1942
- Lieutenant Colonel Thomas Trevor: 1 March 1942 – 24 May 1942
- Lieutenant Colonel Iain MacAlpine: 24 May 1942 – 4 December 1942
- Major Jock MacLeod: 4 December 1942 – 16 January 1943
- Lieutenant Colonel Derek Mills-Roberts: 16 January 1943 – 12 June 1944
- Lieutenant Colonel Anthony Lewis: 12 June 1944 – 8 August 1944
- Lieutenant Colonel Charles Courtenay-Coade: 8 August 1944 – 8 January 1945
- Lieutenant Colonel Anthony Lewis: 8 January 1945 – January 1946.

== Battle honours ==
The following battle honours were awarded to the British Commandos during the Second World War:

- Adriatic
- Alethangyaw
- Aller
- Anzio
- Argenta Gap
- Burma 1943–45
- Crete
- Dieppe
- Dives Crossing
- Djebel Choucha
- Flushing
- Greece 1944–45
- Italy 1943–45
- Kangaw
- Landing at Porto San Venere
- Landing in Sicily
- Leese
- Litani
- Madagascar
- Middle East 1941, 1942, 1944
- Monte Ornito
- Myebon
- Normandy Landing
- North Africa 1941–43
- North-West Europe 1942, 1944–1945
- Norway 1941
- Pursuit to Messina
- Rhine
- St. Nazaire
- Salerno
- Sedjenane 1
- Sicily 1943
- Steamroller Farm
- Syria 1941
- Termoli
- Vaagso
- Valli di Comacchio
- Westkapelle
