= 1st Special Service Brigade =

1st Special Service Brigade 1st Commando Brigade
- Active: 1941–1946
- Country: United Kingdom
- Branch: British Army
- Type: Commando
- Size: Brigade
- Engagements: Operation Ambassador; Operation Archery; Operation Claymore; Operation Jubilee; Operation Overlord; Operation Plunder

Commanders
- Notable commanders: Brigadier The Lord Lovat; Brigadier Derek Mills-Roberts

Insignia
- Combined Operations Shoulder Patch

The 1st Special Service Brigade was a commando brigade of the British Army. Formed during the Second World War, it consisted of Army Commandos and Royal Marines Commandos. The brigade's component units saw action individually in Norway and the Dieppe Raid (in France), before being combined under one commander for service in Normandy during Operation Overlord. On 6 December 1944, the Brigade was redesignated 1st Commando Brigade, removing the title Special Service and its association with the German SS.

== History ==
Recruiting for the Commandos began in 1940 when a call was made for volunteers from certain formations that were still in Britain at the time. It was also decided that the Divisional Independent Companies that had been originally raised from Territorial Army Divisions would be disbanded and used to raise the new Commando units along with other men who had seen service in Norway and elsewhere. Subsequent recruiting for the Commandos was also conducted in the various theatres of war and among foreign nationals joining the Allies.

Initially, each 'Commando' was to consist of a headquarters plus ten troops of 50 men each, including three officers; this changed in 1941 to six troops of 65 men per Commando, including a Heavy Weapons Troop. Each Commando unit was initially responsible for the selection and training of its own officers and men. Commando soldiers received extra pay from which they had to find their own accommodation whenever they were in Britain. They trained in amphibious and cliff assault, artillery observer, CQB/CQC, cold-weather warfare, combat and patrolling techniques in urban areas, commando style raids, counter-ambushes, demolition, gathering field intelligence, infiltrating, learning about the toxic environment from chemical weapons to protect when operations, marksmanship, motor vehicle operations, mountain warfare, orienteering, physical fitness, reconnaissance tactics, SERE, signalling, silent killing, tactical emergency medical, tracking tactics, use a map and compass, and weapons (including the use of captured enemy small-arms). Many officers, NCOs and trainee instructors initially attended various courses at the all forces Special Training Centre at Lochailort in Scotland. Also in the Scottish Highlands, Combined Operations established a substantial all forces amphibious training centre at Inveraray, and in 1942 a specific Commando Training Centre at Achnacarry near Spean Bridge. All field training was conducted with live ammunition.

== Commanders ==
- Brigadier The Lord Lovat, DSO, MC (wounded 12 June 1944)
- Brigadier Derek Mills-Roberts (from 12 June 1944)
- Brigadier Peter Young (from May 1945)

== Formation ==
- No. 3 Commando
- No. 4 Commando (Until September 1944)
- No. 6 Commando
- No.45 Commando (RM)
- No.46 Commando (RM) (From September 1944)
- No. 10 (Inter-Allied) Commando

== Independent actions ==
Before the formation of the brigade, each Commando fought independently in various actions, being employed as directed by Combined Operations Headquarters.

- No 4 Special Service Battalion was formed from Nos 3 and 8 Independent Companies in November 1940 and saw their first action in Guernsey during Operation Ambassador. At the end of February 1941 they were designated No 3 Commando.
- No. 3 Special Service Battalion was formed from Nos 4 and 7 Independent Companies in late October 1940. In February 1941 they were named No 4 Commando.
- No 6 Commando saw action in Norway in December 1941.
- Nos 3 and 4 Commando were involved in the raid on the Lofoten Islands in Norway in March 1941.

=== Operation Claymore ===
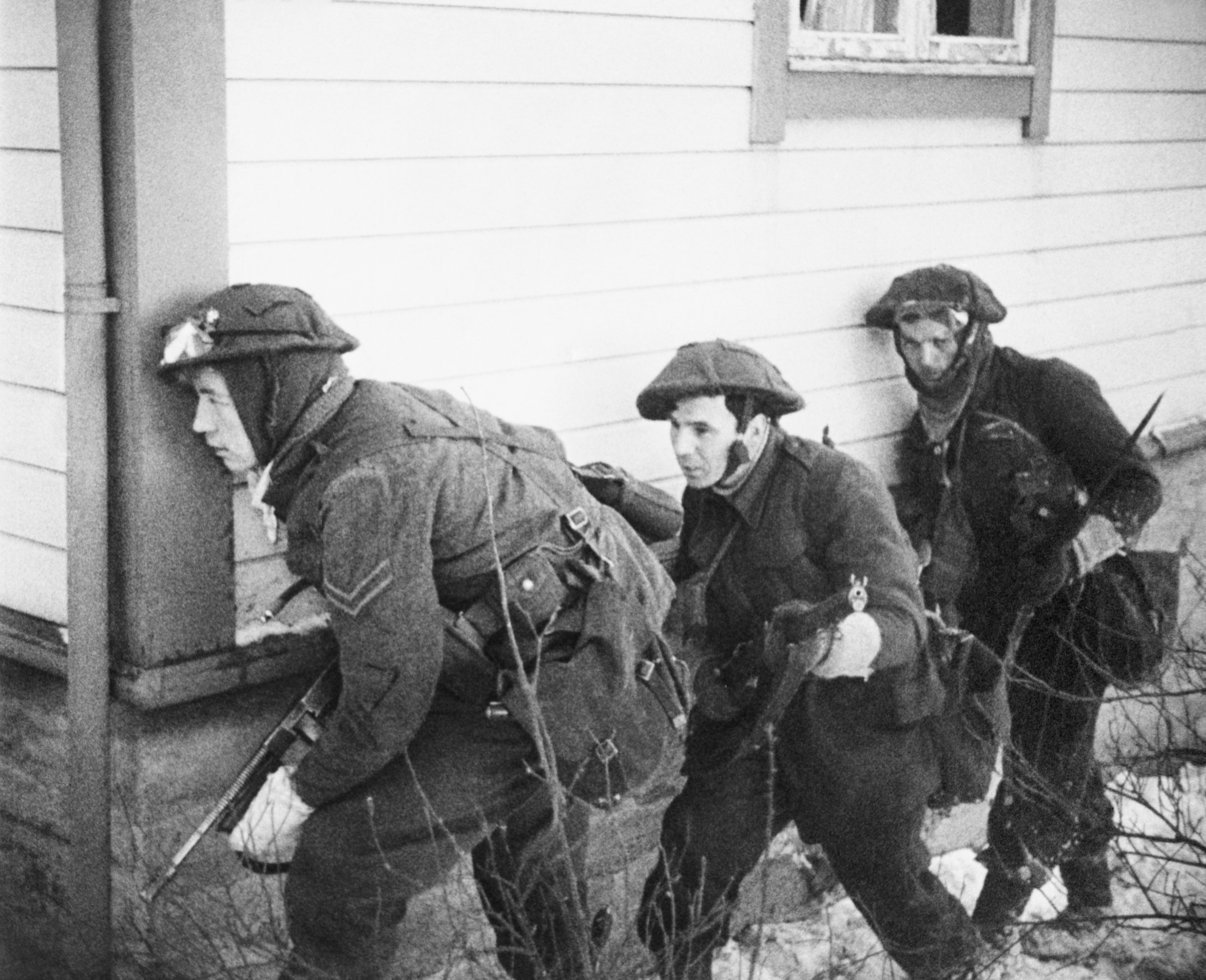
Commandos in action in Norway.

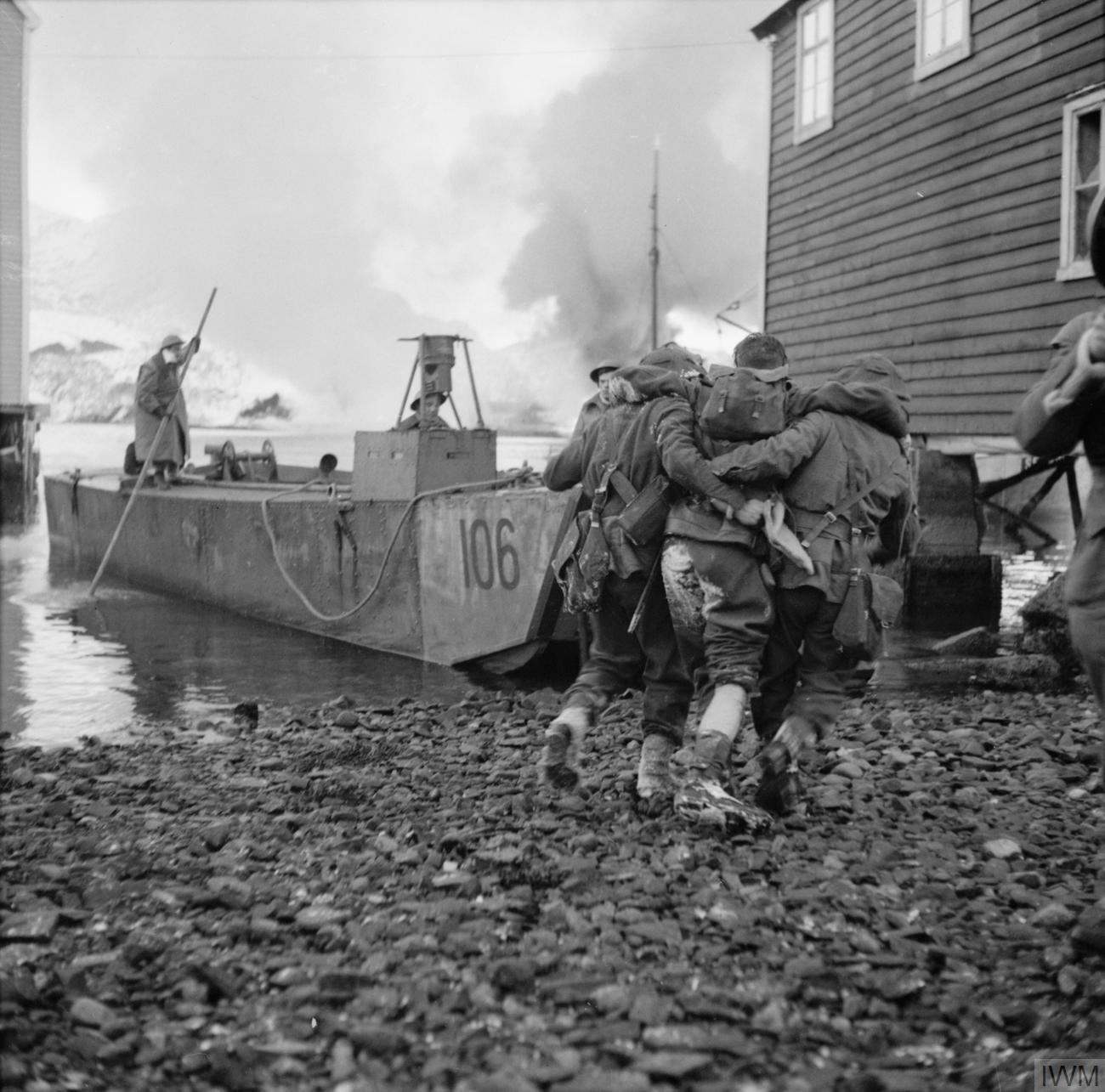
A wounded soldier is helped onto an LCA.

Operation Claymore was a raid on the Lofoten Islands, on the 4 March 1941, by Nos 3 and 4 Commando, 52 Norwegians of Norwegian Independent Company 1 and demolition teams from 55 Field Squadron, Royal Engineers. The force made an unopposed landing and generally continued to meet no opposition. They achieved their objective of destroying fish-oil factories and some 3,600 tonnes (800,000 gallons) of oil and glycerine (some of the oil being destined for use in munitions) Through naval gunfire and demolition parties, 18,000 tons of shipping was sunk. Perhaps the most significant outcome of the raid, however, was the capture of a set of rotor wheels for an Enigma cypher machine and its code books from Nazi Germany's armed trawler Krebs. This enabled German naval codes to be read at Bletchley Park, providing the intelligence needed to allow allied convoys to avoid U-boat concentrations. The British experienced only one accidental injury and returned with some 228 German prisoners, 314 loyal Norwegian volunteers and a number of Quisling collaborators.

=== Operation Archery ===
Operation Archery was a raid in December 1941 by Nos 2, 3, 4 and 6 Commando with a small party of Norwegians. Its aim was to destroy the German installations at Vågsøy, supported by the RAF who provided air cover and attacked the airfield at Herdla near Bergen. The naval part of the force consisted of one cruiser, four destroyers and two landing ships; the warships began the operation with a shore bombardment of Måløy island. The commandos were split into five groups, one landed to the west of South Vågsøy to secure the area and then moved up to the town. The second group landed to the north of the town to prevent German reinforcements getting in. The third group landed on Måløy to deal with the guns and garrison there, but the Navy had done their job well, the guns were silent. The fourth group landed in the town itself, which proved to be the main centre of resistance, the last group was kept on board ship to act as a floating reserve.

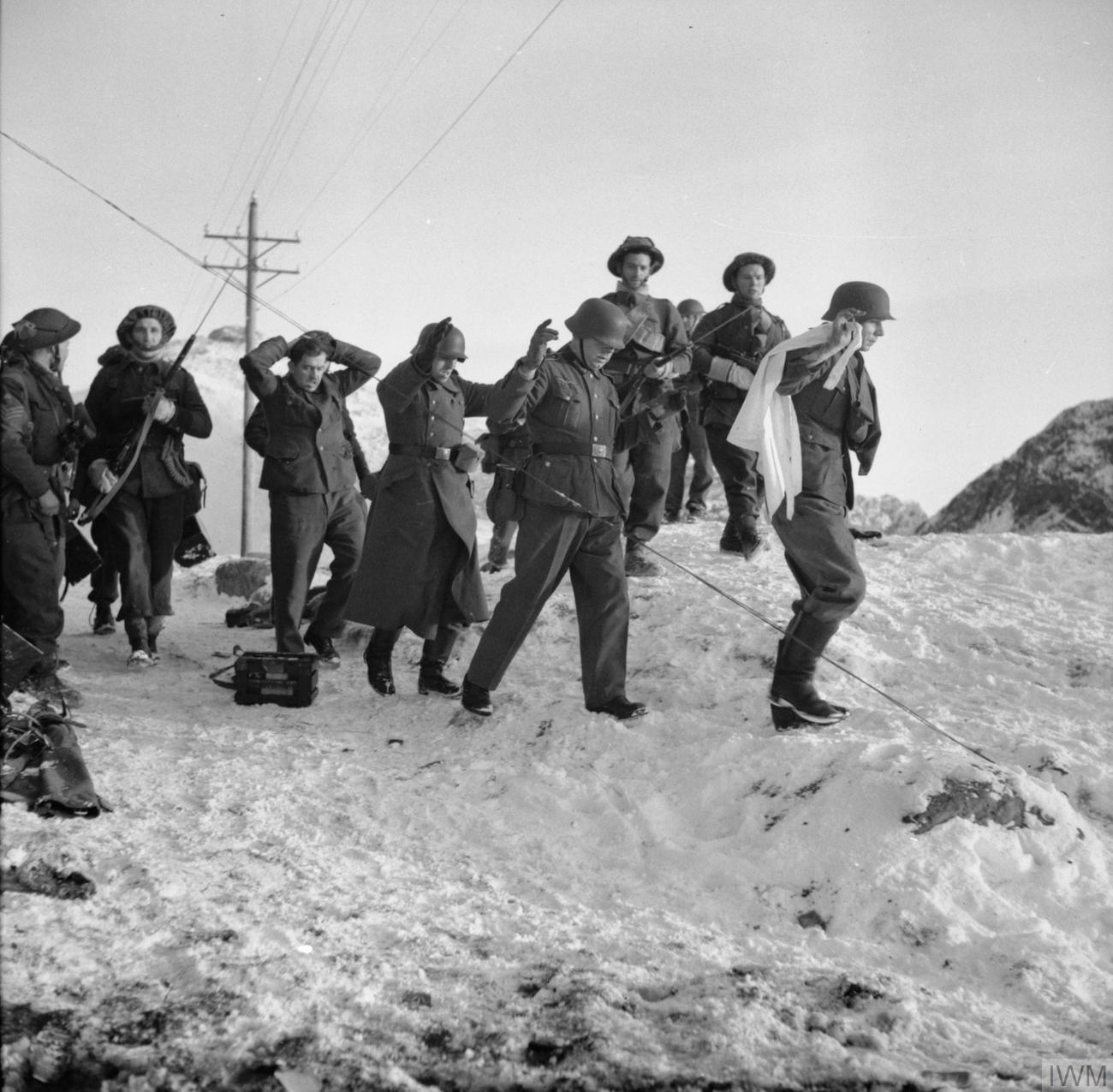
Operation Archery.

The German garrison in the town was larger than expected and reinforcements had to be requested from the group to the west, from the floating reserve and from elements of the group on Måløy. House-to-house fighting ensued, but by 1345 hours it was over and the force re-embarked soon afterwards; 15,000 tons of shipping and all German installations were destroyed, as well as warehouses, dockyards and fish-oil processing plants. 98 Germans were taken prisoner along with 4 'Quislings', 77 Norwegians also decided to come with them back to Britain. The German garrison had around 150 killed, the British lost 19 men and 57 wounded and the Norwegian force lost 1 man and 2 wounded. The after-effects of the raid had far reaching consequences, as the Germans took reprisals against the Norwegian population which prompted protests from the Norwegian King Haakon VII and the government-in-exile. The Germans also reinforced and strengthened their defences which tied down troops that could have been used elsewhere.

=== Operation Jubilee, (Dieppe raid) ===
The Dieppe Raid on 19 August 1942, involved over 6,000 Canadian soldiers supported by large British naval and Allied air force contingents. The objective was to seize the port, gather intelligence and assess the German response. The raid was also intended to use air power to draw the Luftwaffe into a large, planned encounter.

Lieutenant Colonel John Durnford-Slater's mission, with No. 3 Commando, was to neutralize a German coastal battery (code named GOEBBELS), near Berneval on the extreme left flank. This battery could engage the landing at Dieppe, some six kilometres to the west. The three 170 mm and four 105 mm guns of 2/770 Batterie had to be put out of action by the time the main force approached the beach. The craft carrying No 5 group of No 3 Commando, approaching the coast to the east, were not warned of the presence of a German coastal convoy that had been located by British "Chain Home" radar stations at 2130 hours. S-boats escorting a German tanker torpedoed some of the landing craft and disabled the escorting Steam Gun Boat 5. Subsequently Motor Launch 346 and Landing Craft Flak 1 combined to drive off the German boats, but the Group was dispersed, with some losses. The enemy's coastal defences were also alerted. Only a handful of commandos under the Second in Command, Major Peter Young, landed and scaled the barbed wire-laced cliffs. 18 Commandos reached the perimeter of the GOEBBELS Battery via Bernevall and engaged their target with small-arms fire. Unable to destroy the guns, their sniping of the crews prevented the guns from firing effectively on the main assault. Thus, a handful of determined British soldiers neutralised the most dangerous German coastal battery in the area of the raid for the most critical period of the operation.

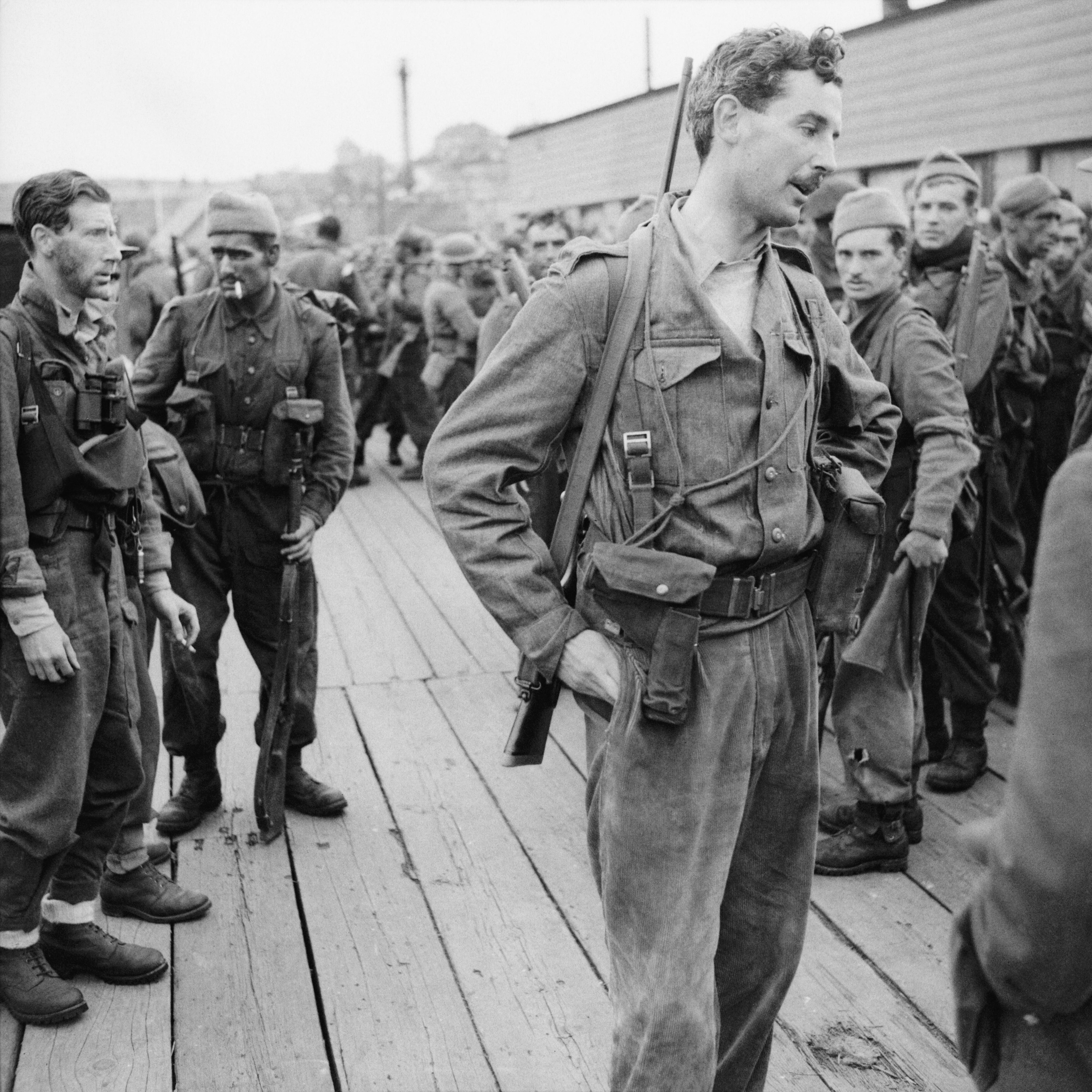
Lt Col The Lord Lovat, CO of No 4 Commando, at Newhaven after returning from the raid

No. 4 Commando was tasked with landing on the extreme right flank; they landed in force and destroyed their targets, providing the only big success of the operation. Most of No 4 returned safely to England. This portion of the raid was considered a model for future commando operations. Lord Lovat became famous as an officer on Orange Beach (and was awarded the Distinguished Service Order for his part). Captain Patrick Porteous, attached to No. 4 Commando, was awarded the Victoria Cross for bravery.

== Formation of the Brigade ==
The brigade was assembled under one commander in 1943 and trained to operate as a formation in preparation for Operation Overlord and the Normandy landings.

== D-Day, Sword ==
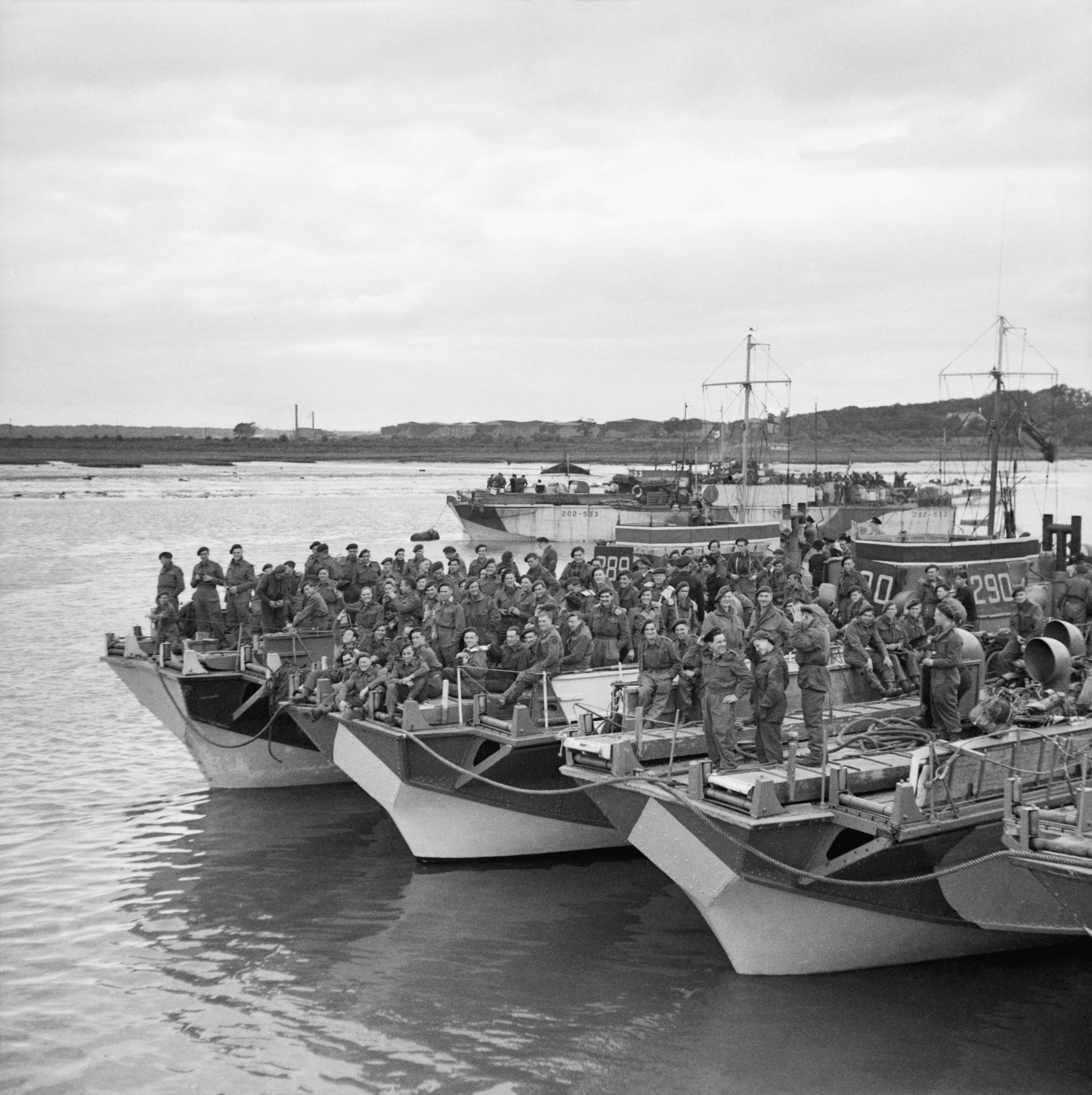
Commandos of the 1st Special Service Brigade aboard LCI (S) (Landing Craft Infantry (Small)) at Warsash, Southampton, 3 June 1944.

The plan was for 1st Special Service Brigade comprising Nos 3, 4, 6 and 45 Commando (RM) to land at Ouistreham in Queen Red sector (the most easterly). No 4 Commando were augmented by 1 and 8 Troops (both French) of No 10 (Inter Allied) Commando. No 10 (Inter-Allied) Commando was formed in January 1942 and included Nos 1 and 8 Troops (French), 4 Troop (Belgian), Dutch Troop, Norwegian Troop, Polish Troop, X Troop (German and Austrian, Hungarians and Greeks), Yugoslav Troop, which often served detached in other theatres. In August 1942 they were involved in the Dieppe raid. They also took part in the Normandy Landings and fought across North Western Europe.

The assault on Sword began at about 03:00 with an aerial bombardment of the German coastal defences and artillery sites. The naval bombardment began a few hours later. At 07:30, the first units reached the beach. These were the amphibious DD tanks of the 13th/18th Hussars; they were followed closely by the infantry of the 8th Infantry Brigade, part of the British 3rd Infantry Division.

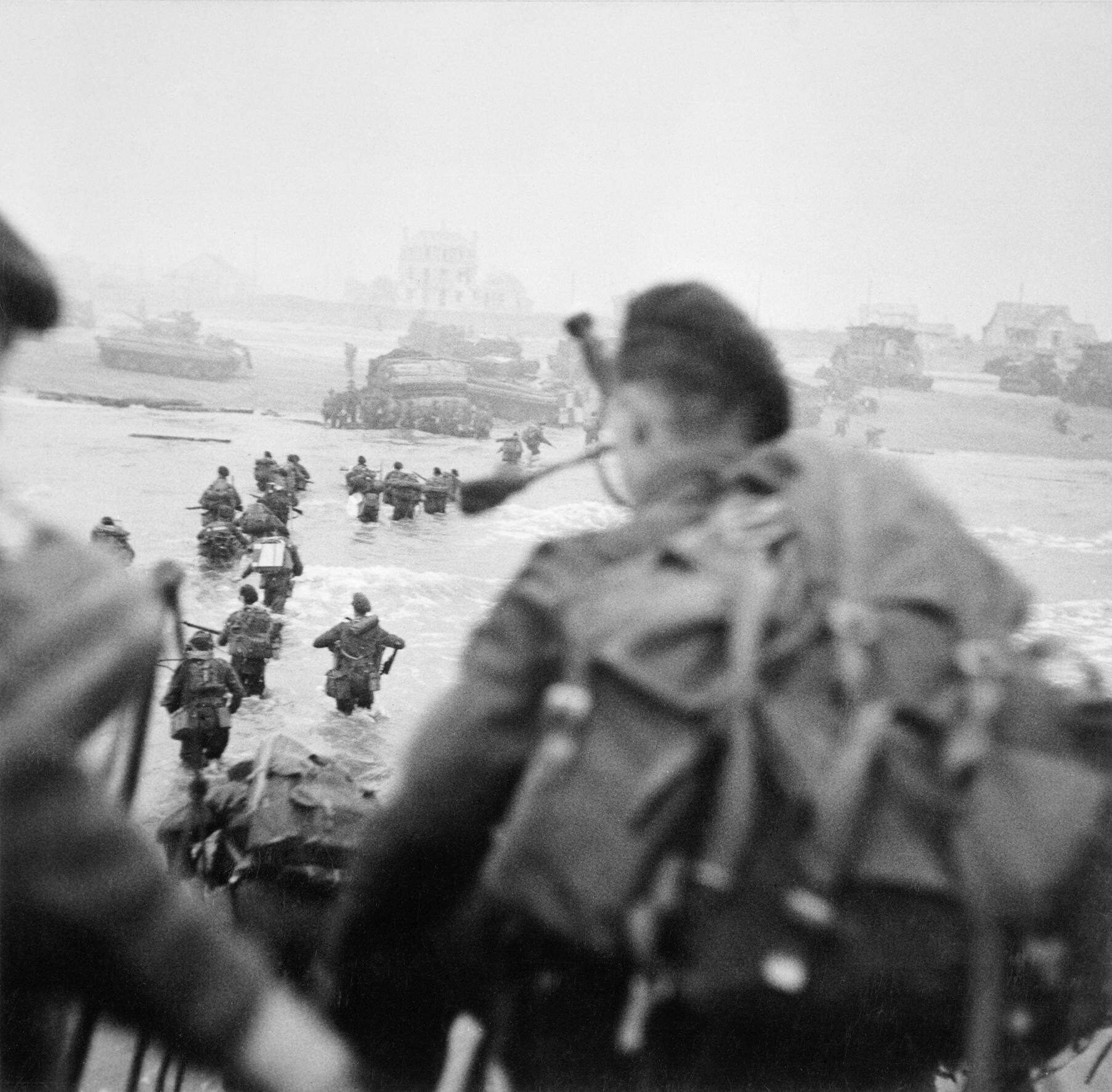
Queen Red Beach, Sword Area; Lord Lovat, on the right of the column, wades through the water. The figure in the foreground, is Piper Bill Millin.

The 1st Special Service Brigade, under the command of Brigadier Lord Lovat, were piped ashore in the second wave led by No 4 Commando with the two French Troops first, as agreed amongst themselves. The British and French personnel of No. 4 Commando had separate targets in Ouistreham: the French, a blockhouse and the Casino; the British, two batteries overlooking the beach. The blockhouse proved too strong for the Commandos' PIAT (Projector Infantry Anti Tank) weapons, but the Casino was taken with the aid of a Centaur tank. The Commandos achieved both battery objectives only to find that the guns had been removed. Leaving the mopping-up to the infantry, the Commandos withdrew from Ouistreham to join other units in their brigade, moving inland to join-up with the 6th Airborne Division.

Lord Lovat reputedly waded ashore wearing a white pullover under his battledress, with "Lovat" inscribed on the collar, while armed with an old Winchester rifle. He instructed his personal piper, Bill Millin, to play the commandos ashore, in defiance of specific orders not to allow such an action in battle.

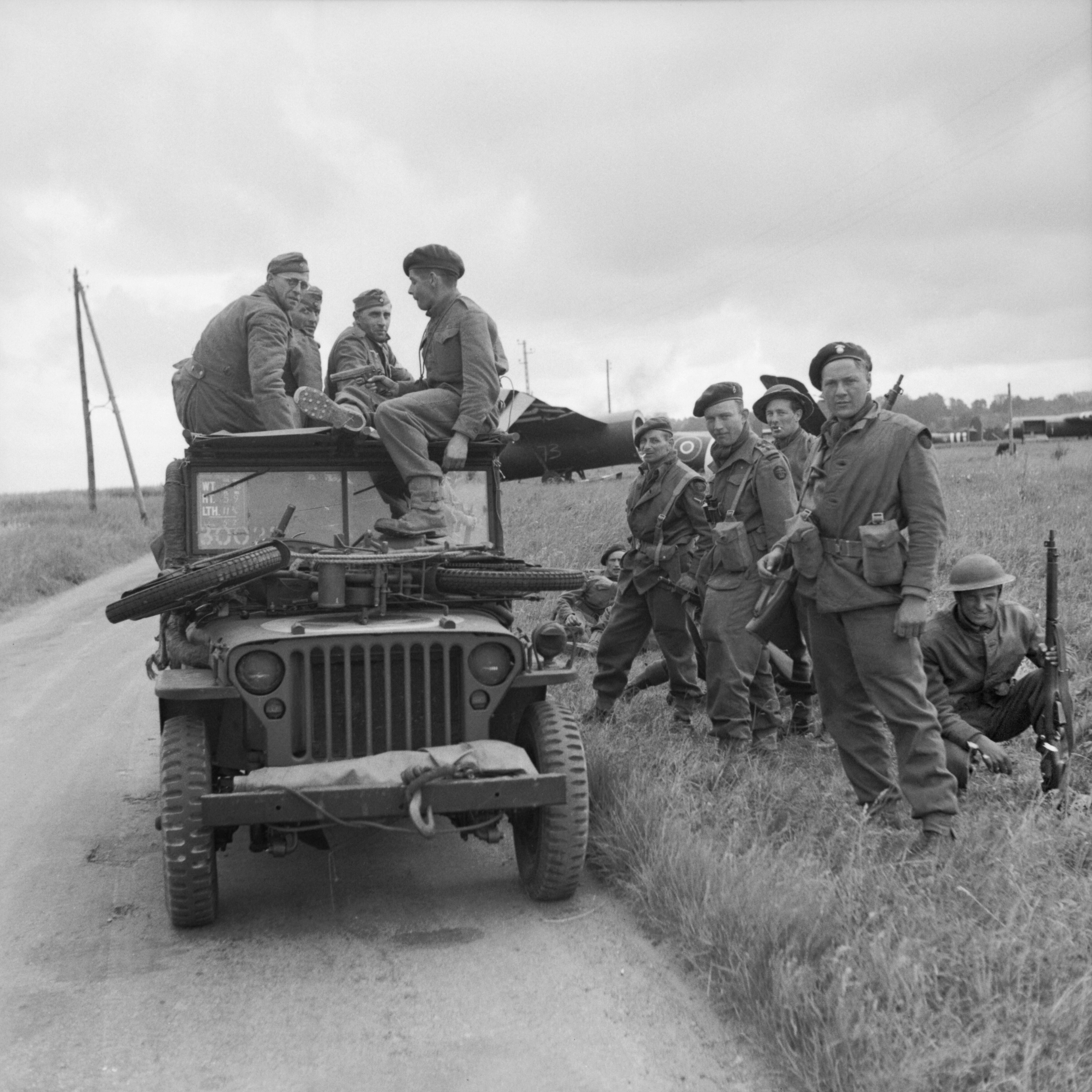
Commandos of the 1st Special Service Brigade with captured Germans on the roof of their jeep at the glider landing grounds near Ranville, 7 June 1944.

Lovat's forces pressed on, Lovat himself advancing with parts of his brigade from Sword to Pegasus Bridge, which had been obstinately defended by men of the British 6th Airborne Division who had landed in the early hours. The commandos arrived later than expected by about an hour and a half, for which Lord Lovat apologised to Lieutenant Colonel Richard Geoffrey Pine-Coffin, of the 7th Parachute Battalion. The commandos ran across Pegasus Bridge, to the sound of Bill Millin's bagpipes. Despite rushing across in small groups, twelve men were killed by sniper fire, mostly shot in the head; the men crossing the bridge wore helmets rather than berets from then on. They went on to establish defensive positions around Ranville, east of the River Orne. The bridges were relieved later in the day by elements of the British 3rd Infantry Division.

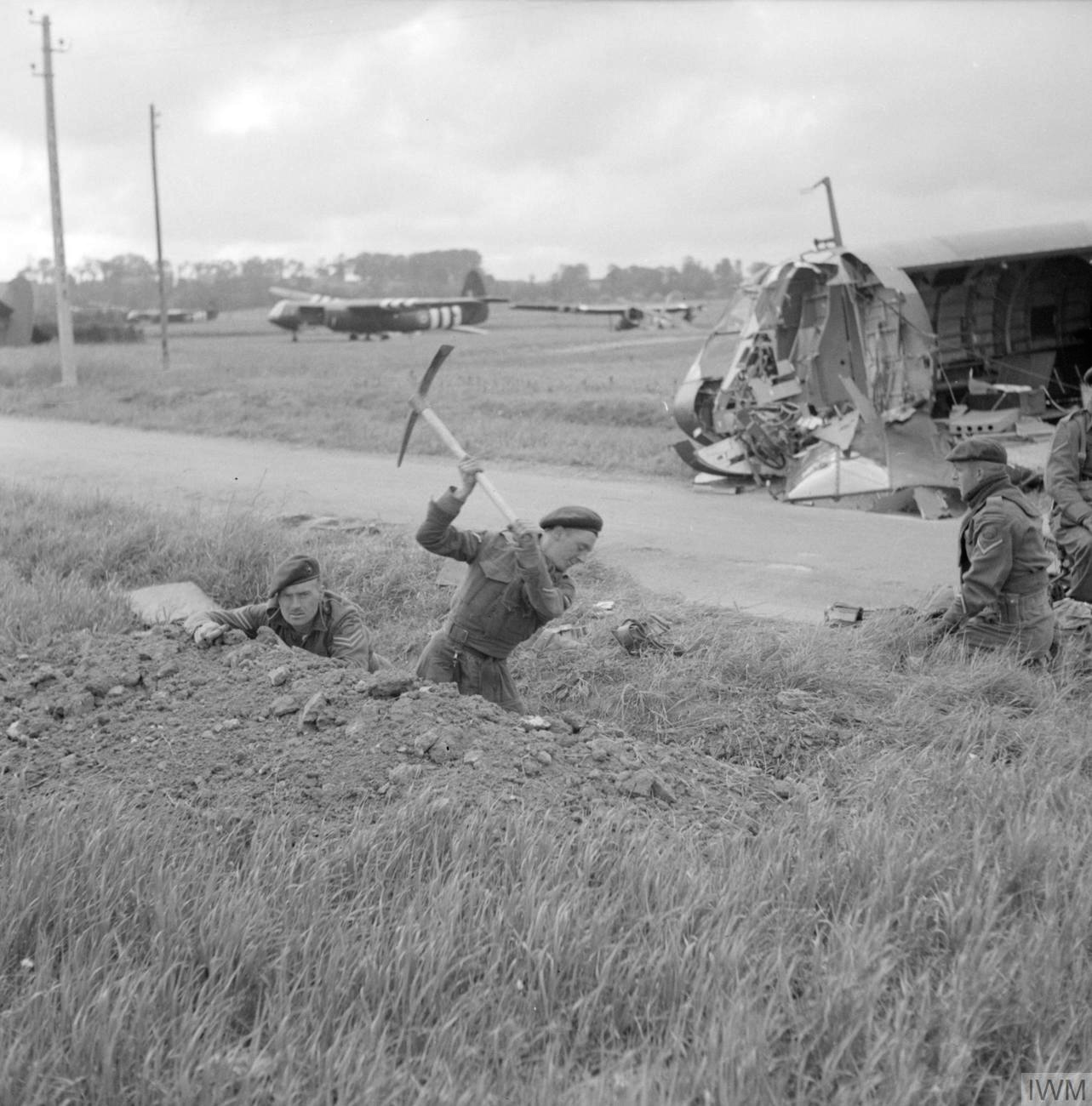
Commandos of the 1st Special Service Brigade digging in near Horsa gliders on the 6th Airborne Division's lodgement zone east of the River Orne, 7 June 1944.

During an attack on the village of Bréville on 12 June, Lord Lovat was seriously wounded while observing an artillery bombardment by the 51st (Highland) Infantry Division. A stray shell fell short of its target and landed amongst the officers, killing Lieutenant-Colonel A. P. Johnson, commanding officer of the 12th Parachute Battalion, and seriously wounding Brigadier Hugh Kindersley of the 6th Airlanding Brigade.

On 1 August, the Brigade was ordered to seize and hold a section of high ground by dawn the following day. This was in support of a further advance to Dozule, by 6th Airborne Division. No.4 Commando led with Nos.3, 45 and 6 following. The Brigade infiltrated the enemy line and reached their objective before the Germans realized it. There were four counter-attacks throughout the day but the brigade held firm.

1st Special Service Brigade returned to England on 8–9 September 1944, landing at Southampton and Gosport. During this period new volunteers were recruited and trained. No.4 Commando was later sent back to the continent to take over from the shattered 46 (RM) Commando, which was down to a strength of 200 men.

In December 1944 all Special Service Brigades were renamed Commando Brigades, but with the same Brigade number, so 1st Special Service Brigade was now 1st Commando Brigade.

About the same time there were plans to send 1 Commando Brigade to the Far East, but due to the German counter-offensive in the Ardennes over the New Year and in January, they returned to mainland Europe.

== Operation Blackcock ==
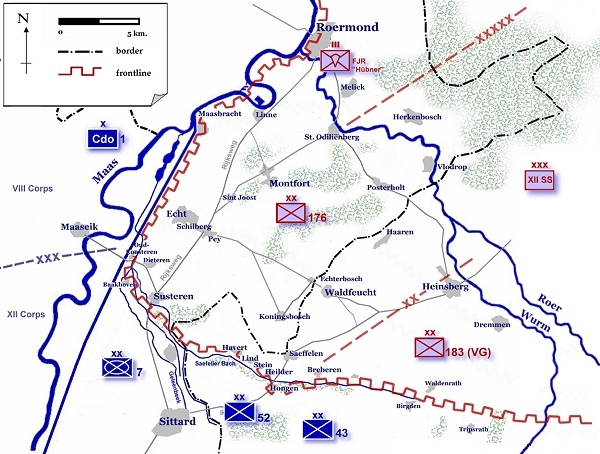
Dispositions in the Roer Triangle, January 1945.

In the aftermath of the Battle of the Bulge in January 1945, the Brigade took part in Operation Blackcock, and was temporarily placed under command of the 7th Armoured Division. It was during this period of operations that Lance Corporal Henry Eric Harden, a medical orderly of the RAMC attached to 45 RM Commando, posthumously won the Victoria Cross. With complete disregard for his own safety, Cpl Harden rescued two of his wounded comrades from a field that was under heavy machine gun and mortar fire. During this action he was wounded himself a couple of times. In his attempt to rescue a third person, he was mortally wounded and died instantly. This all happened in the little town of Brachterbeek, in the province of Limburg, Netherlands.

== Crossing the Rhine ==
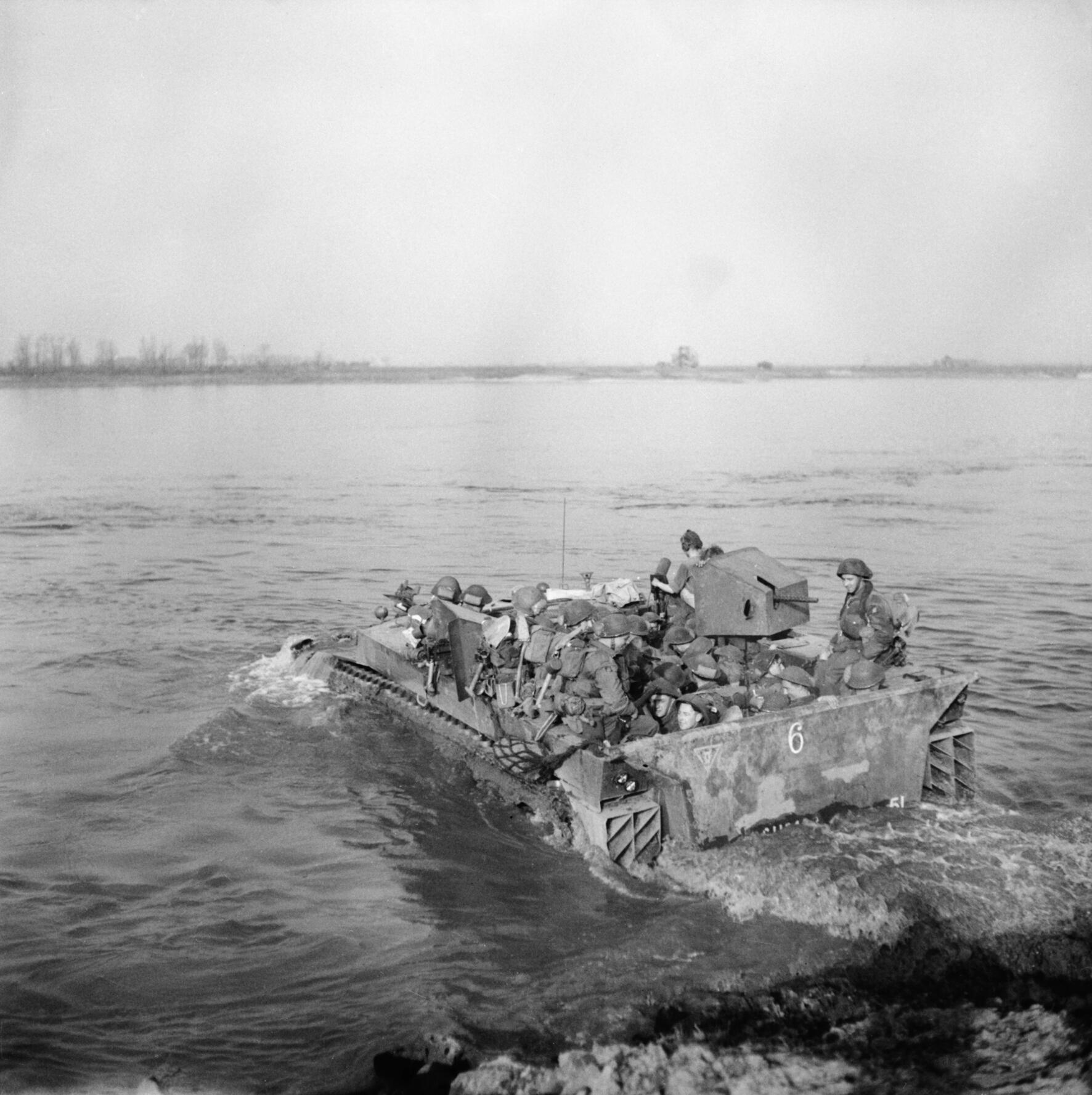
Crossing the Rhine.

The Brigade's next large-scale operation was the crossing of the river Rhine at Wesel. Intensive training and detailed planning were the keys to the remarkable success of Operation Plunder on 23 March, which incurred less than 100 casualties.

=== Operation Plunder ===
Operation Plunder started at 1800 hours on 23 March with a barrage of 5,500 guns along the 35 km front and a bomber raid on the city of Wesel. The 51st (Highland) Infantry Division led the river crossing at 2300 hours with the Canadians crossing later 6.5 km south of Rees, then the 1st Commando Brigade, 1.5 km north of Wesel. The assault craft—Buffalo amphibious vehicles, assault boats and DUKWs carried the infantry; LCMs carried the armour, including Sherman DD tanks—were guided across the river by CDL searchlights and tracer fire from machine guns. General Patton had earlier put the US 5th Infantry Division across the Rhine by initiating an amphibious crossing near Oppenheim, south of Mainz—a day earlier than planned—thus drawing off German reinforcements and reducing the opposition to the main landings.

=== Crossing the Weser ===
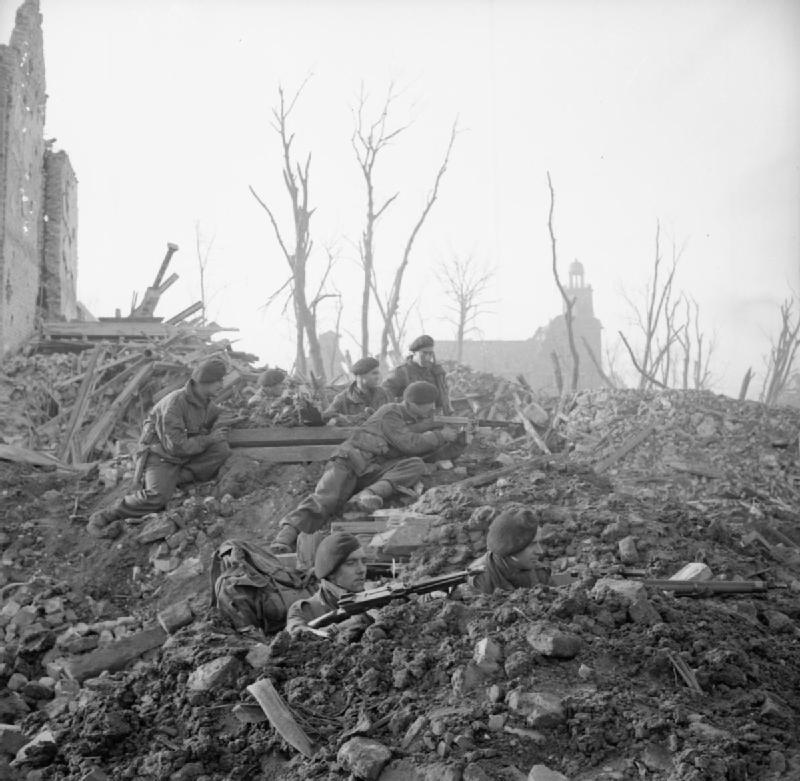
6th Commando personnel in a defensive position after capturing Wesel.

The next obstacle to be tackled was the river Weser, where the brigade was to reinforce and exploit the bridgehead that had already been established. This operation was followed by the crossing of the river Aller, which resulted in some heavy fighting in the woods beyond. A serious situation was averted by a spirited counter-attack by No.6 Commando. When "...the hunting horns sounded and led by Lieut. Colonel A. C. Lewis, the Commando charged forward through the trees at a fast double and with bayonets fixed".

By 19 April, the 1st Commando Brigade had reached Lunenburg and prepared for its final operation, the crossing of the river Elbe and the advance beyond to Neustadt. Reaching there on 3 May, No.6 Commando was the first to arrive and began sorting out the dead and the survivors of the prison ship Cap Arcona that had been attacked by the RAF by mistake whilst moored in the Bay of Lübeck. The following day, 4 May 1945, Brigadier Mills-Roberts took the surrender of Generalfeldmarschall Erhard Milch and all of the German troops under his command.

== Dissolution ==
The final chapter concerning the Commandos, during the war, was written on 25 October 1945 with the announcement by Major General Robert Laycock (who had been one of the original volunteers for the Commandos in 1940 and had been promoted to succeed Lord Louis Mountbatten as Chief of Combined Operations) that the Commandos were to be disbanded. Army Commandos were disbanded in 1946 and the Commando role was taken over by The Royal Marines.

== Battle honours ==
The following Battle honours were awarded to the Commandos during the Second World War.

- Adriatic
- Alethangyaw
- Aller
- Anzio
- Argenta Gap
- Burma 1943–45
- Crete
- Dieppe
- Dives Crossing
- Djebel Choucha
- Flushing
- Greece 1944–45
- Italy 1943–45
- Kangaw
- Landing at Porto San Venere
- Landing in Sicily
- Leese
- Litani
- Madagascar
- Middle East 1941, 1942, 1944
- Monte Ornito
- Myebon
- Normandy Landing
- North Africa 1941–43
- North-West Europe 1942, 1944–45
- Norway 1941
- Pursuit to Messina
- Rhine
- St. Nazaire
- Salerno
- Sedjenane 1
- Sicily 1943
- Steamroller Farm
- Syria 1941
- Termoli
- Vaagso
- Valli di Comacchio
- Westkapelle

== See also ==
- 2nd Special Service Brigade
- 3rd Special Service Brigade
- 4th Special Service Brigade
- Commandos (United Kingdom)
