= Sonot Kkaazoot =

Long-distance cross-country ski race at Fairbanks, Alaska, United States

- Flyer for 2012 race (25th anniversary), design by Mark Ross
- Date: late March
- Location: Fairbanks, Alaska
- Event type: Cross-country ski race
- Distance: 50 km
- Established: 1988
- Website: nscfairbanks.org

The Sonot Kkaazoot is the premier long-distance cross-country ski race in Fairbanks, Alaska. The race includes three events, a 50 km (31 mile) a 30 km (18.6 mile), and a 10 km (6.2 mile) course. All races are freestyle, mass start events that begin and end at Birch Hill Recreation Area.

== Origins ==
The race was founded in 1988 by noted Fairbanks skier Bob Baker. The name of the race is based on a Koyukon word which translates roughly as 'sliding around in early spring' and was used by Native people to describe the motion of cross-country skiers.

The original race courses began and ended on the Chena River in downtown Fairbanks. Due to unreliable ice conditions on the Chena River, as of 2022 the race has been held entirely on the trails at Birch Hill.

== Original Course ==
The original race featured 20 km and 50 km events which began and ended on the Chena River near the Cushman Street bridge in downtown Fairbanks. The course then proceeded up the Chena River, entered Fort Wainwright army post and continued as far as the Birch Hill Ski & Snowboard Area. At that point the 20 km race turned around and returns via the same course back to the start/finish area.

The 50 km course proceeded up the Birch Hill alpine ski hill to connect with the trails system at the Birch Hill Recreation Area. From there the course followed all of the trails in the Birch Hill system (excepting the classic-only trails) in a counter-clockwise direction. After approximately 27 km the course again returned to the top of the alpine ski hill and proceeded back to the river and to the start/finish area by the same route.

In 2012 the 50 km race began making use of a new trail constructed to gain access to the Birch Hill Recreation Area. Rather than climbing directly up the alpine ski hill, the Sonot Connector trail climbs through the forest to the east of the ski hill, starting from the top of the rope tow and making two long switchbacks.

Adjustments to the course were sometimes made due to weather or snow conditions. When it was not possible to hold the race on river, either due to ice conditions or cold temperatures, the race was held entirely on the trail system at the Birch Hill Recreation Area, beginning and ending in the stadium area. In these cases the race was usually shortened to compensate for the addition of steeper terrain. In years of low snowfall when it was not possible to easily connect between the river and the alpine ski area, the race was held entirely on the river. In this the 20 km course remains unchanged, but the 50 km course proceeded slightly further up the river before turning around at 12.5 km, returning to the start, and then doing another lap of the same course along the river.

Elevation profile of 2011 course

== Past winners ==
50 km race
Year	Men	Time	Women	Time
2026-03-21	Aidan Hay	2:33:17.1	Tabitha Williams	2:55:57.3
2025-03-22	Peter Hinds	2:18:27.1	Astrid Stav	2:41:51.0
2024-03-23	Christopher Kalev	2:15:39.4	Rosie Fordham	2:34:37.7
2023-03-25	Christopher Kalev	2:19:00.6	Mariel Merlii Pulles	2:41:08.6
2022-03-26	Galen Johnson	2:35:05.8	Rosie Fordham	2:43:15.8
2019-03-23*	Eric Packer	1:12:12.9	Marine Dusser	1:22:53.7
2018-03-24	Ti Donaldson	2:19:15.0	Sarah Freistone	2:54:42.3
2017-03-25	Peter Leonard	2:33:08.4	Kate Fitzgerald	2:55:25.9
2016-03-26	Seiji Takagi	2:20:30.2	Rebecca Konieczny	2:42:00.7
2015-03-28	Jack Novak	2:12:10.3	Rebecca Konieczny	2:23:40.6
2014-03-29	Cody Priest	2:21:55.2	Rebecca Konieczny	2:33:38.7
2013-03-23	Victor Brannmark	2:33:07.5	Raphaela Sieber	3:12:02.2
2012-03-24	Lex Treinen	2:28:31.2	Heather Edic	2:55:31.2
2011-03-21	Erik Soederstrom	2:13:48.1	Melissa Lewis	2:35:15.2
2010-03-28	Lex Treinen	2:17:30.0	Raphaela Sieber	2:30:35.9
2009-03-14	Tyson Flaharty	2:15:06.9	Davya Flaharty	3:06:40.4
2008-03-22	Petter Eliassen	1:57:55	Sigrid Aas	2:15:22
2007-03-25	Trond Flagstad	2:38:32	Kate Pearson	2:59:58
2006-03-25	Kjetil Dammen	2:20:45	Melissa Lewis	2:41:02
2005-03-26	Thomas Oyberg	2:11:55.0	Melissa Lewis	2:31:13.0
2004	Erik Wickstrom	2:16:46	Melissa Lewis	2:42:15
2003-03-22	Michal Malak	1:56:20	Sigrid Aas	2:09:42
2002-03-23	Kevin Wright	2:21:19	Kiersten Lippmann	2:36:44
2001	Juraj Burgos	2:12:39	Sigrid Aas	2:42:31
2000	Juraj Burgos	2:22:56	Karin Gillis	2:56:16
1999	Audun Endestad	2:20:56	Melissa Lewis	2:47:42
1998	Audun Endestad	1:42:26	Hailey Wappett	1:56:22
1997	Audun Endestad	2:16:20	Nadezhda Simak	2:35:43
1996	Adam Verrier	2:16:29	Donna Hawkins	2:42:18
1995	Peter Alden	2:07:55	Donna Hawkins	2:24:22
1994	Ed Kohler	2:33:04	Donna Hawkins	3:00:23
1993	Peter Alden	2:12:53	Melissa Fink	2:36:00
1992	Steve Bull	2:30:59	Alina McMaster	2:55:43
1991	Dan Fleener	2:42:40	Amanda Findlater	3:39:03
1990	Peter Alden	2:23:41	Kelli Lindeman	2:55:00
1989	Jon Underwood	2:22:06	Kelly Kimball	2:43:57
1988	Tim Kelley	2:43:28	Donna DeVoe	3:09:13

- 30 km race

20 km race
Year	Men	Time	Women	Time
2018-03-24	Ari Endestad	51:59.4	Kendall Kramer	56:04.7
2017
2016
2015
2014-03-29	Ti Donaldson	50:21.6	Jenna Difolco	56:46.0
2013-03-23	Tristan Sayre	1:00:56.9	Jade Hajdukovich	1:09:13.3
2012-03-24	Max Donaldson	52:29.5	Maria Bray	1:02:43.3
2011-03-20	Max Kaufman	50:02.4	Maria Bray	55:59.9
2010-03-28	Stefan Hajdukovich	49:36.5	Crystal Pitney	59:13.7
2009-03-14	Jim Button	45:49.1	Kate Arduser	46:21.8
2007-03-25	Nicholas Ferree	1:01:08	Davya Flaharty	1:06:16
2005-03-26	Marius Korthauer	46:54.5	Christina Gillis	50:00.9
2004				
2003-03-22				
2002-03-23			Aelin Peterson	
