= Operation Bristle =

British Military Operation in June 1942

Operation Bristle was a British Commando raid over the night of the 3/4 June 1942 during the Second World War. The target of the raid was a German radar site, at Plage-Ste-Cecile between Boulogne and Le Touquet. The raiding force which was provided by No. 6 Commando was defeated by the strong German defences. During the return voyage at around dawn the naval force was attacked by German fighter aircraft which damaged two Motor Launches and one Motor Gun Boat, killing one Commando and two naval personnel and wounding another 19; only the arrival of Royal Air Force preventing further damage and losses.
