= Sally Zack =

American cyclist (born 1962)

Personal information
- Full name: Sally M. Endestad
- Born: August 1, 1962 (age 64) North Conway, New Hampshire, United States
- Height: 160 cm (5 ft 3 in)
- Weight: 50 kg (110 lb)

Cycling career
- Sport: Cycling
- Discipline: Road cycling
- Role: Rider

Sally M. Endestad (born August 1, 1962) is a road cyclist from United States. She represented her nation at the 1988 Summer Olympics in the women's road race and at the 1992 Summer Olympics in the women's road race.

She is married to Norwegian-born American Olympic cross country skier Audun Endestad.
