= Måløy Bridge =

Måløy Bridge Måløybrua
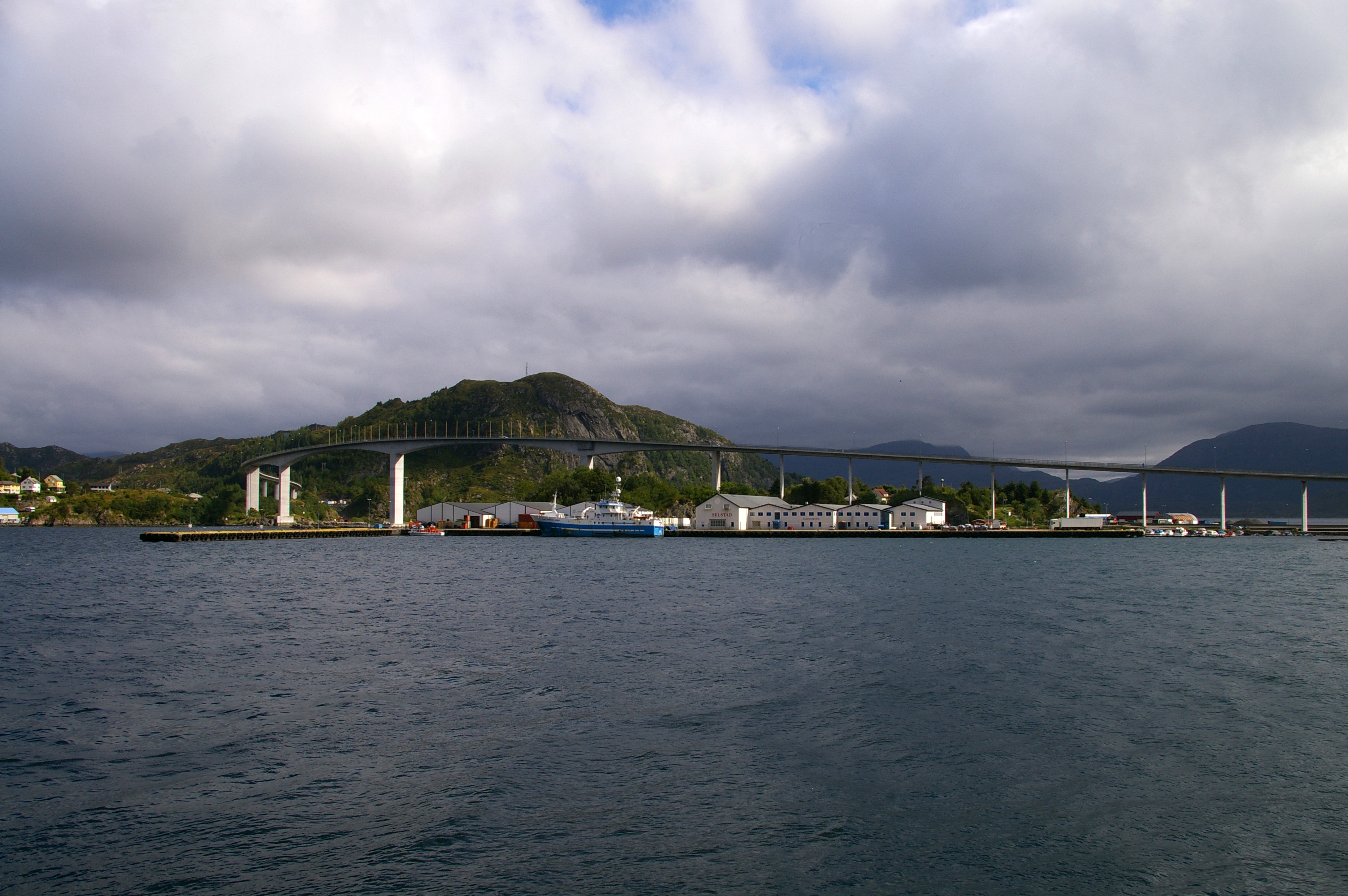
- View of the bridge
- Coordinates: 61°55′45″N 5°07′21″E
- Carries: Rv15
- Crosses: Måløystraumen
- Locale: Måløy, Norway

Characteristics
- Design: Cantilever
- Total length: 1,224 metres (4,016 ft)
- Longest span: 125 metres (410 ft)
- No. of spans: 34
- Clearance below: 42 metres (138 ft)

History
- Construction start: November 1971
- Opened: December 1973
- Inaugurated: 11 July 1974

The Måløy Bridge (Norwegian: Måløybrua) is a cantilever road bridge in Kinn Municipality in Vestland county, Norway. The bridge connects the village area of Degnepoll on the mainland and the town of Måløy on the island of Vågsøy. The bridge carries Norwegian national road 15 over the Måløystraumen strait and the little Måløyna island. The bridge is 1,224 metres (4,016 ft) long, the longest spans are 125 metres (410 ft), and the maximum clearance to the sea is 42 metres (138 ft). In total, the bridge has 34 spans.

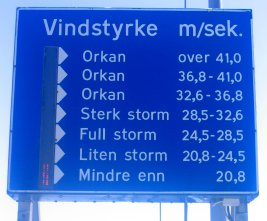
Wind speed indicator

Construction started in 1971, and it was officially opened by King Olav V on 11 July 1974, although the bridge was actually opened for traffic in December 1973. King Olav came to the opening by ship, returning from a visit to Iceland. The opening of the bridge had to be postponed for a day because the Royal Yacht got delayed by bad weather while at sea. The Måløy Bridge was the longest bridge in Norway at the time of its opening. It cost 32 million kr to construct and was a toll bridge until 1984. The bridge is built to stand wind up to 75 metres per second (170 mph), however vehicles can't stand anything near that. There are boards on each side of the bridge showing the amount of wind, and the bridge has been closed several times because of strong winds.

== See also ==
- List of bridges in Norway
- List of bridges in Norway by length
- List of bridges
- List of bridges by length
