= Bryggja =

Village in Stad Municipality, Norway

- Village
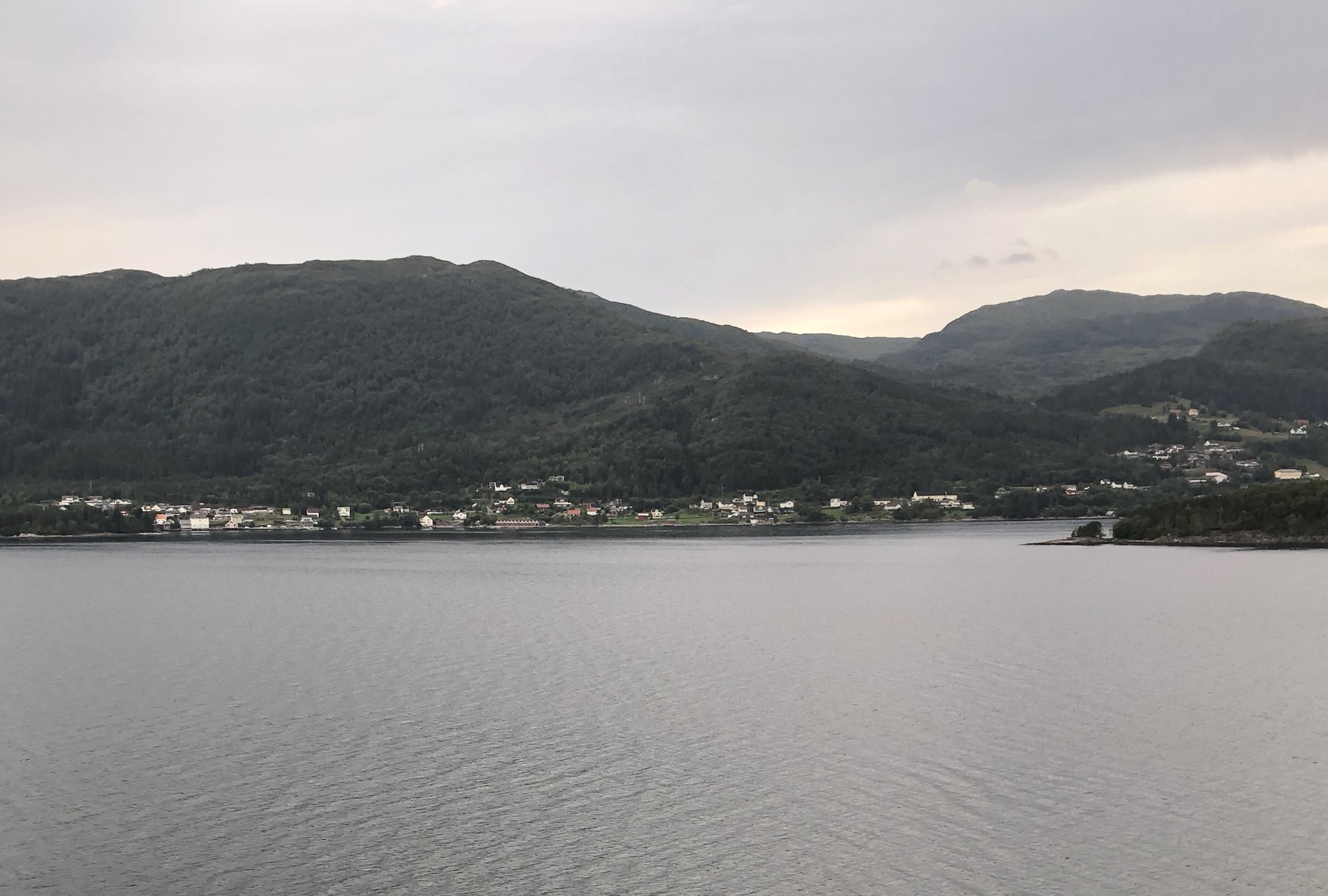
- View of the village
- Interactive map of Bryggja
- Location within Vestland Location within Norway
- Coordinates: 61.9384°N 5.4303°E
- Country: Norway
- Region: Western Norway
- County: Vestland
- District: Nordfjord
- Municipality: Stad Municipality

Area
  - Total: 0.42 km^{2} (0.16 sq mi)
- Elevation: 9 m (30 ft)

Population (2024)
  - Total: 364
  - Density: 867/km^{2} (2,250/sq mi)
- Time zone: UTC+01:00 (CET)
  - Summer (DST): UTC+02:00 (CEST)
- Post Code: 6711 Bryggja

Bryggja is a village in southwestern part of Stad Municipality in Vestland county, Norway. It is located on the mainland, along the northern shore of the Nordfjorden. The village is located about 15 kilometres (9.3 mi) east of the urban areas of Måløy–Deknepollen–Tennebø in Kinn Municipality and it is about 25 kilometres (16 mi) west of the village of Stårheim. The small village of Totland lies just west of Bryggja.

The 0.42-square-kilometre (100-acre) village has a population (2024) of 364 and a population density of 867 inhabitants per square kilometre (2,250/sq mi).

== History ==
Historically, the Bryggja area was part of the old Davik Municipality. In 1964, it was transferred to the new Vågsøy Municipality. On 1 January 2020, the Totland - Maurstad - Bryggja areas were transferred to the newly-created Stad Municipality.

== Notable people ==
- Alfred Maurstad (1896 in Bryggja – 1967), an actor, movie director, and theatre manager
- Audun Endestad (born 1953 in Bryggja), a Norwegian-American Olympic cross-country skier
