= Tennebø =

Village in Kinn Municipality, Norway

- Village
- Interactive map of Tennebø
- Location within Vestland Location within Norway
- Coordinates: 61.91739°N 5.16227°E
- Country: Norway
- Region: Western Norway
- County: Vestland
- District: Nordfjord
- Municipality: Kinn Municipality
- Elevation: 8 m (26 ft)
- Time zone: UTC+01:00 (CET)
  - Summer (DST): UTC+02:00 (CEST)
- Post Code: 6718 Deknepollen

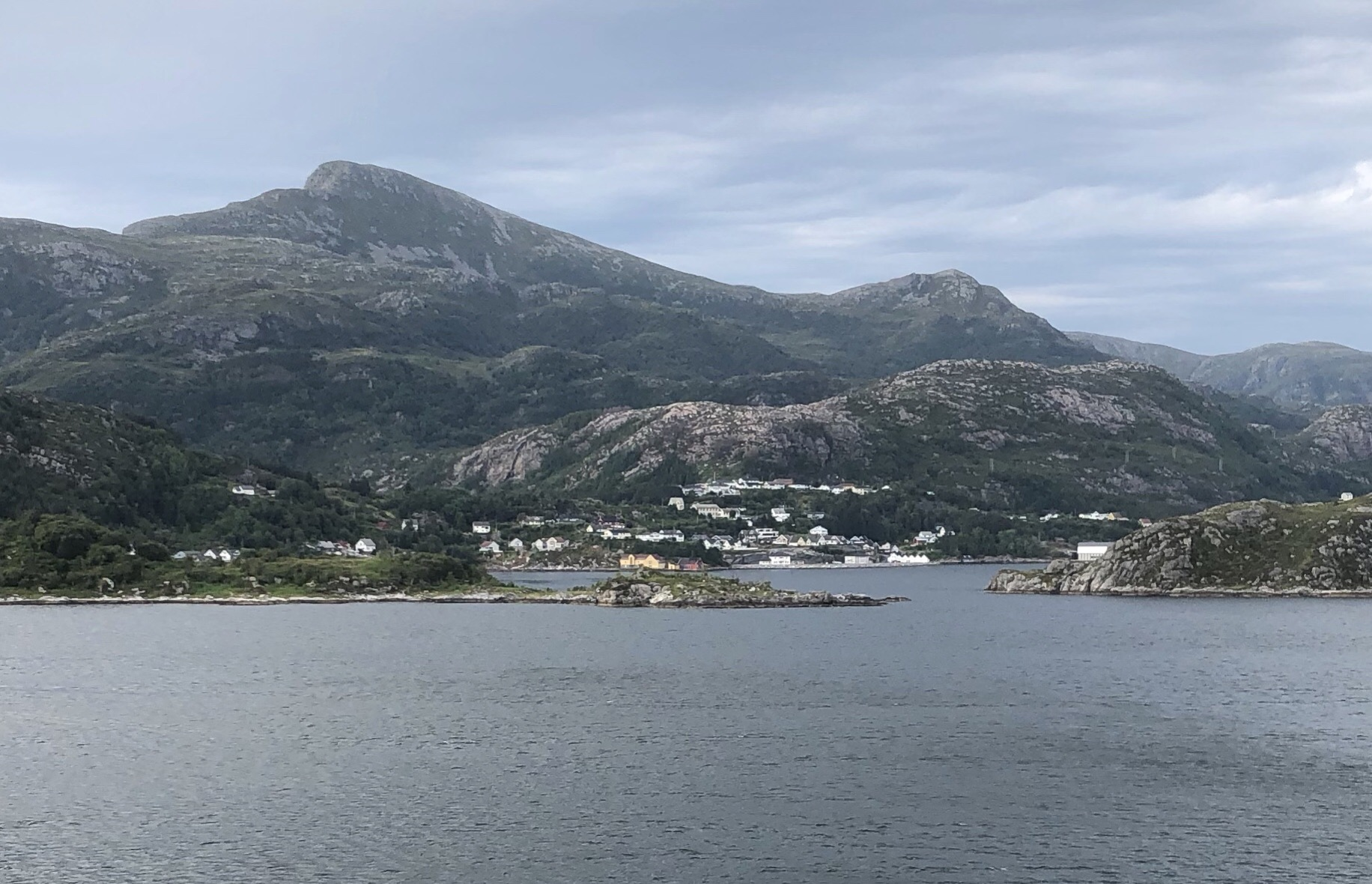
Image of Tennebø

Tennebø is a village in Kinn Municipality in Vestland county, Norway. It is a suburb of the town of Måløy, the centre of which is located about 3 kilometres (1.9 mi) away. The village of Deknepollen, another suburb of Måløy lies about 1 kilometre (0.62 mi) to the northwest. The lake Deknepollvatnet is just north of the village of Tennebø. The village sits along the Skavøypollen, a small bay off the main Nordfjorden. To the east, the village of Bryggja is about 15 kilometres (9.3 mi) away.

The population in 1999 was 481, but since 2001 it has been considered a part of the urban area of Måløy, so specific population figures are not available.

== Notable people ==
- Bjørg Sandal (born 1955), a politician from the Norwegian Labour Party is from Tennebø
