= Deknepollvatnet =

Lake in Vågsøy, Norway

Deknepollvatnet Deknevatnet
- Polljavatnet (unofficial)
- Interactive map of the lake
- Location: Kinn Municipality, Vestland
- Coordinates: 61.9229°N 5.1543°E
- Basin countries: Norway
- Max. length: 500 metres (1,600 ft)
- Max. width: 225 metres (738 ft)
- Surface area: 697 decares (172 acres)
- Shore length^{1}: 1.5 kilometres (0.93 mi)
- Surface elevation: 3 metres (9.8 ft)
- References: NVE
- ^{1} Shore length is not a well-defined measure.

Deknepollvatnet (known locally as Polljavatnet) is a 697-decare (172-acre) lake in Kinn Municipality in Vestland county, Norway. The lake is situated on the mainland between the small villages of Degnepoll and Tennebø, just 2.5 kilometres (1.6 mi) east of the town of Måløy.

The Norwegian national road 15 highway runs near the southern shore of the lake. Deknepollvatnet is a popular spot for fishing and swimming during the summer. During the winter, the lake is widely used for ice skating when there is adequate cold weather for it to freeze. The lake has been used as a source of drinking water.

== See also ==
- List of lakes in Norway
