= Derek Mills-Roberts =

WWII British army officer (1908–1980)

Brigadier Derek Mills-Roberts CBE DSO* MC
- Born: 23 November 1908
- Died: 1 October 1980 (aged 71)
- Military career
- Allegiance: United Kingdom
- Branch: British Army
- Service years: 1936–1951
- Rank: Brigadier
- Service number: 69334
- Commands: 125th Infantry Brigade (1947–1951); 1st Commando Brigade (1944–1945); 1st Special Service Brigade (1944); No. 6 Commando (1943–1944)
- Conflicts: Second World War
- Awards: Commander of the Order of the British Empire; Distinguished Service Order & Bar; Military Cross; Mentioned in Despatches; Legion of Honour (France); Croix de Guerre (France)

Brigadier Derek Mills-Roberts, CBE, DSO & Bar, MC (23 November 1908 – 1 October 1980) was a British commando who fought with the 1st Special Service Brigade during the Second World War. In a quirk of military history, he became the only Allied soldier to strike a German field marshal with the latter's own staff-of-office – when Mills-Roberts beat Generalfeldmarschall Erhard Milch over the head with the just-surrendered marshal's baton.

== Early life ==
Derek Mills-Roberts was born on 23 November 1908 in England. During the 1930s, he went to school at Liverpool College and trained to become a Solicitor at Lincoln College, University of Oxford. On 3 October 1936, he was commissioned into the Irish Guards Supplementary Reserve of Officers as a second lieutenant, having been an officer cadet of the University of Oxford contingent of the Officer Training Corps. It was at Oxford that Mills-Roberts met his good friend Lord Lovat. Mills-Roberts and Lord Lovat had actually got off on a bad start. They had a rivalry which involved a heated argument and an exchange of blows. From that time on, however, they became close friends. After graduation from Oxford, Mills-Roberts worked for his father's law firm.

== Second World War ==
Mills-Roberts began his military service in the No. 4 Commando Unit. His good friend Lord Lovat was given command of the unit, while Mills-Roberts served as second-in-command. On 3 March 1941, Mills-Roberts, in the No. 4 Commando Unit, launched a raid on the German-occupied Lofoten Islands in Norway. In the successful raid, the commandos destroyed a significant number of fish-oil factories, petrol dumps and 11 ships. They also seized encryption equipment and codebooks. In addition to the destruction of materials, the commandos captured 216 German troops, and 315 Norwegians chose to accompany the commandos back to Britain. In August 1942, Mills-Roberts was involved in the disastrous Dieppe Raid. The raid, a small scale invasion mounted by Canadian infantry and British commandos against Adolf Hitler's Atlantic Wall, was a complete failure and the units involved suffered very heavily. Lovat and Mills-Roberts's involvement in the raid was to secure the opposing flanks of the landing area and to destroy coastal batteries. Mills-Roberts was awarded the Military Cross on 2 October 1942 "in recognition of gallant and distinguished services in the combined attack on Dieppe".

By October 1942, Mills-Roberts was a lieutenant (temporary captain) (acting major). He was shortly after promoted to lieutenant colonel and given command of No. 6 Commando Unit; he was then stationed in North Africa. He was awarded the Distinguished Service Order (DSO) on 22 April 1943 "in recognition of gallant and distinguished services in North Africa". During the Normandy landings in 1944, No. 6 Commando Unit captured the port of Ouistreham and linked up with the 6th Airborne Division on the eastern flank of Sword. Mills-Roberts was awarded a Bar to his DSO on 21 June 1945 "in recognition of gallant and distinguished services in North-West Europe".

Later in the war, Mills-Roberts took part in the Bergen-Belsen concentration camp's liberation. When Generalfeldmarschall Erhard Milch, a very senior-ranking commander in the Luftwaffe, was captured and surrendered his command baton to Mills-Roberts, the latter venting his anger about the atrocities he had seen at Bergen-Belsen, then proceeded to brutally strike the field marshal's baton over Milch's head until it broke. The broken pieces of the baton were retrieved by his batman and the remains were given to Mills-Roberts' wife Jill, who had the baton restored at Swaine Adeney Brigg (now Swaine London), but the replacement shaft was slightly longer than the original. In later years, Jill sold the baton at auction. Before the auction, an injunction was put on the sale by the Milch family, who contested ownership, saying that the baton was "stolen" from Milch. A local magistrate in the United Kingdom decided that the baton was legitimate war booty and the sale continued; eventually the baton went to an American collector in Florida. By June 1945, Mills-Roberts was a brigadier (temporary).

In the 1951 New Year Honours, Mills-Roberts was appointed a Commander of the Order of the British Empire (CBE).
