= Bjørg Sandal =

Norwegian director and politician

Bjørg Kirsten Sandal (born 2 March 1955) is a Norwegian director and politician for the Labour Party.

She is from Tennebø in Sogn og Fjordane, and a sister of fellow politician Reidar Sandal.

A cand.mag. by education, she was hired to the Phillips Petroleum Company in Norway in 1987. During the first cabinet Stoltenberg, Sandal was appointed State Secretary in the Ministry of Petroleum and Energy. She held the position until after the 2001 elections, which caused the cabinet to fall. In 2002, she became director of communications of the Western Norway Regional Health Authority.

She served in the position of deputy representative to the Norwegian Parliament from Rogaland during the term 2005–2009.
