= Operation Myrmidon =

Aborted British Commando raid during World War II

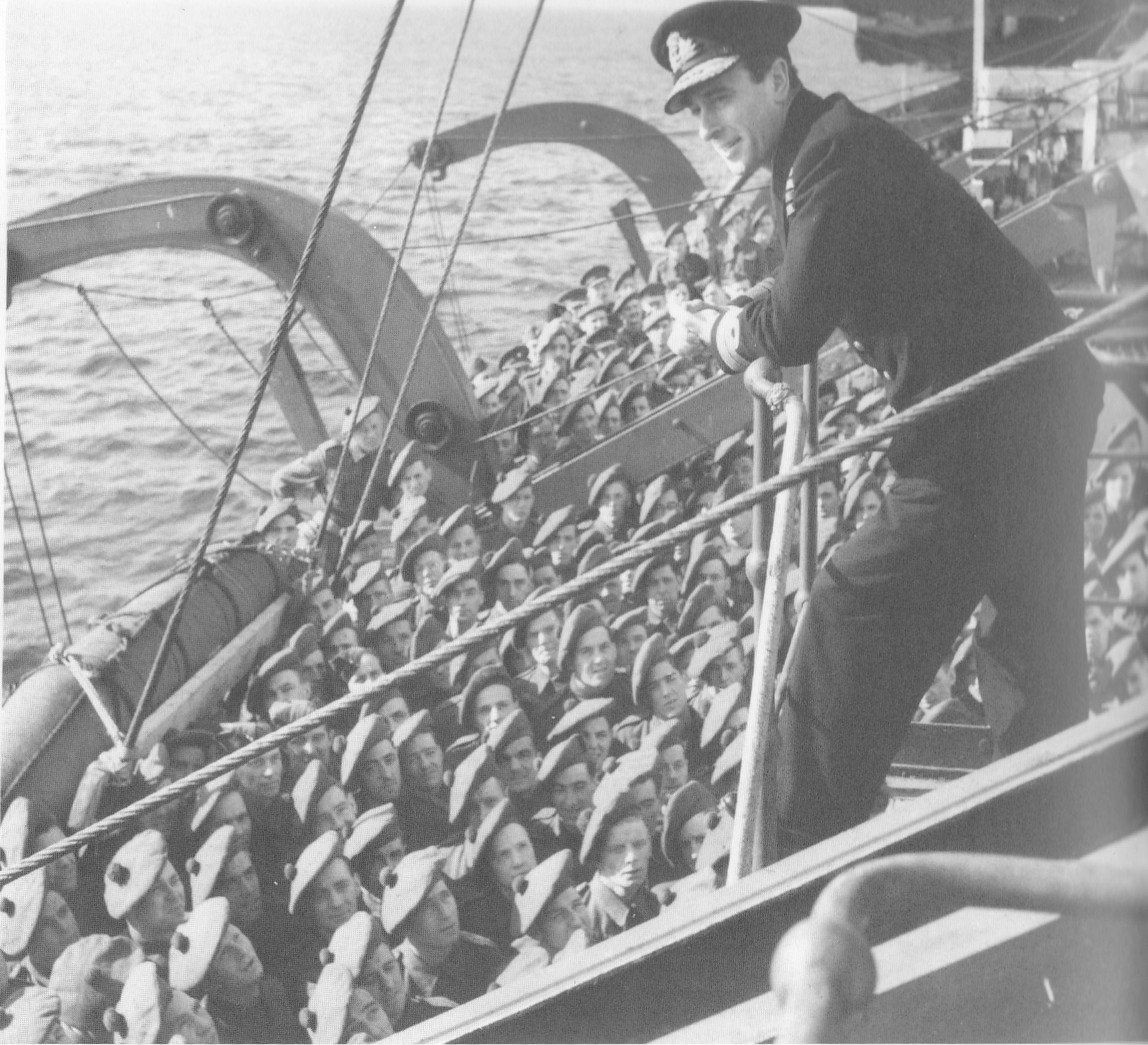
Lord Louis Mountbatten addresses troops from No. 6 Commando prior to Operation Myrmidon, April 1942

Operation Myrmidon was a planned raid during the Second World War by No. 1 Commando and No. 6 Commando in April 1942. This operation was an abortive raid on the Adour Estuary in south-western France. The plan was to disrupt road and rail transport between France and Spain by landing approximately 3,000 troops, consisting of two commandos, No. 1 and No. 6, who would be followed up by one and a half Royal Marine battalions along with an armoured regiment and a motor battalion. After embarking on the transport ships Queen Emma and Princess Beatrix, the force spent a month sailing off the French coast disguised as Spanish merchant ships. On 5 April the ships approached the mouth of the estuary in order to carry out the landing. However, amid bad weather, they encountered a sandbar that they had not expected and were unable to pass it; the raid was called off and the ships returned to the United Kingdom.
