= Pointe Pescarde =

Coordinates: 36°49′5″N 3°0′36″E

Pointe Pescarde is located in Tipaza, Algeria. It is about 3 miles (4.8 km) from Algiers.
