= Måløyna =

Island in Vestland, Norway

Måløyna Måløya Lisjemåløyna (unofficial) Øyna (unofficial) Moldøen (historic)
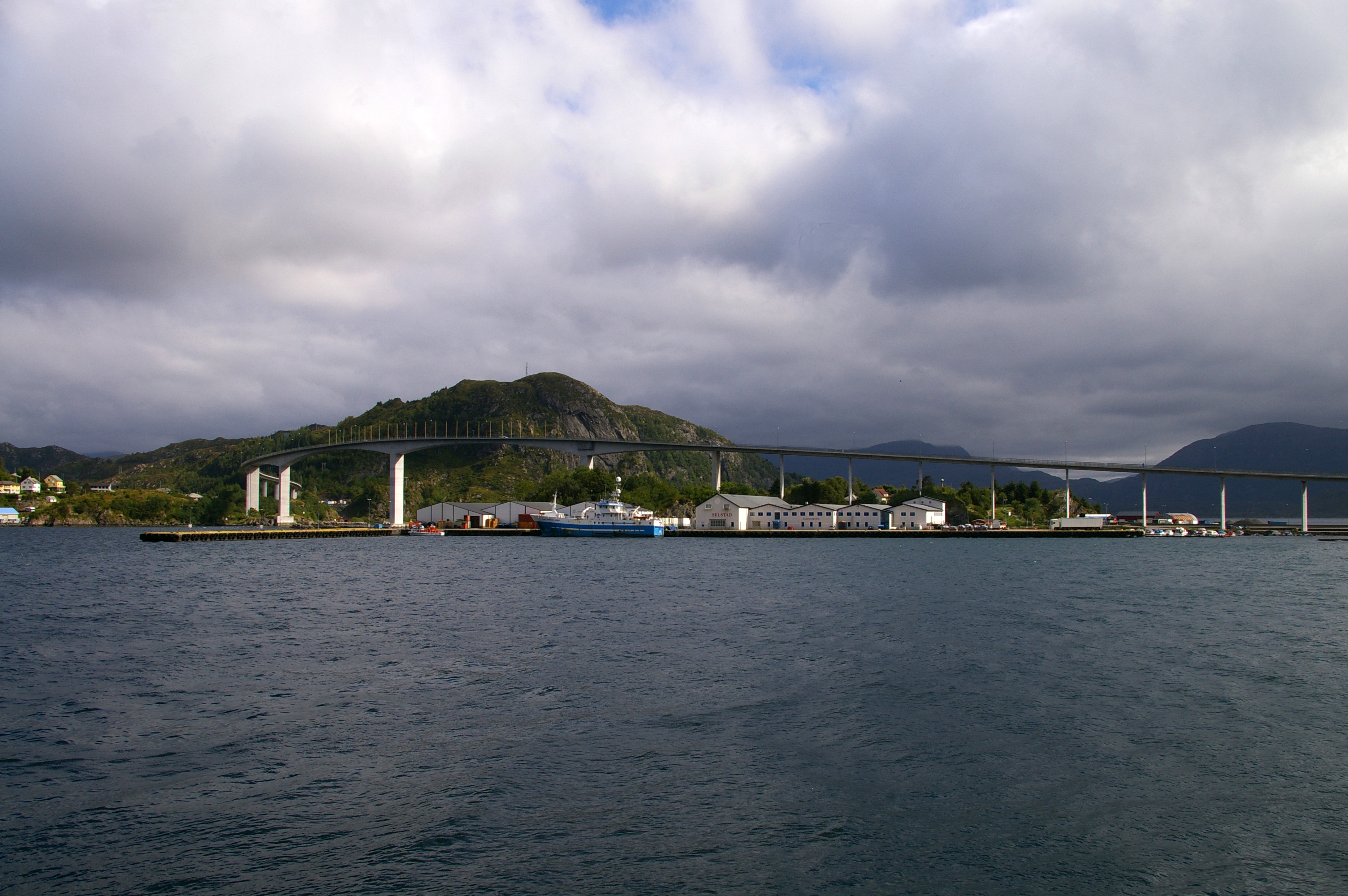
- View of the industrial part of the island
- Interactive map of Måløyna; Måløya; Lisjemåløyna (unofficial); Øyna (unofficial); Moldøen (historic)

Geography
- Location: Vestland, Norway
- Coordinates: 61.92865°N 5.118425°E
- Area: 7.24 km^{2} (2.80 sq mi)
- Length: 400 m (1300 ft)
- Width: 260 m (850 ft)
- Coastline: 1.2 km (0.75 mi)

Administration
- Norway
- County: Vestland
- Municipality: Kinn Municipality

Måløyna or Måløya is a small island in Kinn Municipality in Vestland county, Norway. It is located immediately east of the town centre in Måløy in the Ulvesund strait between the large island of Vågsøy and the village of Degnepoll on the mainland.

== History ==
Historically, the island was strategically placed in the main shipping lane on Norway's coast with harbour facilities for vessels sailing between Bergen and Northern Norway and was visited by King Frederik IV in 1704. The island became an important trading post for the region and was the original site of the town of Måløy. The island with its trading privileges was owned by a number of succeeding families such as Fester, Glad, Friis, Knoph, Schmidt, and Lem until the area was expropriated by the municipality for development. The town has since spread onto the island of Vågsøy, where the majority of the town is now located, and in recent decades onto the mainland.

During World War II, the island was the site of a German coastal fort. Operation Archery took place on and around the island, and during the fighting, all the island's original buildings were destroyed. Today, the island is connected to Måløy by a land-filled causeway and is the site of a park featuring the remains of the German fort, two memorials of World War II and a disc golf course. The island also has a modern rope and trawl factory, a large freeze warehouse, and an ISPS port. The island is also the base for several pillars that support the Måløy Bridge which connects the island of Vågsøy to the mainland.

== See also ==
- List of islands of Norway
