= Ras Acrata =

Coordinates: 36°48′15″N 2°53′43″E

Ras Acrata is a cape located in Algeria, about 16 kilometres (9.9 mi) from Algiers.
