= Deknepollen =

Village in Kinn Municipality, Norway

- Village
- Nickname: Polljen
- Interactive map of Deknepollen
- Location within Vestland Location within Norway
- Coordinates: 61.92523°N 5.14725°E
- Country: Norway
- Region: Western Norway
- County: Vestland
- District: Nordfjord
- Municipality: Kinn Municipality
- Elevation: 4 m (13 ft)

Population (2001)
  - Total: 245
- Time zone: UTC+01:00 (CET)
  - Summer (DST): UTC+02:00 (CEST)
- Post Code: 6718 Deknepollen

Deknepollen is a neighborhood in Kinn Municipality in Vestland county, Norway. Deknepollen is located on the mainland and it is an eastern suburb of the town of Måløy (which is located on the island of Vågsøy), which it is connected to by a 1,224-metre (4,016 ft) long Måløy Bridge. It is also located about 15 kilometres (9.3 mi) west of the village of Bryggja. The village of Tennebø is located about 1 kilometre (0.62 mi) southeast of Deknepollen, with the lake Deknepollvatnet located between the two villages. Before the Måløy Bridge was constructed, there was a ferry from Deknepollen to Måløy.

The name Deknepollen could be roughly translated as a "small fjord arm by the deacon". Degnepoll (an older spelling) is also a surname used by some families originating from the community or still living there. The estimated population (2001) of Deknepollen is 245.

The main industry is fish processing and the main production facility produces fish oil and animal fodder. This factory was under construction during World War II and was destroyed during Operation Archery days before it could have been put into operation. Degnepoll has a combined post office, gas station, and fast food vendor in addition to an electronics shop, two car dealerships, and two supermarkets.
