= Audun Endestad =

American cross-country skier (born 1953)

Personal information
- Nationality: United States
- Born: January 19, 1953 (age 73) Bryggja, Norway

Sport
- Sport: Skiing

World Cup career
- Seasons: 7 – (1983–1986, 1989–1990, 1992)
- Indiv. starts: 18
- Indiv. podiums: 0
- Team starts: 1
- Team podiums: 0
- Overall titles: 0 – (26th in 1985)

Audun Endestad (born January 19, 1953) is a Norwegian-born American cross-country skier, author and field guide. He is a past Olympic, World and National Team cross-country skier.

== Biography ==
Audun Gudmund Endestad was born in Bryggja, Sogn og Fjordane, Norway. Endestad competed from 1984 to 1997. He finished 18th in the 50 km event at the 1984 Winter Olympics in Sarajevo. He is a six-time Great American Ski Chase champion and 13-time National cross-country skiing champion.

== Family ==
Endestad is married to Sally Zack, a former Olympic, World and National Team Bicycle Racer, who competed for the United States in Olympic cycling in 1988 and 1992. They live in Alaska and own the Endestad Atomic Ski Camp.

== Cross-country skiing results ==
All results are sourced from the International Ski Federation (FIS).

=== Olympic Games ===
Year	Age	15 km	30 km	50 km	4 × 10 km relay
1984	31	—	—	18	—

=== World Championships ===
Year	Age	10 km	15 km classical	15 km freestyle	30 km	50 km	4 × 10 km relay
1985	32	—N/a	—N/a	37	38	—	—
1987	34	—N/a	—	—N/a	—	—	14
1989	36	—N/a	—	47	42	28	13
1991	38	—	—N/a	46	35	39	13

=== World Cup ===
==== Season standings ====
Season	Age	Overall
1983	30	63
1984	31	36
1985	32	26
1986	33	46
1989	36	NC
1990	37	43
1992	39	NC

== Selected works ==
- Endestad, Audun; Teaford, John (1987). Skating for Cross-Country Skiers. Human Kinetics Publishers. ISBN 978-0-88011-282-6.
