= List of villages in Vestland =

This is a list of villages in Vestland, a county of Norway (formed on 1 January 2020 with the merging of the counties of Hordaland and Sogn og Fjordane). The rows highlighted in blue represent the administrative centers of the municipality. This list does not include any towns/cities in the county.

Place	Coordinates	Postal Code	Municipality
Abbedisso	60°32′16″N 05°00′58″E	5314	Askøy
Algrøyna	60°21′28″N 04°57′33″E	5357	Øygarden
Allmenningen	61°54′40″N 05°14′29″E	6713	Kinn
Alsvåg/Meland	59°46′27″N 05°12′05″E	5430	Bømlo
Alsåker	60°23′00″N 06°30′00″E	5778	Ullensvang
Alveim	60°36′04″N 04°48′20″E	5336	Øygarden
Alver	60°34′13″N 05°14′15″E	5911	Alver
Alverstraumen	60°34′45″N 05°12′56″E	5911	Alver
Arnafjord	61°01′20″N 06°23′04″E	6893	Vik
Ask	60°28′48″N 05°12′53″E	5307	Askøy
Askeland	60°40′00″N 05°26′00″E	5993	Alver
Askeland	60°37′44″N 05°07′35″E	5938	Alver
Askvoll	61°20′46″N 05°04′13″E	6980	Askvoll
Asseim	61°01′02″N 05°29′32″E	5961	Gulen
Auklandshamn (Økland)	59°39′00″N 05°23′00″E	5551	Sveio
Aurlandsvangen	60°54′29″N 07°11′23″E	5745	Aurland
Austbygdi	60°29′07″N 05°33′13″E	5282	Osterøy
Austevollhella	60°06′00″N 05°10′00″E	5384	Austevoll
Austgulen	60°59′28″N 05°19′24″E	5961	Gulen
Austmarka	60°37′07″N 05°10′50″E	5938	Alver
Austreim	61°10′00″N 05°56′58″E	6995	Høyanger
Austrepollen	60°07′37″N 06°17′40″E	5476	Kvinnherad
Austrheim	60°45′49″N 04°54′44″E	5943	Austrheim
Bakka	60°54′58″N 06°52′08″E	5749	Aurland
Bakka	60°15′00″N 06°01′00″E	5630	Kvam
Bakkasund	60°07′49″N 05°05′21″E	5385	Austevoll
Balestrand	61°12′27″N 06°32′00″E	6898	Sogndal
Barekstad	61°40′06″N 04°53′19″E	6916	Kinn
Barmen	61°59′57″N 05°17′24″E	6715	Stad
Bekkjarvik	60°00′29″N 05°12′02″E	5397	Austevoll
Berge	61°10′56″N 05°59′30″E	6995	Høyanger
Berland	60°31′29″N 05°03′30″E	5314	Askøy
Berle	61°49′52″N 05°07′04″E	6719	Bremanger
Bernes	60°36′00″N 05°31′00″E	5283	Osterøy
Birkeland	60°06′12″N 05°13′55″E	5392	Austevoll
Bjordal	61°04′34″N 05°49′53″E	5962	Høyanger
Bjorøyhavn	60°19′21″N 05°11′08″E	5177	Øygarden
Bjørsviki	60°38′00″N 05°30′00″E	5993	Alver
Bleie	60°14′47″N 06°33′53″E	5776	Ullensvang
Blom	60°32′08″N 04°53′30″E	5337	Øygarden
Blomsterdalen	60°16′54″N 05°14′49″E	5258	Bergen
Blomvåg	60°31′48″N 04°52′27″E	5337	Øygarden
Blålid	61°55′10″N 05°07′58″E	6718	Kinn
Bogo	60°28′00″N 05°45′00″E	5725	Vaksdal
Bolstadøyri	60°38′00″N 05°58′00″E	5723	Voss
Borgund	61°02′55″N 07°48′47″E	6888	Lærdal
Borstrondi	60°39′23″N 06°25′56″E	5710	Voss
Botnen	61°14′51″N 05°38′55″E	6966	Fjaler
Botnen	59°45′11″N 06°47′43″E	5760	Ullensvang
Brakstad	60°32′36″N 05°07′21″E	5918	Alver
Brandasund	59°53′36″N 05°05′24″E	5423	Bømlo
Brandsøy	61°36′36″N 05°07′54″E	6900	Kinn
Brattholmen	60°20′57″N 05°09′28″E	5350	Øygarden
Breidvik	60°28′00″N 05°05′00″E	5310	Askøy
Breidvik	61°03′53″N 05°15′05″E	5961	Gulen
Breistein	60°29′00″N 05°24′00″E	5111	Bergen
Brekke	61°01′07″N 05°27′41″E	5961	Gulen
Brekkhus	60°44′00″N 06°09′00″E	5707	Voss
Bremanger	61°50′26″N 04°58′51″E	6727	Bremanger
Brossvika	61°04′10″N 05°08′40″E	5966	Gulen
Brotshaug	60°35′52″N 05°00′13″E	5917	Alver
Bruland	61°26′11″N 05°53′52″E	6800	Sunnfjord
Bruvik	60°28′00″N 05°39′00″E	5285	Osterøy
Bryggja	61°56′18″N 05°25′46″E	6711	Stad
Bu	60°28′00″N 06°51′00″E	5780	Eidfjord
Buavåg	59°35′49″N 05°19′32″E	5550	Sveio
Bulken	60°38′00″N 06°19′00″E	5700	Voss
Buneset	60°37′52″N 05°02′45″E	5936	Alver
Bygstad	61°22′29″N 05°38′30″E	6977	Sunnfjord
Byrkjeland	60°39′23″N 05°01′06″E	5936	Alver
Byrkjelo	61°43′55″N 06°30′31″E	6826	Gloppen
Byrknes	60°54′01″N 04°50′19″E	5970	Gulen
Byseim	60°33′00″N 05°28′00″E	5282	Osterøy
Bø	61°07′49″N 05°19′44″E	6953	Hyllestad
Bømoen	60°38′01″N 06°30′12″E	5700	Voss
Børve	60°16′00″N 06°38′00″E	5773	Ullensvang
Bøvågen	60°42′00″N 04°55′54″E	5937	Alver
Dalabygda	60°29′15″N 05°19′51″E	5131	Bergen
Dale	60°31′55″N 05°11′54″E	5918	Alver
Dale (Dalekvam)	60°35′00″N 05°49′00″E	5722	Vaksdal
Dale	61°21′47″N 05°23′53″E	6963	Fjaler
Dalegarden	60°34′52″N 05°47′37″E	5722	Vaksdal
Dalland	60°40′00″N 05°01′00″E	5936	Alver
Dalsøyra	60°55′58″N 05°08′08″E	5960	Gulen
Davanger	60°28′13″N 05°06′57″E	5310	Askøy
Davik	61°53′29″N 05°31′50″E	6730	Bremanger
Degnepoll	61°55′49″N 05°08′28″E	6718	Kinn
Dimmelsvik	59°57′00″N 05°59′00″E	5464	Kvinnherad
Dingja	61°01′29″N 05°03′14″E	5966	Gulen
Djønno	60°28′00″N 06°45′00″E	5734	Voss
Dombestein	61°53′21″N 05°38′33″E	6730	Bremanger
Dragsvik/Dragsviki	61°13′01″N 06°33′30″E	6898	Sogndal
Drange	60°11′37″N 05°21′18″E	5215	Bjørnafjorden
Drange	59°58′12″N 05°28′39″E	5685	Tysnes
Dyrdal	60°57′28″N 06°56′02″E	5748	Aurland
Ebbesvika	60°20′17″N 05°08′39″E	5350	Øygarden
Eide	61°10′19″N 05°23′00″E	6958	Hyllestad
Eidfjord	60°28′00″N 07°05′00″E	5783	Eidfjord
Eidslandet	60°44′00″N 05°45′00″E	5728	Vaksdal
Eidsnes	60°36′00″N 05°25′00″E	5913	Alver
Eidsvik	59°47′28″N 05°40′45″E	5455	Kvinnherad
Eidsvåg i Åsane	60°26′13″N 05°19′07″E	5104	Bergen
Eikanger	60°37′00″N 05°23′00″E	5913	Alver
Eikangervåg	60°36′18″N 05°23′53″E	5913	Alver
Eikedalen	60°23′25″N 05°54′26″E	5650	Samnanger
Eikefjord	61°35′04″N 05°27′29″E	6940	Kinn
Eikeland	60°33′03″N 05°02′28″E	5917	Alver
Eikelandsosen	60°14′22″N 05°45′14″E	5640	Bjørnafjorden
Eikevågen	60°30′00″N 05°03′05″E	5314	Askøy
Eimhjellen	61°38′41″N 05°48′50″E	6829	Gloppen
Eitrheim	60°06′00″N 06°32′00″E	5750	Ullensvang
Eivindvik	60°58′52″N 05°04′25″E	5966	Gulen
Eknes	60°36′00″N 05°27′00″E	5993	Alver
Ekra	60°17′47″N 05°02′24″E	5357	Øygarden
Egge	61°41′13″N 06°31′24″E	6826	Gloppen
Eltvik	62°11′07″N 05°13′53″E	6750	Stad
Erdal	60°26′38″N 05°13′30″E	5306	Askøy
Eri	61°04′03″N 07°30′01″E	6887	Lærdal
Ervik	60°26′29″N 05°19′17″E	5106	Bergen
Ervik	62°09′58″N 05°07′06″E	6750	Stad
Ese	61°12′56″N 06°29′22″E	6898	Sogndal
Espe, Norway	60°13′00″N 06°37′00″E	5773	Ullensvang
Espedal	61°16′05″N 05°19′30″E	6966	Fjaler
Espeland	60°23′00″N 05°28′00″E	5267	Bergen
Espevær	59°35′20″N 05°08′53″E	5444	Bømlo
Etnesjøen (Etne)	59°40′00″N 05°56′00″E	5590	Etne
Evanger	60°39′00″N 06°07′00″E	5707	Voss
Fanahammeren (Fana)	60°15′35″N 05°20′27″E	5244	Bergen
Fardal	61°11′30″N 07°01′23″E	6858	Sogndal
Fauskanger	60°30′37″N 05°02′10″E	5314	Askøy
Fedje	60°46′52″N 04°42′47″E	5947	Fedje
Feios	61°08′53″N 06°45′14″E	6895	Vik
Fet	61°21′49″N 07°15′48″E	6873	Luster
Fimreite	61°09′02″N 06°57′52″E	6856	Sogndal
Finse	60°36′00″N 07°30′00″E	5719	Ulvik
Fitjar	59°55′03″N 05°19′22″E	5419	Fitjar
Fjelberg	59°44′22″N 05°42′15″E	5459	Kvinnherad
Fjell	60°19′49″N 05°04′34″E	5357	Øygarden
Fjellgardane	60°06′17″N 06°00′50″E	5636	Kvinnherad
Fjellskålnes	60°34′00″N 05°27′00″E	5282	Osterøy
Fjæra	59°53′00″N 06°24′00″E	5598	Etne
Fjæreide	60°22′00″N 05°02′00″E	5353	Øygarden
Fjærland	61°24′08″N 06°44′19″E	6848	Sogndal
Flataråker	59°56′33″N 05°31′00″E	5687	Tysnes
Flatkvål	60°47′00″N 05°58′00″E	5728	Vaksdal
Flatraket	61°58′26″N 05°13′46″E	6717	Stad
Flekke	61°19′03″N 05°21′42″E	6968	Fjaler
Flesland	60°17′38″N 05°12′55″E	5258	Bergen
Flo	61°56′44″N 07°01′28″E	6783	Stryn
Florvåg	60°25′09″N 05°14′16″E	5305	Askøy
Fløksand	60°32′21″N 05°05′49″E	5918	Alver
Flåm	60°50′17″N 07°07′14″E	5743	Aurland
Folderøy (Foldrøyhamn)	59°47′50″N 05°18′06″E	5420	Bømlo
Foldnes	60°22′38″N 05°06′34″E	5353	Øygarden
Folkedal	60°30′00″N 06°39′00″E	5736	Voss
Follese	60°24′43″N 05°09′16″E	5303	Askøy
Fonnebostsjøen	60°45′36″N 05°10′47″E	5955	Alver
Fonnes	60°48′19″N 04°58′57″E	5953	Austrheim
Forland	60°11′00″N 05°06′00″E	5379	Øygarden
Fortun	61°29′42″N 07°41′19″E	6877	Luster
Fosse	60°17′00″N 06°03′00″E	5630	Kvam
Fossøy	61°33′00″N 07°17′43″E	6871	Luster
Fotlandsvåg	60°36′00″N 05°30′00″E	5283	Osterøy
Framfjord	61°00′19″N 06°24′45″E	6893	Vik
Frammarsvik	61°29′00″N 05°37′30″E	6817	Sunnfjord
Frekhaug	60°31′02″N 05°14′46″E	5918	Alver
Fresvik	61°04′21″N 06°56′04″E	6896	Vik
Frommereid	60°30′11″N 05°04′25″E	5314	Askøy
Frøland	60°22′48″N 05°48′28″E	5650	Samnanger
Frønningen	61°06′38″N 07°04′10″E	6855	Lærdal
Frøyset	60°51′52″N 05°12′50″E	5986	Masfjorden
Fusa	60°12′13″N 05°37′46″E	5641	Bjørnafjorden
Fykse	60°24′00″N 06°17′00″E	5612	Kvam
Fylingsneset	60°35′00″N 05°24′00″E	5913	Alver
Fyllingsdalen	60°21′41″N 05°17′48″E	5143	Bergen
Færavåg	59°59′00″N 05°27′00″E	5685	Tysnes
Færøyna	61°12′13″N 04°49′56″E	6929	Solund
Førde i Hordaland	59°36′32″N 05°27′58″E	5555	Sveio
Garnes	60°26′00″N 05°30′00″E	5264	Bergen
Gaupne	61°24′29″N 07°17′08″E	6868	Luster
Gimmestad	61°46′08″N 06°08′40″E	6823	Gloppen
Gjelsviki	60°41′00″N 05°25′00″E	5993	Alver
Gjerdviki	60°33′15″N 05°18′16″E	5914	Alver
Gjelsa	61°17′21″N 04°37′19″E	6987	Askvoll
Gjermundshamn	60°04′00″N 05°55′00″E	5635	Kvinnherad
Gjerde	61°37′56″N 07°15′46″E	6871	Luster
Gjetingsdalen	60°08′11″N 06°14′12″E	5476	Kvinnherad
Gjølanger	61°18′20″N 05°13′51″E	6967	Fjaler
Gjøvåg	60°03′19″N 05°21′44″E	5683	Tysnes
Glesvær	60°12′28″N 05°02′19″E	5381	Øygarden
Godøysund	60°04′00″N 05°34′00″E	5682	Tysnes
Gossland	60°36′29″N 06°20′37″E	5700	Voss
Granvin	60°33′00″N 06°43′00″E	5736	Voss
Gravdal	59°47′00″N 05°47′00″E	5457	Kvinnherad
Grimo	60°24′00″N 06°39′00″E	5777	Ullensvang
Grimstad	60°19′06″N 05°14′26″E	5251	Bergen
Grinde	61°11′06″N 06°44′23″E	6863	Sogndal
Grindeim	60°40′43″N 04°59′08″E	5936	Alver
Grotle	61°50′22″N 04°54′13″E	6727	Bremanger
Grov	61°36′54″N 05°19′20″E	6900	Kinn
Grov	59°50′39″N 05°31′16″E	5414	Stord
Grytøyra	61°17′11″N 05°01′31″E	6967	Fjaler
Guddal	61°14′46″N 05°31′48″E	6966	Fjaler
Gudvangen	60°52′43″N 06°50′19″E	5747	Aurland
Gunnegjerd	59°40′00″N 06°03′57″E	5590	Etne
Hafslo	61°18′55″N 07°12′03″E	6869	Luster
Haga	60°23′16″N 05°46′14″E	5650	Samnanger
Haganes	60°16′47″N 05°06′38″E	5357	Øygarden
Hagavik	60°11′00″N 05°26′00″E	5217	Bjørnafjorden
Haljem	60°08′48″N 05°26′17″E	5200	Bjørnafjorden
Halland	60°38′56″N 05°04′40″E	5936	Alver
Hammarsland	60°15′09″N 05°04′24″E	5382	Øygarden
Hamnen	61°18′50″N 04°43′54″E	6986	Askvoll
Hamre	60°32′39″N 05°21′45″E	5281	Osterøy
Hamre	60°12′31″N 05°04′49″E	5379	Øygarden
Hanevik	60°29′39″N 05°09′08″E	5307	Askøy
Hanøyni	60°26′37″N 05°04′33″E	5310	Askøy
Hardbakke	61°04′16″N 04°50′13″E	6924	Solund
Harkestad	60°35′10″N 04°50′30″E	5336	Øygarden
Hatlestrand	60°02′00″N 05°54′00″E	5635	Kvinnherad
Hattvik	60°12′22″N 05°32′03″E	5200	Bjørnafjorden
Hauge	60°42′26″N 05°11′58″E	5957	Alver
Hauge	59°43′00″N 05°31′00″E	5554	Sveio
Haugen	61°55′27″N 05°53′05″E	6770	Stad
Haugland	60°30′48″N 05°05′06″E	5314	Askøy
Haugland	60°41′52″N 04°56′08″E	5937	Alver
Hauglandshella	60°26′45″N 05°09′19″E	5310	Askøy
Haugo	60°36′17″N 05°32′38″E	5281	Osterøy
Haugstad	60°39′26″N 05°05′20″E	5936	Alver
Haugsvær	60°54′00″N 05°32′00″E	5983	Masfjorden
Haukanes	60°05′00″N 05°16′00″E	5392	Austevoll
Haukedalen	61°25′15″N 06°22′37″E	6818	Sunnfjord
Haukeland	60°21′48″N 05°27′05″E	5268	Bergen
Haus	60°27′11″N 05°29′45″E	5286	Osterøy
Havrå	60°26′22″N 05°34′31″E	5286	Osterøy
Heggjabygda	61°56′05″N 06°16′00″E	6770	Stad
Helgheim	61°33′41″N 06°24′04″E	6843	Sunnfjord
Hella	60°39′48″N 04°58′54″E	5936	Alver
Helland	60°40′05″N 05°01′31″E	5936	Alver
Helle	61°19′50″N 05°07′56″E	6986	Askvoll
Helle	61°27′54″N 05°32′46″E	6817	Sunnfjord
Helle	60°34′00″N 05°46′00″E	5722	Vaksdal
Hellesundet	60°39′38″N 04°48′18″E	5334	Øygarden
Hellesøyni	60°39′37″N 04°47′22″E	5334	Øygarden
Hellevik	61°17′59″N 05°10′15″E	6967	Fjaler
Hennebygda	61°51′44″N 06°13′23″E	6770	Stad
Herand	60°21′00″N 06°24′00″E	5628	Ullensvang
Herdleværet	60°34′02″N 04°48′46″E	5337	Øygarden
Herdlo	60°34′00″N 04°57′00″E	5315	Askøy
Hermansverk	61°11′04″N 06°51′00″E	6863	Sogndal
Hernar	60°41′20″N 04°44′47″E	5335	Øygarden
Hersvikbygda	61°10′22″N 04°53′45″E	6929	Solund
Herøysund	59°55′02″N 05°47′22″E	5462	Kvinnherad
Hest	61°04′03″N 05°48′16″E	5962	Høyanger
Hestad	61°22′48″N 05°29′44″E	6973	Sunnfjord
Hestenesøyra	61°50′21″N 06°00′13″E	6828	Gloppen
Hetlevik	60°25′37″N 05°09′08″E	5304	Askøy
Hindnes	60°40′07″N 05°22′50″E	5993	Alver
Hjartås	60°31′47″N 05°08′49″E	5918	Alver
Hjelle	61°54′52″N 07°06′55″E	6798	Stryn
Hjellestad	60°15′23″N 05°15′05″E	5259	Bergen
Hjellviki	60°33′00″N 05°25′00″E	5281	Osterøy
Hjelmo	60°38′51″N 04°49′21″E	5334	Øygarden
Hjelmåsen	60°36′00″N 05°22′00″E	5915	Alver
Hjønnevåg	61°02′24″N 04°39′48″E	6928	Solund
Hoddevika	62°07′22″N 05°10′12″E	6750	Stad
Hodneland	60°43′51″N 05°17′59″E	5957	Alver
Holdhus	60°14′00″N 05°50′00″E	5640	Bjørnafjorden
Holme	60°31′42″N 05°09′16″E	5918	Alver
Holmedal	61°21′31″N 05°11′04″E	6982	Askvoll
Holmefjord	60°17′09″N 05°40′16″E	5642	Bjørnafjorden
Holmøyane	61°56′15″N 06°26′07″E	6779	Stad
Holsen	61°25′05″N 06°09′31″E	6819	Sunnfjord
Holvik	61°55′44″N 05°04′53″E	6700	Kinn
Honningsvåg	62°11′36″N 05°12′26″E	6750	Stad
Hopland	60°45′17″N 04°54′58″E	5943	Austrheim
Hopland	61°52′01″N 06°18′52″E	6796	Stryn
Horda	59°48′41″N 06°45′56″E	5760	Ullensvang
Hordvik	60°31′06″N 05°17′59″E	5108	Bergen
Hosanger	60°34′30″N 05°28′39″E	5282	Osterøy
Hosteland	60°51′00″N 05°15′00″E	5986	Masfjorden
Hovland	60°11′00″N 05°25′00″E	5217	Bjørnafjorden
Hovland	60°00′46″N 05°41′42″E	5694	Tysnes
Hovland	60°14′00″N 06°38′00″E	5773	Ullensvang
Hovlandsdal	61°13′58″N 05°25′59″E	6966	Fjaler
Humlevik	60°03′05″N 05°37′16″E	5690	Tysnes
Hundeidet	61°53′47″N 05°51′55″E	6770	Stad
Hundven	60°40′36″N 05°13′09″E	5956	Alver
Husa	60°01′02″N 05°49′06″E	5637	Kvinnherad
Husavik	60°01′07″N 05°16′53″E	5396	Austevoll
Husebø	60°36′14″N 04°59′33″E	5917	Alver
Husevåg	61°54′55″N 05°02′14″E	6716	Kinn
Husnes	59°51′49″N 05°44′43″E	5460	Kvinnherad
Hyen	61°44′21″N 05°55′05″E	6829	Gloppen
Hylkje	60°30′37″N 05°21′16″E	5109	Bergen
Hyllestad	61°10′15″N 05°17′45″E	6957	Hyllestad
Hærland	61°21′08″N 04°53′28″E	6985	Askvoll
Høyanger	61°13′13″N 06°04′29″E	6993	Høyanger
Høyheimsvik	61°24′01″N 07°23′49″E	6875	Luster
Høylandsbygda	59°47′00″N 05°47′56″E	5457	Kvinnherad
Håfoss	59°40′18″N 05°59′54″E	5590	Etne
Håland	60°40′27″N 04°57′32″E	5936	Alver
Håpoldo	60°33′21″N 04°58′24″E	5315	Askøy
Håra	59°49′00″N 06°47′00″E	5760	Ullensvang
Håvik	61°57′31″N 05°16′14″E	6717	Stad
Ikjen	61°03′33″N 05°39′21″E	5962	Høyanger
Indre Arna	60°25′29″N 05°28′35″E	5261	Bergen
Indre Hafslo	61°21′48″N 07°15′55″E	6873	Luster
Indre Matre	59°51′32″N 05°59′35″E	5498	Kvinnherad
Indre Offerdal	61°12′32″N 07°31′56″E	6885	Årdal
Indre Oppedal	61°03′47″N 05°33′24″E	5961	Gulen
Indre Ålvik	60°26′00″N 06°26′00″E	5614	Kvam
Indrevevring	61°29′31″N 05°24′23″E	6817	Sunnfjord
Innsylta	60°42′51″N 04°55′23″E	5937	Alver
Innvik	61°51′06″N 06°37′00″E	6793	Stryn
Innvær	59°48′00″N 05°15′00″E	5420	Bømlo
Instebø	60°41′12″N 05°03′32″E	5939	Alver
Instefjord	60°59′09″N 05°29′05″E	5961	Gulen
Io	60°33′38″N 05°01′16″E	5917	Alver
Isane	61°52′36″N 05°42′52″E	6737	Bremanger
Isdalstø	60°33′20″N 05°16′09″E	5914	Alver
Jondal	60°17′00″N 06°17′00″E	5627	Ullensvang
Jostedal	61°35′14″N 07°16′59″E	6871	Luster
Kaland	60°47′57″N 04°59′44″E	5953	Austrheim
Kaland	60°16′32″N 05°25′02″E	5229	Bergen
Kalandseid	60°16′03″N 05°25′48″E	5229	Bergen
Kalavåg	59°36′00″N 05°12′00″E	5443	Bømlo
Kalvåg	61°45′58″N 04°52′30″E	6729	Bremanger
Kallestad	60°16′23″N 05°03′39″E	5382	Øygarden
Kandal	61°40′20″N 06°22′46″E	6823	Gloppen
Kaupanger	61°11′04″N 07°14′32″E	6854	Sogndal
Kausland	60°13′26″N 05°02′54″E	5381	Øygarden
Kinn	61°33′40″N 04°46′09″E	6912	Kinn
Kinsarvik	60°22′32″N 06°43′10″E	5780	Ullensvang
Kinsedal	61°17′07″N 07°23′53″E	6986	Luster
Kjøkkelvik	60°23′26″N 05°13′53″E	5178	Bergen
Kjølsdalen	61°55′01″N 05°37′54″E	6776	Stad
Kjørnes	61°12′38″N 07°07′16″E	6856	Sogndal
Klakegg	61°36′35″N 06°31′41″E	6843	Sunnfjord
Kleppe	60°11′21″N 05°08′52″E	5378	Øygarden
Kleppestø	60°24′34″N 05°13′43″E	5300	Askøy
Klokkarvik	60°13′21″N 05°09′20″E	5378	Øygarden
Knappskog	60°22′55″N 05°03′21″E	5353	Øygarden
Knarrevik	60°22′24″N 05°09′27″E	5355	Øygarden
Knarrviki (Knarvik)	60°32′32″N 05°17′18″E	5914	Alver
Kokstad	60°17′56″N 05°15′47″E	5257	Bergen
Kolavåg	60°27′06″N 05°07′26″E	5310	Askøy
Kolbeinsvik	60°02′27″N 05°12′08″E	5394	Austevoll
Kolgrov	61°00′25″N 04°40′10″E	6928	Solund
Kolltveit	60°21′29″N 05°04′55″E	5353	Øygarden
Koløyhamn	59°51′26″N 05°18′33″E	5419	Fitjar
Korssund	61°15′15″N 04°59′40″E	6964	Fjaler
Krakhella	61°07′48″N 05°00′57″E	6926	Solund
Krokeide	60°13′35″N 05°18′05″E	5244	Bergen
Kroken	61°20′58″N 07°23′47″E	6876	Luster
Krossneset	60°31′50″N 05°15′24″E	5918	Alver
Kråkeneset	62°01′37″N 04°59′37″E	6710	Kinn
Kulen	61°55′49″N 05°07′46″E	6718	Kinn
Kvaleim	60°41′17″N 04°56′13″E	5937	Alver
Kvalheim	61°59′22″N 05°02′40″E	6710	Kinn
Kvalvåg	60°00′36″N 05°04′55″E	5398	Austevoll
Kvalvågen	60°42′00″N 05°10′00″E	5956	Alver
Kvamme	60°35′11″N 05°14′17″E	5911	Alver
Kvamme	61°07′27″N 06°27′58″E	6899	Sogndal
Kvammen	61°27′55″N 05°25′09″E	6983	Askvoll
Kvamsøy	61°07′43″N 06°29′04″E	6898	Sogndal
Kvanndal	60°29′00″N 06°36′00″E	5736	Voss
Kvitheim	60°39′37″N 06°27′14″E	5710	Voss
Kyrkjebø	61°09′49″N 05°53′59″E	6995	Høyanger
Kyrping	59°45′00″N 06°07′00″E	5590	Etne
Kysnesstranda	60°12′15″N 06°06′49″E	5626	Ullensvang
Kårbø	60°36′19″N 05°01′36″E	5917	Alver
Kårtveit	60°23′17″N 04°59′24″E	5363	Øygarden
Laksevåg	60°23′06″N 05°17′55″E	5164	Bergen
Landro	60°25′19″N 04°57′41″E	5363	Øygarden
Landsvik	60°36′11″N 05°03′12″E	5917	Alver
Langeneset	62°00′39″N 05°08′18″E	6710	Kinn
Langevåg	59°36′03″N 05°12′55″E	5443	Bømlo
Langhaugane	61°28′51″N 06°03′45″E	6847	Sunnfjord
Lauvås	60°46′06″N 05°06′04″E	5955	Alver
Lavik	60°26′14″N 05°10′39″E	5300	Askøy
Lavik	61°06′15″N 05°30′06″E	6947	Høyanger
Leknes	60°34′00″N 05°23′00″E	5915	Alver
Leikanger	61°11′08″N 06°48′28″E	6863	Sogndal
Leikanger	62°07′10″N 05°18′56″E	6750	Stad
Leirvik i Sogn	61°08′13″N 05°20′52″E	6953	Hyllestad
Lepsøy	60°09′00″N 05°24′00″E	5216	Bjørnafjorden
Li	60°18′19″N 05°07′42″E	5353	Øygarden
Lindås	60°44′17″N 05°09′36″E	5955	Alver
Litlabø	59°48′00″N 05°27′00″E	5415	Stord
Litlebergen	60°32′28″N 05°14′11″E	5918	Alver
Litlelindås	60°44′39″N 04°58′18″E	5943	Austrheim
Litlås	60°47′42″N 05°01′10″E	5953	Austrheim
Ljøsne	61°02′57″N 07°36′01″E	6887	Lærdal
Loddefjord	60°22′15″N 05°14′04″E	5178	Bergen
Loen	61°52′14″N 06°51′25″E	6789	Stryn
Lofthus	60°20′00″N 06°40′00″E	5781	Ullensvang
Lonevåg	60°31′50″N 05°30′00″E	5282	Osterøy
Losnegard	61°07′19″N 05°05′32″E	6926	Solund
Lote	61°52′02″N 06°04′47″E	6778	Stad
Lunde	60°38′03″N 05°07′32″E	5938	Alver
Lundegrend	60°03′35″N 05°38′32″E	5690	Tysnes
Luro	60°41′49″N 05°05′54″E	5912	Alver
Luster	61°26′41″N 07°27′29″E	6872	Luster
Lykling	59°41′58″N 05°10′47″E	5437	Bømlo
Lyngstranda	60°04′00″N 06°03′00″E	5474	Kvinnherad
Lærdalsøyri	61°05′52″N 07°28′53″E	6887	Lærdal
Løfallsstranda	60°00′54″N 05°59′57″E	5474	Kvinnherad
Løkjastranda	61°54′51″N 05°51′56″E	6770	Stad
Løyningdalen	60°16′06″N 05°33′35″E	5200	Bjørnafjorden
Låne	61°11′21″N 06°13′47″E	6898	Sogndal
Låvi	60°52′37″N 07°15′07″E	5745	Aurland
Manger	60°38′30″N 05°02′21″E	5936	Alver
Marifjøra	61°22′55″N 07°18′12″E	6873	Luster
Marikoven	60°23′42″N 05°10′28″E	5302	Askøy
Markhus	59°49′00″N 06°14′00″E	5596	Etne
Masfjordnes	60°48′00″N 05°18′00″E	5981	Masfjorden
Mastrevikane	60°47′20″N 04°56′15″E	5943	Austrheim
Matersdalen	59°51′32″N 06°00′55″E	5498	Kvinnherad
Mathopen	60°20′27″N 05°13′30″E	5174	Bergen
Matre	60°52′00″N 05°35′00″E	5984	Masfjorden
Maurstad	61°56′37″N 05°28′05″E	6711	Stad
Mehus	59°46′00″N 05°08′00″E	5430	Bømlo
Meland	60°32′25″N 05°11′15″E	5918	Alver
Meling	59°47′00″N 05°07′42″E	5430	Bømlo
Merkesviki	60°32′45″N 04°58′53″E	5315	Askøy
Midtgulen	61°44′24″N 05°09′47″E	6723	Bremanger
Milde	60°15′07″N 05°16′05″E	5259	Bergen
Misje	60°27′05″N 04°57′57″E	5363	Øygarden
Mjelde	61°06′13″N 07°30′53″E	6887	Lærdal
Mjølkeråen	60°29′27″N 05°16′03″E	5137	Bergen
Mjømna	60°55′04″N 04°54′16″E	5978	Gulen
Mjøs	60°42′36″N 04°58′46″E	5939	Alver
Mo (Modalen)	60°49′00″N 05°48′00″E	5729	Modalen
Mogrenda	61°55′04″N 06°04′57″E	6770	Stad
Moldekleiv	60°32′48″N 05°12′53″E	5918	Alver
Molvikagrendi	60°37′57″N 05°33′26″E	5993	Alver
Mongstad	60°47′39″N 05°04′01″E	5954	Alver
Mortveit	59°44′00″N 05°52′00″E	5593	Etne
Morvik	60°28′16″N 05°16′32″E	5122	Bergen
Moster	59°41′53″N 05°21′37″E	5440	Bømlo
Mosterhamn	59°42′00″N 05°23′00″E	5440	Bømlo
Mundheim	60°10′00″N 05°55′00″E	5632	Kvam
Myking	60°42′06″N 05°19′38″E	5957	Alver
Myklebust	61°43′17″N 05°11′20″E	6723	Bremanger
Myklebust	61°31′18″N 06°20′54″E	6847	Sunnfjord
Myklemyr	61°31′13″N 07°15′57″E	6871	Luster
Myrdal	60°44′07″N 07°07′22″E	5718	Aurland
Myrkdalen	60°50′31″N 06°27′59″E	5713	Voss
Møkster	60°04′03″N 05°05′41″E	5387	Austevoll
Mønshaugen/Bjørgo	60°38′00″N 06°32′00″E	5700	Voss
Møvik	60°19′25″N 05°00′42″E	5357	Øygarden
Måren	61°08′57″N 06°04′27″E	6995	Høyanger
Naddvik	61°11′32″N 07°37′08″E	6885	Årdal
Namntveit	60°38′19″N 05°06′51″E	5936	Alver
Naustdal	61°30′32″N 05°43′00″E	6817	Sunnfjord
Nautnes	60°37′32″N 04°48′07″E	5336	Øygarden
Nedre Romslo	60°25′00″N 05°34′00″E	5263	Bergen
Nedre Vinjo	60°48′00″N 06°31′00″E	5713	Voss
Nedstryn	61°55′07″N 06°47′00″E	6783	Stryn
Nes	61°23′12″N 07°22′03″E	6875	Luster
Nese	60°18′12″N 05°02′12″E	5357	Øygarden
Neset	60°38′39″N 05°14′06″E	5912	Alver
Nesheim	60°48′00″N 06°09′00″E	5728	Vaksdal
Nessane	61°08′02″N 06°16′50″E	6898	Sogndal
Nesttun	60°19′02″N 05°21′29″E	5227	Bergen
Noranger	60°42′20″N 04°59′16″E	5939	Alver
Nord-Huglo	59°51′55″N 05°33′36″E	5497	Stord
Nordbygda	60°24′49″N 05°43′55″E	5652	Samnanger
Norddal	61°38′28″N 05°22′43″E	6900	Kinn
Nordfjordeid	61°54′22″N 05°59′29″E	6770	Stad
Nordgulen	61°00′24″N 05°11′32″E	5966	Gulen
Nordnes	60°12′14″N 06°33′55″E	5776	Ullensvang
Nordrevik	61°09′46″N 05°43′11″E	6996	Høyanger
Nordsida	61°51′05″N 06°31′14″E	6795	Stryn
Nordrekvingo	60°45′00″N 05°22′00″E	5981	Masfjorden
Nordrepollen	60°09′55″N 06°17′34″E	5476	Kvinnherad
Nordstrøno	60°10′00″N 05°21′00″E	5218	Bjørnafjorden
Nordtveitgrend	60°05′57″N 05°44′18″E	5646	Bjørnafjorden
Nordvik	60°13′58″N 05°22′00″E	5243	Bergen
Norheimsund	60°22′00″N 06°08′00″E	5600	Kvam
Nornes	61°09′37″N 06°59′06″E	6859	Sogndal
Nyborg	60°28′06″N 05°20′08″E	5131	Bergen
Nygård	61°55′09″N 05°11′01″E	6718	Kinn
Nyhammaren (Nyhamar)	61°00′12″N 05°00′13″E	5966	Gulen
Nyttingnes	61°35′42″N 05°13′00″E	6940	Kinn
Nøttveit	60°38′26″N 05°03′45″E	5936	Alver
Okshola	61°55′02″N 05°08′59″E	6718	Kinn
Olden	61°50′01″N 06°48′33″E	6788	Stryn
Omastranda	60°14′00″N 05°58′00″E	5632	Kvam
Onarheim	59°56′51″N 05°37′28″E	5694	Tysnes
Ongeltveit	60°24′38″N 04°59′02″E	5363	Øygarden
Ongeltveitsjøen	60°24′18″N 04°58′15″E	5363	Øygarden
Oni	60°34′10″N 04°51′40″E	5337	Øygarden
Oppstryn	61°54′38″N 07°03′17″E	6799	Stryn
Ornes (Urnes)	61°17′58″N 07°18′53″E	6870	Luster
Orradalen	59°51′37″N 06°00′57″E	5498	Kvinnherad
Ortnevik	61°06′41″N 06°07′51″E	5962	Høyanger
Osa	60°35′20″N 07°02′07″E	5730	Ulvik
Osland	61°04′21″N 05°47′59″E	5962	Høyanger
Osmundsvåg	61°59′11″N 05°11′13″E	6718	Kinn
Ostereidet	60°37′23″N 05°28′42″E	5993	Alver
Osøyro	60°11′00″N 05°28′00″E	5200	Bjørnafjorden
Raknes	60°33′00″N 05°26′00″E	5281	Osterøy
Ramnanger	60°28′00″N 05°09′00″E	5310	Askøy
Ramsøyni	60°26′00″N 05°03′00″E	5310	Askøy
Randabygda	61°52′02″N 06°19′36″E	6796	Stryn
Raudeberg	61°58′50″N 05°08′01″E	6710	Kinn
Re (Breim)	61°44′14″N 06°24′34″E	6827	Gloppen
Redalsgrend	61°29′27″N 05°30′16″E	6817	Sunnfjord
Rebnor	60°47′10″N 04°52′01″E	5943	Austrheim
Refvika	61°59′54″N 05°05′26″E	6710	Kinn
Reimegrend	60°40′52″N 06°44′29″E	5700	Voss
Reisa	60°00′41″N 05°30′18″E	5685	Tysnes
Reksteren	60°02′23″N 05°25′59″E	5683	Tysnes
Revnestrand	60°09′00″N 05°44′00″E	5647	Bjørnafjorden
Ringøy	60°26′00″N 06°47′00″E	5780	Ullensvang
Risasjøen	60°45′29″N 05°03′38″E	5955	Alver
Rognaldsvåg	61°33′53″N 04°47′35″E	6915	Kinn
Rolvsnes	59°52′10″N 05°10′05″E	5420	Bømlo
Romarheim	60°44′00″N 05°39′00″E	5994	Alver
Rommetveit	59°48′59″N 05°31′31″E	5414	Stord
Rong	60°30′48″N 04°54′12″E	5337	Øygarden
Rongesundet	60°29′58″N 04°55′42″E	5337	Øygarden
Rosendal	59°59′00″N 06°01′00″E	5470	Kvinnherad
Rossland	60°34′03″N 05°03′12″E	5917	Alver
Rossnes	60°45′23″N 05°07′40″E	5955	Alver
Rossneset	60°44′38″N 04°53′54″E	5937	Alver
Rostøy	60°05′00″N 05°13′00″E	5394	Austevoll
Rubbestadneset	59°48′53″N 05°16′05″E	5420	Bømlo
Rugsund	61°53′16″N 05°19′52″E	6734	Bremanger
Rutledal	61°04′02″N 05°11′08″E	5966	Gulen
Ryland	60°33′28″N 05°03′07″E	5917	Alver
Røldal	59°49′00″N 06°48′00″E	5760	Ullensvang
Rørdal	61°00′44″N 04°41′50″E	6928	Solund
Røyrvik	60°15′00″N 06°07′00″E	5620	Kvam
Røyrvikvåg	59°51′00″N 05°42′00″E	5450	Kvinnherad
Sagvåg	59°46′43″N 05°23′46″E	5410	Stord
Sakseid	59°44′49″N 05°14′18″E	5437	Bømlo
Sakstad	60°31′35″N 05°12′19″E	5918	Alver
Salbu	61°13′24″N 05°12′08″E	6958	Hyllestad
Salhus	60°30′25″N 05°16′10″E	5107	Bergen
Samnøya	60°15′40″N 05°37′30″E	5642	Bjørnafjorden
Sandane	61°46′21″N 06°12′53″E	6823	Gloppen
Sanddal	61°30′29″N 06°16′11″E	6847	Sunnfjord
Sande	61°19′30″N 05°47′51″E	6973	Sunnfjord
Sandvoll	59°48′34″N 05°48′46″E	5452	Kvinnherad
Seim	60°37′16″N 05°16′09″E	5912	Alver
Seimsdalen	61°14′27″N 07°39′11″E	6885	Årdal
Seimsfoss	59°57′53″N 05°59′46″E	5472	Kvinnherad
Selje	62°02′45″N 05°21′03″E	6740	Stad
Sekkingstad	60°21′15″N 04°59′10″E	5357	Øygarden
Sekse	60°15′00″N 06°38′00″E	5773	Ullensvang
Sele	60°38′00″N 04°48′00″E	5334	Øygarden
Selevoll	60°36′31″N 05°12′46″E	5911	Alver
Seljestad	59°54′00″N 06°39′00″E	5763	Ullensvang
Selsvik	60°18′00″N 06°17′00″E	5627	Ullensvang
Siggjarvågen	59°45′58″N 05°19′13″E	5428	Bømlo
Silda	62°00′45″N 05°11′20″E	6714	Kinn
Skansen	60°33′40″N 04°57′53″E	5315	Askøy
Skare (Skarde)	59°56′00″N 06°36′00″E	5763	Ullensvang
Skarpeneset	60°33′19″N 05°12′47″E	5918	Alver
Skei	61°34′19″N 06°28′53″E	6843	Sunnfjord
Skilbrei	61°22′53″N 05°49′04″E	6975	Sunnfjord
Skjeljanger	60°36′07″N 04°57′56″E	5917	Alver
Skjelvik	60°42′02″N 05°02′26″E	5939	Alver
Skjelviki	60°30′23″N 05°08′24″E	5307	Askøy
Skjerdal	60°56′59″N 07°11′27″E	5745	Aurland
Skjold	60°18′10″N 05°21′05″E	5222	Bergen
Skjolden	61°29′25″N 07°36′02″E	6876	Luster
Skoge	60°16′04″N 05°05′16″E	5382	Øygarden
Skogsvåg	60°15′18″N 05°06′05″E	5382	Øygarden
Skorpa	61°35′13″N 04°48′44″E	6918	Kinn
Skråmestøi	60°31′56″N 05°04′40″E	5314	Askøy
Skurtveit	60°34′18″N 05°02′29″E	5917	Alver
Skålvik	60°20′24″N 05°01′20″E	5357	Øygarden
Skånevik	59°43′58″N 05°56′15″E	5593	Etne
Sletta	60°41′19″N 05°02′42″E	5939	Alver
Slinda	61°09′40″N 06°55′39″E	6859	Sogndal
Snilstveit	59°58′36″N 05°57′21″E	5473	Kvinnherad
Sogndalsfjøra	61°13′32″N 07°06′06″E	6856	Sogndal
Solheim	60°53′17″N 05°28′17″E	5983	Masfjorden
Sollsvika	60°26′12″N 04°58′07″E	5363	Øygarden
Soltveit	60°42′14″N 05°00′17″E	5939	Alver
Solvorn	61°18′03″N 07°14′43″E	6879	Luster
Spjeld	60°23′27″N 05°02′17″E	5363	Øygarden
Stalheim	60°50′10″N 06°40′47″E	5715	Voss
Stamneshella	60°40′00″N 05°45′00″E	5727	Vaksdal
Stanghelle	60°33′00″N 05°44′00″E	5724	Vaksdal
Stavang	61°32′07″N 05°11′13″E	6944	Kinn
Steine	60°22′00″N 06°05′00″E	5600	Kvam
Steinhovden	61°34′18″N 05°18′16″E	6940	Kinn
Steinklepp	61°04′55″N 07°51′14″E	6888	Lærdal
Steinsland	60°12′08″N 05°05′17″E	5379	Øygarden
Stongfjorden	61°25′43″N 05°10′14″E	6984	Askvoll
Storebø	60°06′00″N 05°14′00″E	5392	Austevoll
Stormark	60°45′22″N 04°44′15″E	5947	Fedje
Strandebarm (Ploganes)	60°17′00″N 06°01′00″E	5630	Kvam
Strandvik	60°09′34″N 05°40′00″E	5643	Bjørnafjorden
Straume	60°21′40″N 05°07′19″E	5353	Øygarden
Straume	60°39′00″N 05°49′00″E	5727	Vaksdal
Strusshamn	60°24′16″N 05°11′27″E	5302	Askøy
Stryn	61°54′16″N 06°43′21″E	6783	Stryn
Stura	60°37′17″N 04°50′16″E	5336	Øygarden
Stårheim	61°55′11″N 05°45′29″E	6777	Stad
Sunde	61°25′42″N 05°55′53″E	6800	Sunnfjord
Sunde i Matre	59°47′43″N 05°57′48″E	5498	Kvinnherad
Sunde i Sunnhordland	59°50′22″N 05°43′10″E	5450	Kvinnherad
Sundsbø	60°46′09″N 05°09′05″E	5955	Alver
Sundve	60°47′16″N 06°29′33″E	5713	Voss
Sunndal	60°07′00″N 06°17′00″E	5476	Kvinnherad
Svanøy	61°29′37″N 05°07′52″E	6914	Kinn
Sveio	59°32′41″N 05°20′57″E	5550	Sveio
Svelgen	61°46′06″N 05°17′43″E	6723	Bremanger
Svortevik	61°30′14″N 05°14′35″E	6942	Kinn
Svortland	59°47′43″N 05°10′31″E	5430	Bømlo
Svåsand	60°19′00″N 06°20′00″E	5627	Ullensvang
Sygna	61°20′51″N 05°43′14″E	6973	Sunnfjord
Sylta	60°43′06″N 04°55′02″E	5937	Alver
Sæbø (Sæbøvågen)	60°36′47″N 05°09′04″E	5938	Alver
Sæbøvik	59°47′51″N 05°42′53″E	5454	Kvinnherad
Sætre	60°35′38″N 04°59′27″E	5917	Alver
Sævareid	60°11′11″N 05°46′28″E	5645	Bjørnafjorden
Sævrås	60°44′02″N 05°16′24″E	5957	Alver
Søfteland	60°14′15″N 05°26′54″E	5212	Bjørnafjorden
Sørbøvågen	61°13′37″N 05°10′51″E	6958	Hyllestad
Søre Sæle	60°31′53″N 04°53′39″E	5337	Øygarden
Søre Øyane	60°08′40″N 05°22′37″E	5216	Bjørnafjorden
Søreide	61°05′44″N 05°52′59″E	5962	Høyanger
Sørheim	61°25′18″N 07°29′30″E	6876	Luster
Sør-Huglo	59°50′00″N 05°36′00″E	5497	Stord
Sørbygda	59°39′09″N 05°58′53″E	5590	Etne
Søreidgrenda	60°18′41″N 05°16′23″E	5251	Bergen
Sørekvingo	60°44′00″N 05°24′00″E	5981	Masfjorden
Sørstranda	59°38′22″N 05°52′58″E	5590	Etne
Sørstrøno	60°10′00″N 05°22′00″E	5217	Bjørnafjorden
Søvik	60°12′58″N 05°23′14″E	5215	Bjørnafjorden
Takle	61°01′30″N 05°22′19″E	5961	Gulen
Tangerås	60°15′22″N 06°00′26″E	5630	Kvam
Tansøyna	61°29′37″N 04°57′57″E	6919	Kinn
Tellnes	60°17′13″N 05°05′21″E	5357	Øygarden
Tellvik	60°30′52″N 05°17′29″E	5108	Bergen
Tennebø	61°55′00″N 05°09′36″E	6718	Kinn
Tertnes	60°27′20″N 05°17′32″E	5114	Bergen
Tjeldstø	60°35′53″N 04°50′46″E	5336	Øygarden
Tjernagel	59°37′28″N 05°20′13″E	5550	Sveio
Tjukkebygdi	60°39′00″N 06°30′00″E	5700	Voss
Tjugum	61°12′55″N 06°32′47″E	6898	Sogndal
Tofta	60°12′11″N 05°03′35″E	5379	Øygarden
Toftevågen	60°28′41″N 04°56′28″E	5337	Øygarden
Tokheim	60°05′00″N 06°32′00″E	5750	Ullensvang
Toranger (Torangsvåg)	60°07′00″N 05°09′00″E	5384	Austevoll
Torsnes	60°14′11″N 06°11′42″E	5627	Ullensvang
Torsteinsvik	60°29′30″N 04°56′17″E	5337	Øygarden
Torvika	61°55′16″N 05°47′49″E	6777	Stad
Toska	60°38′33″N 04°58′06″E	5936	Alver
Totland	61°55′57″N 05°23′24″E	6711	Stad
Trellevika	60°11′01″N 05°02′46″E	5379	Øygarden
Trengereid	60°25′58″N 05°38′13″E	5263	Bergen
Trengereid	60°16′46″N 05°02′15″E	5382	Øygarden
Tronteigen	61°19′22″N 07°49′47″E	6884	Årdal
Trovåg	61°00′09″N 04°43′18″E	6928	Solund
Trædet	60°30′28″N 05°04′55″E	5314	Askøy
Trælland	60°41′55″N 05°12′04″E	5956	Alver
Tunes	60°25′00″N 05°30′00″E	5264	Bergen
Tungesvik	59°44′00″N 06°02′00″E	5593	Etne
Turøyna	60°26′58″N 04°55′22″E	5365	Øygarden
Tveitevåg	60°26′48″N 05°08′10″E	5310	Askøy
Tysse	60°22′15″N 05°45′22″E	5650	Samnanger
Tyssedal	60°07′00″N 06°34′00″E	5770	Ullensvang
Tysso	60°37′00″N 05°35′00″E	5284	Osterøy
Tytingvågen	61°53′56″N 05°05′18″E	6700	Kinn
Tælavåg	60°15′33″N 04°59′09″E	5380	Øygarden
Tønjum	61°03′30″N 07°31′06″E	6887	Lærdal
Tørvikbygd	60°18′00″N 06°10′00″E	5620	Kvam
Uggdal	60°00′22″N 05°31′26″E	5685	Tysnes
Uggdalseidet	59°59′51″N 05°29′41″E	5685	Tysnes
Ulsetåsen	60°27′38″N 05°18′29″E	5115	Bergen
Ulven	60°12′03″N 05°25′41″E	5200	Bjørnafjorden
Ulveset	60°19′34″N 05°02′45″E	5357	Øygarden
Ulvik	60°34′00″N 06°54′00″E	5730	Ulvik
Undredal	60°56′58″N 07°06′10″E	5746	Aurland
Urang	59°48′16″N 05°10′16″E	5427	Bømlo
Uskedal	59°55′48″N 05°51′34″E	5463	Kvinnherad
Utne	60°25′00″N 06°36′00″E	5778	Ullensvang
Utvik	61°48′21″N 06°31′02″E	6797	Stryn
Utsylta	60°43′16″N 04°55′11″E	5937	Alver
Utåker	59°47′00″N 05°56′00″E	5453	Kvinnherad
Vadbu	60°44′32″N 05°13′53″E	5955	Alver
Vadheim	61°12′29″N 05°49′48″E	6996	Høyanger
Valen	59°49′51″N 05°47′12″E	5451	Kvinnherad
Valestrand	59°40′24″N 05°28′00″E	5554	Sveio
Valestrandfossen	60°30′00″N 05°26′00″E	5281	Osterøy
Valevåg	59°41′51″N 05°28′32″E	5554	Sveio
Vallaheiane	60°17′48″N 05°22′27″E	5227	Bergen
Vallersneset	60°42′33″N 05°02′21″E	5939	Alver
Vallestad	61°21′52″N 06°13′39″E	6978	Sunnfjord
Vaksdal	60°29′00″N 05°44′00″E	5725	Vaksdal
Valvatna	59°46′00″N 05°25′00″E	5410	Stord
Vangsbygdi	60°30′00″N 06°52′00″E	5734	Eidfjord
Vangsnes	61°10′16″N 06°38′08″E	6894	Vik
Varaldsøy	60°05′49″N 05°58′32″E	5636	Kvinnherad
Vassenden	61°29′34″N 06°06′39″E	6847	Sunnfjord
Vasstrondi	60°48′00″N 06°36′00″E	5713	Voss
Vedvika	62°00′46″N 05°05′43″E	6710	Kinn
Veitastrond	61°28′21″N 07°02′38″E	6878	Luster
Veland	60°40′00″N 05°25′00″E	5993	Alver
Vereide	61°48′48″N 06°08′21″E	6823	Gloppen
Veslebygda	61°56′42″N 06°56′42″E	6783	Stryn
Vestbygdi	60°29′23″N 05°31′29″E	5286	Osterøy
Vestbygdi	60°38′37″N 06°13′56″E	5700	Voss
Vik	61°21′03″N 06°07′09″E	6978	Sunnfjord
Vikadal	60°25′47″N 06°24′16″E	5614	Kvam
Vikaneset	60°42′00″N 05°34′00″E	5994	Alver
Vikavågen	60°28′08″N 04°57′27″E	5337	Øygarden
Vikebygd	60°16′00″N 06°34′00″E	5776	Ullensvang
Vikebø	60°33′44″N 05°03′03″E	5917	Alver
Viki	60°37′00″N 06°18′00″E	5700	Voss
Vikse	59°29′45″N 05°16′59″E	5550	Sveio
Vikøy	60°20′57″N 06°10′19″E	5600	Kvam
Vikøyri	61°05′16″N 06°34′46″E	6893	Vik
Villanger	60°43′52″N 04°54′45″E	5937	Alver
Vilnes	61°19′07″N 04°57′32″E	6985	Askvoll
Vindnes	60°25′16″N 04°59′58″E	5363	Øygarden
Vinnes	60°01′00″N 05°16′00″E	5396	Austevoll
Vossevangen	60°38′00″N 06°26′00″E	5700	Voss
Votlo	60°28′09″N 05°28′00″E	5286	Osterøy
Våga	59°28′54″N 05°18′24″E	5550	Sveio
Våge	59°59′08″N 05°04′44″E	5398	Austevoll
Våge	60°02′49″N 05°31′04″E	5680	Tysnes
Vågseidet	60°43′28″N 05°12′50″E	5956	Alver
Vågsvåg	61°56′16″N 05°02′59″E	6700	Kinn
Ypso	60°33′15″N 05°00′19″E	5917	Alver
Ytre Arna	60°28′00″N 05°26′00″E	5265	Bergen
Ytre Matre	59°49′36″N 05°59′30″E	5498	Kvinnherad
Ytre Oppedal	61°03′24″N 05°30′42″E	5961	Gulen
Ytre Ålvik	60°25′00″N 06°22′00″E	5614	Kvam
Ytrøygrend	61°04′46″N 04°41′28″E	6927	Solund
Ænes	60°06′00″N 06°08′00″E	5475	Kvinnherad
Økland	59°47′44″N 05°07′55″E	5430	Bømlo
Ølve	59°59′34″N 05°47′06″E	5637	Kvinnherad
Øn	61°13′13″N 05°13′12″E	6958	Hyllestad
Øvrabø	59°46′01″N 05°24′12″E	5410	Stord
Øvre Eidfjord	60°25′24″N 07°07′48″E	5784	Eidfjord
Øvre Helland	60°51′10″N 05°58′13″E	5729	Modalen
Øvre Hålandsdal	60°15′03″N 5°55′29″E	5640	Bjørnafjorden
Øvre Årdal	61°18′31″N 07°48′10″E	6884	Årdal
Øystese	60°23′00″N 06°13′00″E	5610	Kvam
Øystrebø	61°03′50″N 05°41′05″E	5962	Høyanger
Ådlandsviki	60°31′54″N 05°01′32″E	5314	Askøy
Ådnavik	59°45′29″N 05°45′02″E	5458	Kvinnherad
Ågotnes	60°24′22″N 05°01′08″E	5363	Øygarden
Ålfoten	61°50′20″N 05°40′28″E	6737	Bremanger
Ålhus	61°31′49″N 06°13′55″E	6847	Sunnfjord
Åkra	59°47′29″N 06°05′54″E	5499	Kvinnherad
Ånneland	60°53′25″N 04°58′49″E	5977	Gulen
Årbakka	59°59′30″N 05°41′01″E	5693	Tysnes
Årdal	61°40′14″N 06°25′46″E	6827	Gloppen
Årdal	61°32′50″N 06°20′41″E	6843	Sunnfjord
Årdalstangen	61°14′13″N 07°41′54″E	6885	Årdal
Årland	59°59′22″N 05°04′53″E	5398	Austevoll
Årland	60°24′00″N 05°42′39″E	5652	Samnanger
Årås	60°46′41″N 04°55′59″E	5943	Austrheim
Åse	60°18′48″N 05°00′51″E	5357	Øygarden
Åsebø	60°34′10″N 05°04′29″E	5917	Alver
Åsnes	61°20′03″N 05°11′59″E	6969	Fjaler

== See also ==
- For other counties, see the lists of villages in Norway
