= Hatlestrand Church =

Church in Vestland, Norway

- Hatlestrand kyrkje
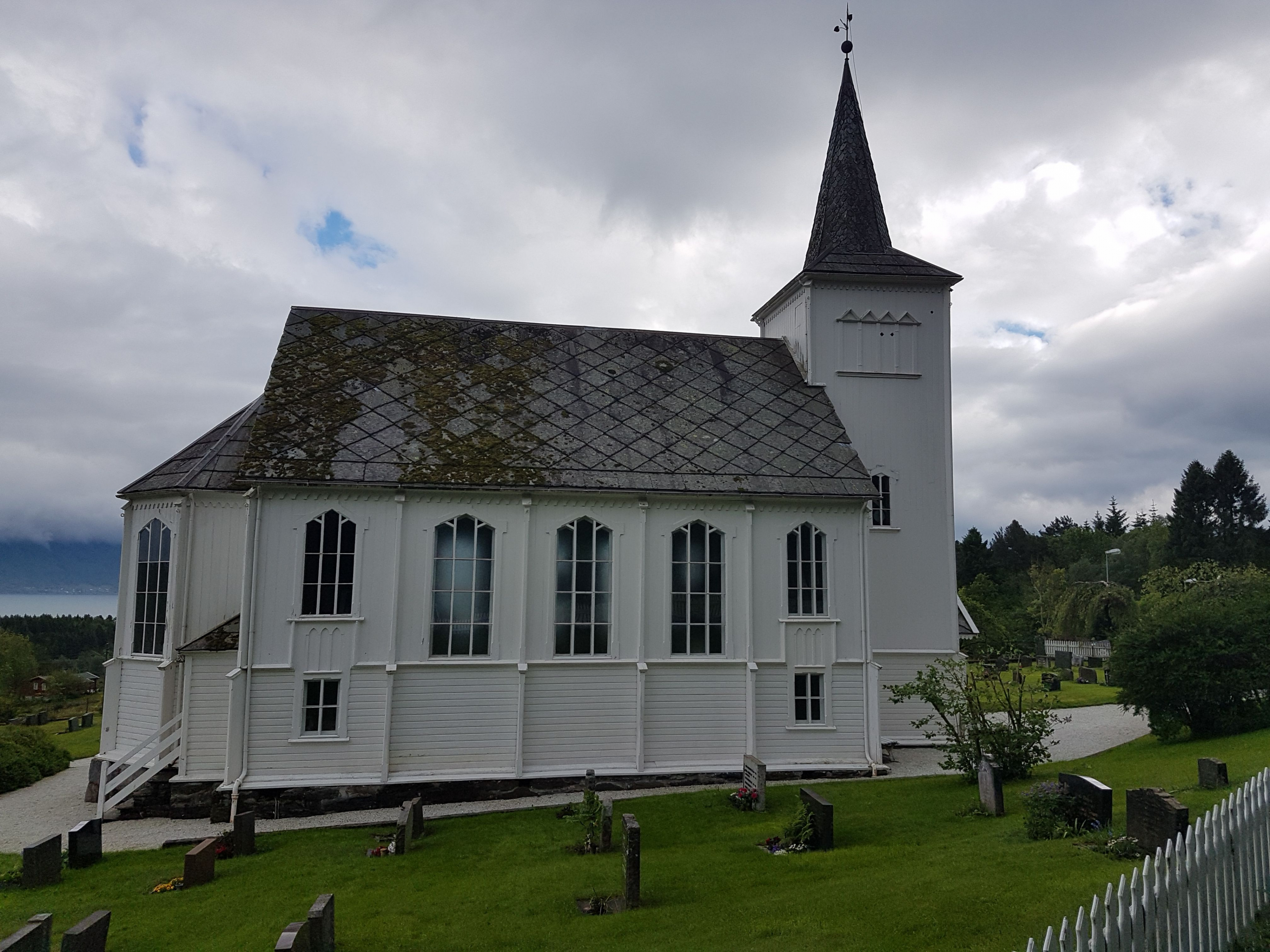
- View of the church
- Hatlestrand Church
- 60°02′44″N 5°54′07″E
- Location: Kvinnherad Municipality, Vestland
- Country: Norway
- Denomination: Church of Norway
- Churchmanship: Evangelical Lutheran

History
- Status: Parish church
- Founded: 1885
- Consecrated: 1885

Architecture
- Functional status: Active
- Architect(s): C.F. von der Lippe and Kjartan Imsland
- Architectural type: Long church
- Completed: 1885 (141 years ago)

Specifications
- Capacity: 140
- Materials: Wood

Administration
- Diocese: Bjørgvin bispedømme
- Deanery: Sunnhordland prosti
- Parish: Hatlestrand
- Norwegian Cultural Heritage Site
- Type: Church
- Status: Not protected
- ID: 84494

Hatlestrand Church (Norwegian: Hatlestrand kyrkje) is a parish church of the Church of Norway in Kvinnherad Municipality in Vestland county, Norway. It is located in the village of Hatlestrand. It is the church for the Hatlestrand parish which is part of the Sunnhordland prosti (deanery) in the Diocese of Bjørgvin. The white, wooden church was built in a long church design in 1885 using plans drawn up by the architects Conrad Fredrik von der Lippe and Kjartan Imsland. The church seats about 140 people.

== History ==
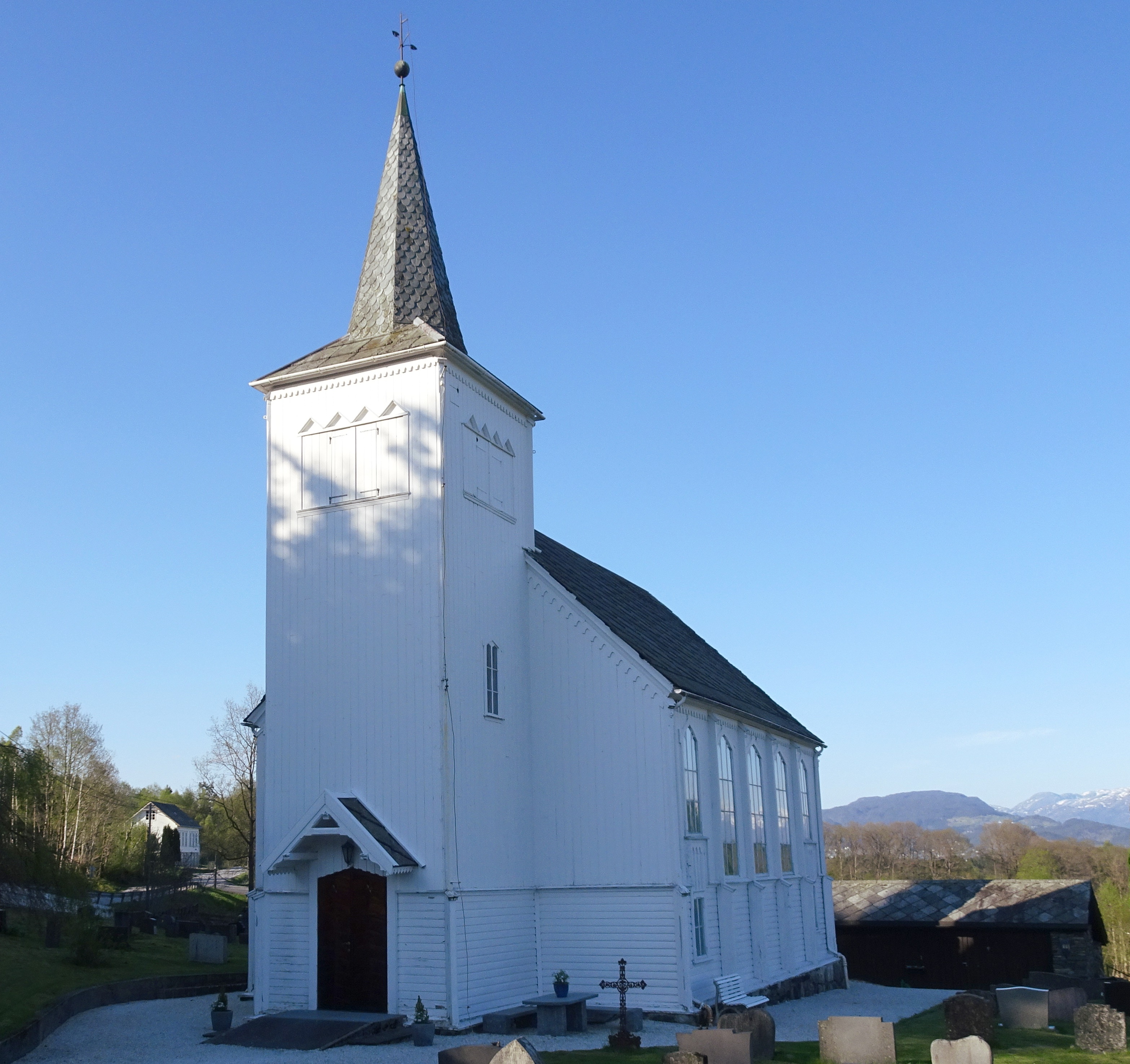
View of the church

The new parish of Hatlestrand was established in 1885 when it was separated from the Ølve Church parish. The new parish included the northern portion of Kvinnherad Municipality located on the west side of the fjord. A new church was built in the village that same year. This would be the first church in this village. It was designed by Conrad Fredrik von der Lippe and Kjartan Imsland. The new building was consecrated in 1885.

== See also ==
- List of churches in Bjørgvin
