= Ålvik Church =

Church in Vestland, Norway

- Ålvik kyrkje
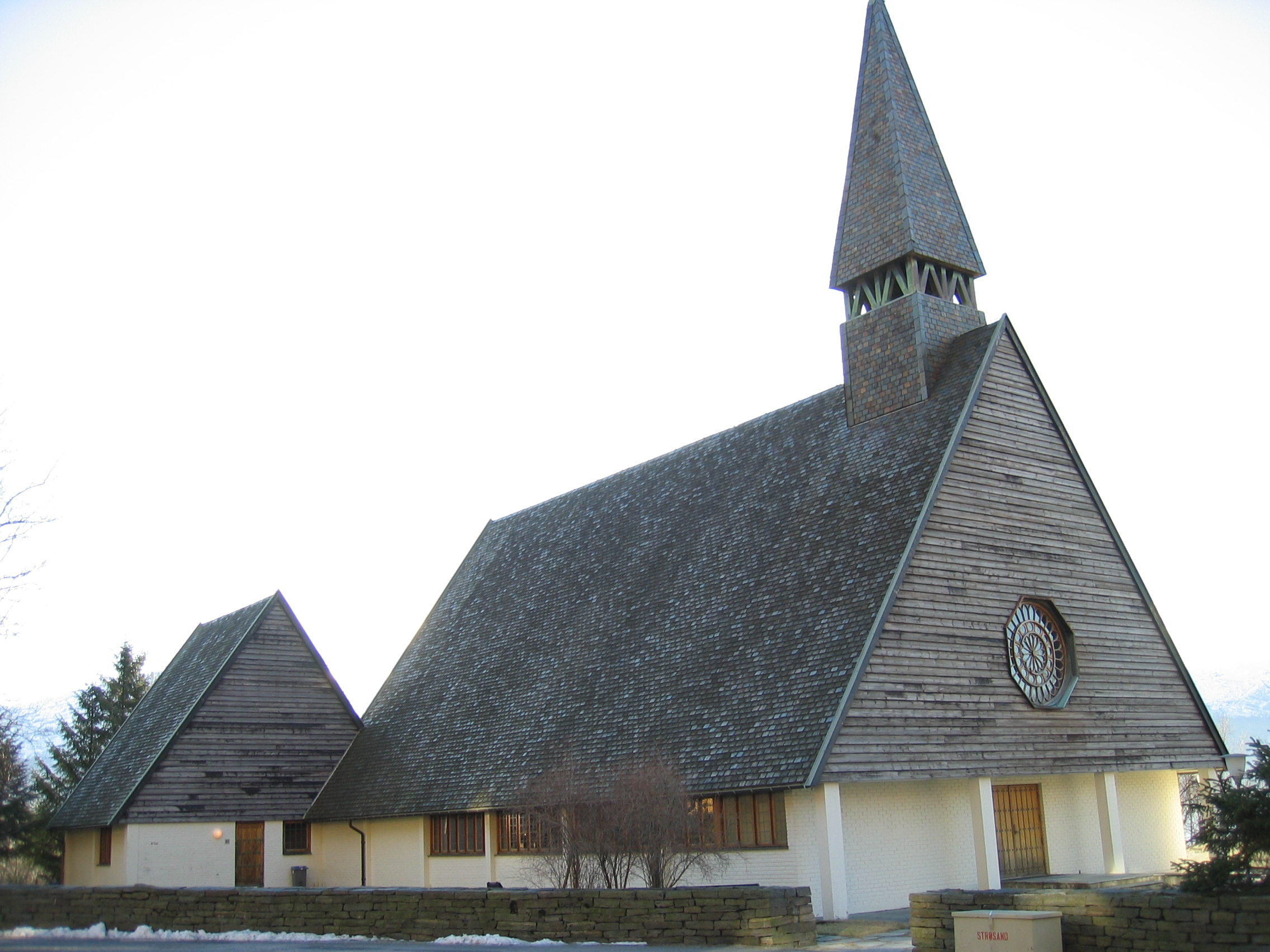
- View of the church
- Ålvik Church
- 60°26′05″N 6°25′51″E
- Location: Kvam Municipality, Vestland
- Country: Norway
- Denomination: Church of Norway
- Churchmanship: Evangelical Lutheran

History
- Status: Parish church
- Founded: 1962
- Consecrated: 15 April 1962

Architecture
- Functional status: Active
- Architect: Esben Poulsson
- Architectural type: Rectangular church
- Completed: 1962 (64 years ago)

Specifications
- Capacity: 280
- Materials: Brick

Administration
- Diocese: Bjørgvin bispedømme
- Deanery: Hardanger og Voss prosti
- Parish: Ålvik
- Norwegian Cultural Heritage Site
- Type: Church
- Status: Not protected
- ID: 85962

Ålvik Church (Norwegian: Ålvik kyrkje) is a parish church of the Church of Norway in Kvam Municipality in Vestland county, Norway. It is located in the village of Ålvik. It is the church for the Ålvik parish which is part of the Hardanger og Voss prosti (deanery) in the Diocese of Bjørgvin. The brick church was built in a rectangular design in 1962 using plans drawn up by the architect Esben Poulsson. The church seats about 280 people.

== History ==
The village of Ålvik grew up as an industrial site during the early 20th century. By the 1960s, the area received permission to build a church. Esben Poulsson, an architect from Oslo, was hired to design the new church. The walls are red brick that is painted white on the exterior. Off the northeast side of the church is a small extension that contains offices, bathroom, and a sacristy. The church was consecrated on 15 April 1962.

== See also ==
- List of churches in Bjørgvin
