= Kvalheim =

Village in Kinn Municipality, Norway

- Village
- Interactive map of Kvalheim
- Location within Vestland Location within Norway
- Coordinates: 61.9853°N 5.059°E
- Country: Norway
- Region: Western Norway
- County: Vestland
- District: Nordfjord
- Municipality: Kinn Municipality
- Elevation: 85 m (279 ft)

Population (2001)
  - Total: 163
- Time zone: UTC+01:00 (CET)
  - Summer (DST): UTC+02:00 (CEST)
- Post Code: 6710 Raudeberg

Kvalheim is a coastal village with large agricultural areas in Kinn Municipality in Vestland county, Norway. The village is located on the western side of the island of Vågsøy, about 5 kilometres (3.1 mi) west of the large village of Raudeberg. The neighboring villages of Refvika and Vedvika are located across the mountain to the northeast. The Kråkenes Lighthouse lies about 10 kilometres (6.2 mi) to the northwest and the Hendanes Lighthouse can be seen about 2.5 kilometres (1.6 mi) across the bay from Kvalheim. The nearest town is the municipal center of Måløy which is about a 15-minute drive to the southeast.

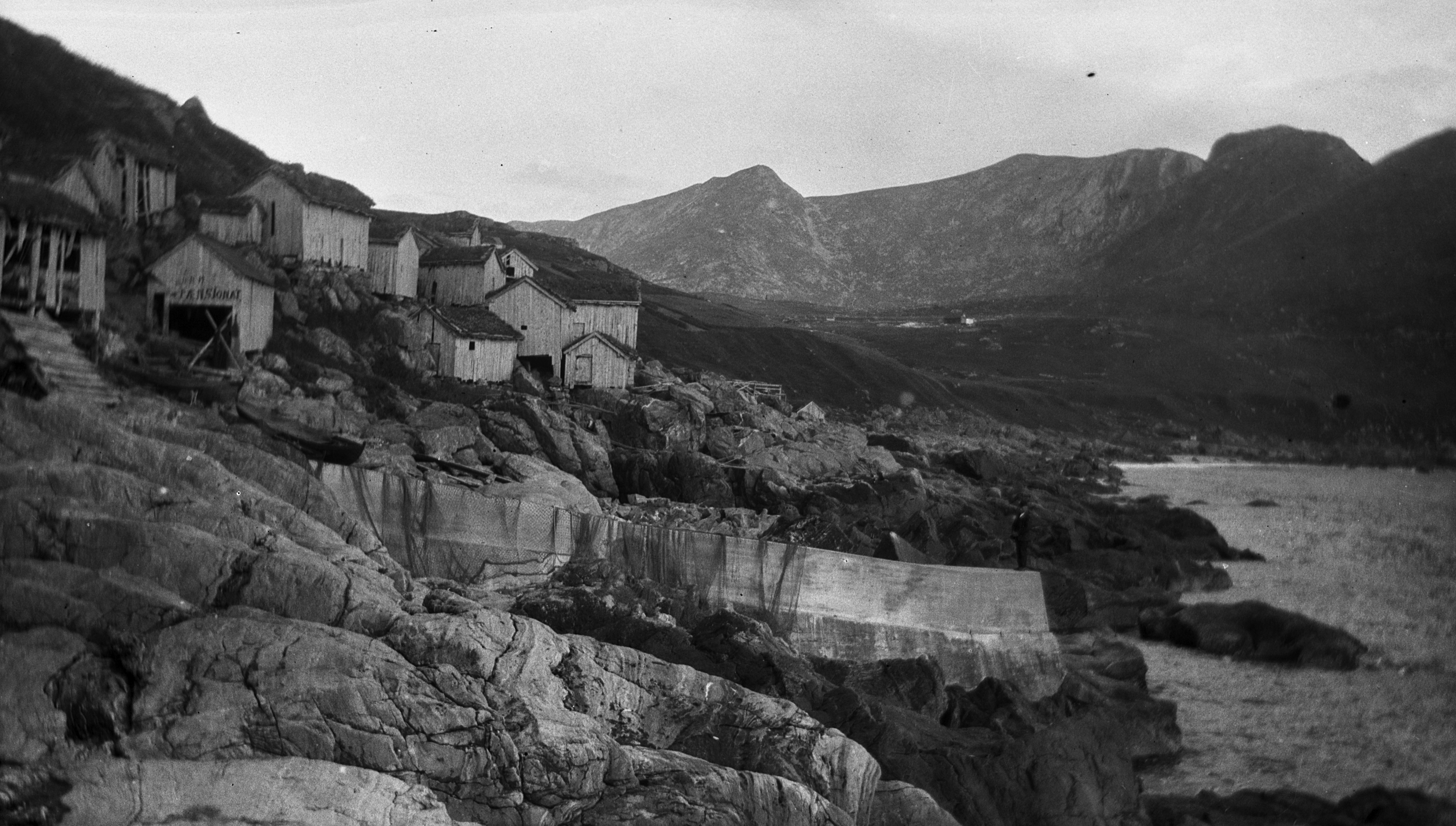
View of the village shoreline in 1914

Kvalheim had a population (in 2001) of 163. The village of Kvalheim is mentioned in sources reaching back to the 14th century. Some immigrants from Norway took this name as their surname when they traveled to the United States.
