= Haugstad =

Haugstad is a Norwegian surname. Notable people with the surname include:

- Bjørn Haugstad (born 1969), Norwegian civil servant and politician
- Eirik Haugstad (born 1994), Norwegian footballer
- Phil Haugstad (1924–1998), American baseball player
