= Misje =

Island in Vestland, Norway

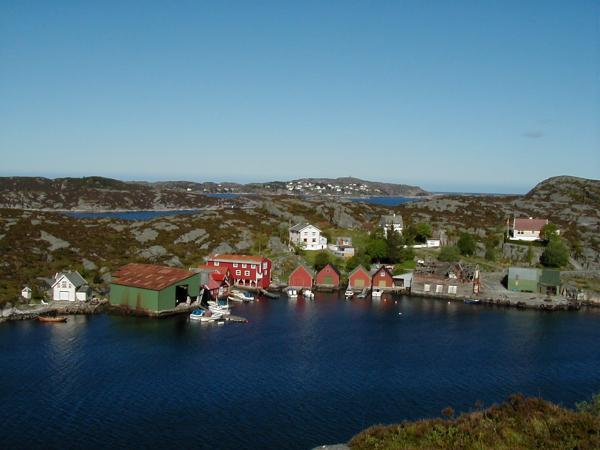
- Interactive map of Misje

Geography
- Location: Vestland, Norway
- Coordinates: 60.4508°N 4.9556°E
- Area: 1.16 km^{2} (0.45 sq mi)
- Length: 2.1 km (1.3 mi)
- Width: 935 m (3068 ft)
- Coastline: 4.9 km (3.04 mi)
- Highest elevation: 59 m (194 ft)
- Highest point: Storhaugen

Administration
- Norway
- County: Vestland
- Municipality: Øygarden Municipality

Demographics
- Population: 320 (2023)

Misje is an island (and village) in Øygarden Municipality in Vestland county, Norway. The 1.16-square-kilometre (0.45 sq mi) island lies just south of the island of Toftøyna and north of the large island of Sotra. Almost all of the 320 inhabitants (as of 2023) live on the eastern part of the island, which is referred to as the village of Misje.

== History ==
The island was historically part of the old Herdla Municipality. In 1964, it was transferred to the newly established Fjell Municipality. In 2020, it became part of Øygarden Municipality.

Since 1982, Solviksundet Bridge has connected Misje to the neighboring island of Sotra, which, in turn, is connected to the mainland by a series of bridges.

== See also ==
- List of islands of Norway
