= Husebø =

Husebø is a surname. Notable people with the surname include:

- Jens Husebø (born 1999), Norwegian footballer
- Knut Husebø (1946–2026), Norwegian actor
