= Holvika =

Village in Kinn Municipality, Norway

Holvika Holevik (unofficial)
- Village
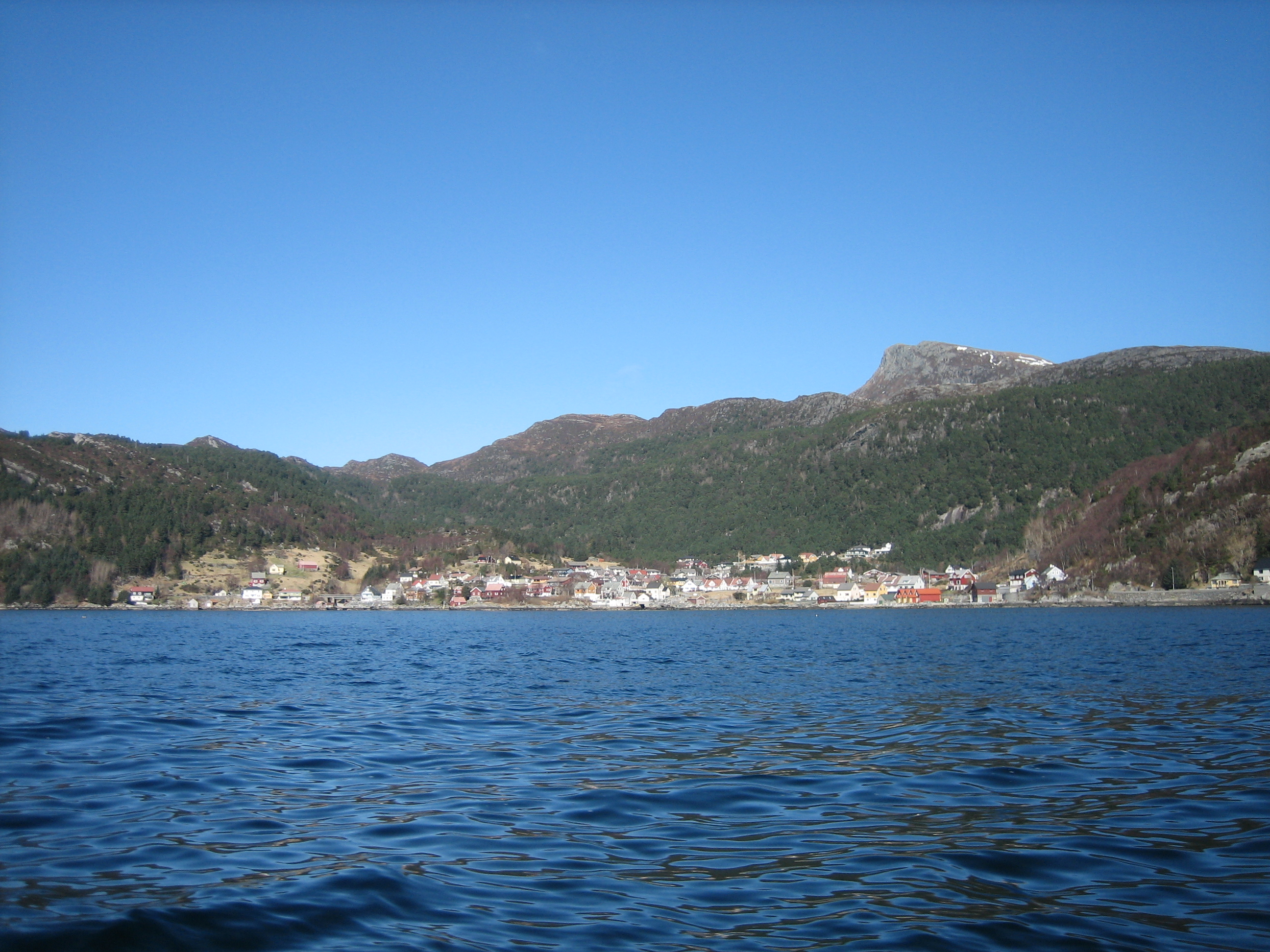
- Interactive map of Holvika
- Location within Vestland Location within Norway
- Coordinates: 61.92939°N 5.07951°E
- Country: Norway
- Region: Western Norway
- County: Vestland
- District: Nordfjord
- Municipality: Kinn Municipality

Area
  - Total: 0.18 km^{2} (0.069 sq mi)
- Elevation: 11 m (36 ft)

Population (2024)
  - Total: 320
  - Density: 1,778/km^{2} (4,600/sq mi)
- Time zone: UTC+01:00 (CET)
  - Summer (DST): UTC+02:00 (CEST)
- Post Code: 6700 Måløy

Holvika (sometimes unofficially spelled Holevik) is a small village on the south side of the island of Vågsøy in Kinn Municipality in Vestland county, Norway. It is situated along the Vågsfjorden, a part of the large Nordfjorden. The village is located about 3 kilometres (1.9 mi) southwest of the town of Måløy and about 2.5 kilometres (1.6 mi) east of the village of Vågsvåg. Across Vågsfjorden, the village of Husevåg lies on the island of Husevågøy.

The 0.18-square-kilometre (44-acre) village has a population (2024) of 320 and a population density of 1,778 inhabitants per square kilometre (4,600/sq mi).

During World War II, Operation Archery took place in and around Holvika and Måløy.
