= Klakegg =

Klakegg is a Norwegian surname. Notable people with the surname include:

- Bjørn Klakegg (born 1958), Norwegian jazz guitarist and composer
- Rune Klakegg (born 1955), Norwegian jazz pianist and composer
