= Hatlestranda =

Village in Kvinnherad Municipality, Norway

Hatlestranda Hatlestrand
- Village
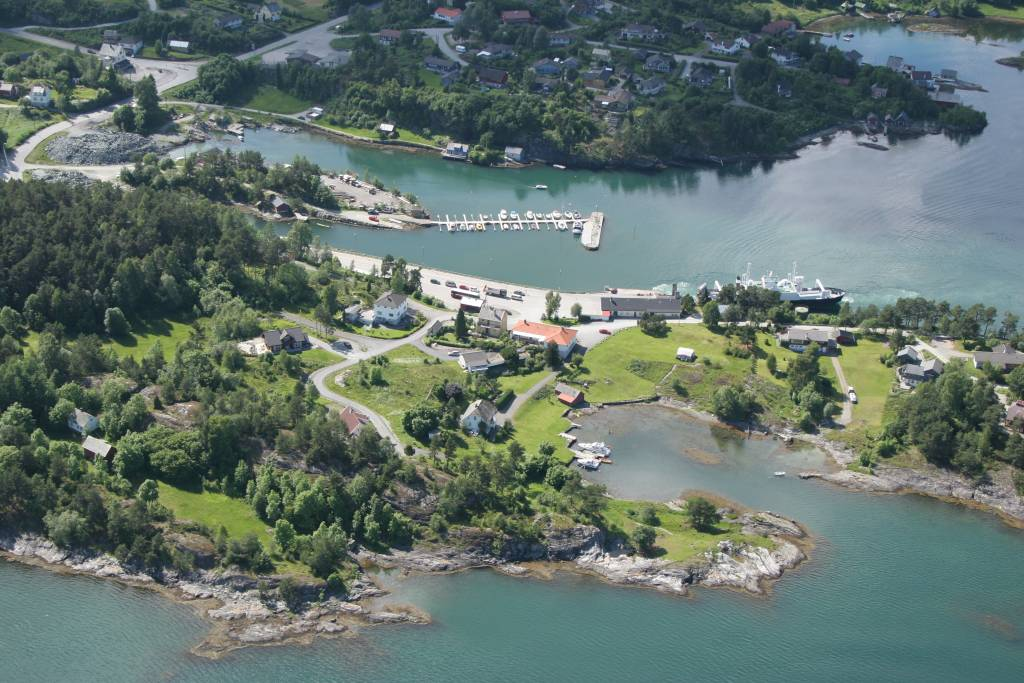
- View of the village
- Interactive map of Hatlestranda
- Coordinates: 60.04657°N 5.90209°E
- Country: Norway
- Region: Western Norway
- County: Vestland
- District: Sunnhordland
- Municipality: Kvinnherad Municipality

Area
  - Total: 0.22 km^{2} (0.085 sq mi)
- Elevation: 54 m (177 ft)

Population (2016)
  - Total: 232
  - Density: 1,055/km^{2} (2,730/sq mi)
- Time zone: UTC+01:00 (CET)
  - Summer (DST): UTC+02:00 (CEST)
- Post Code: 5635 Hatlestrand

Hatlestranda is a village in Kvinnherad Municipality in Vestland county, Norway. The village is located along the Hardangerfjorden, northeast of the villages of Husa and Ølve. The north end of the village is the site of a ferry port called Gjermundshamn, which has regular ferry connections to the island of Varaldsøy and to Årsnes on the opposite side of the fjord. Hatlestrand Church is located in the village.

The 0.22-square-kilometre (54-acre) village had a population (2016) of 232 and a population density of 1,055 inhabitants per square kilometre (2,730/sq mi). Since 2000, the population and area data for this village area has not been separately tracked by Statistics Norway.
