= Hendanes Lighthouse =

Coastal lighthouse in Kinn, Norway

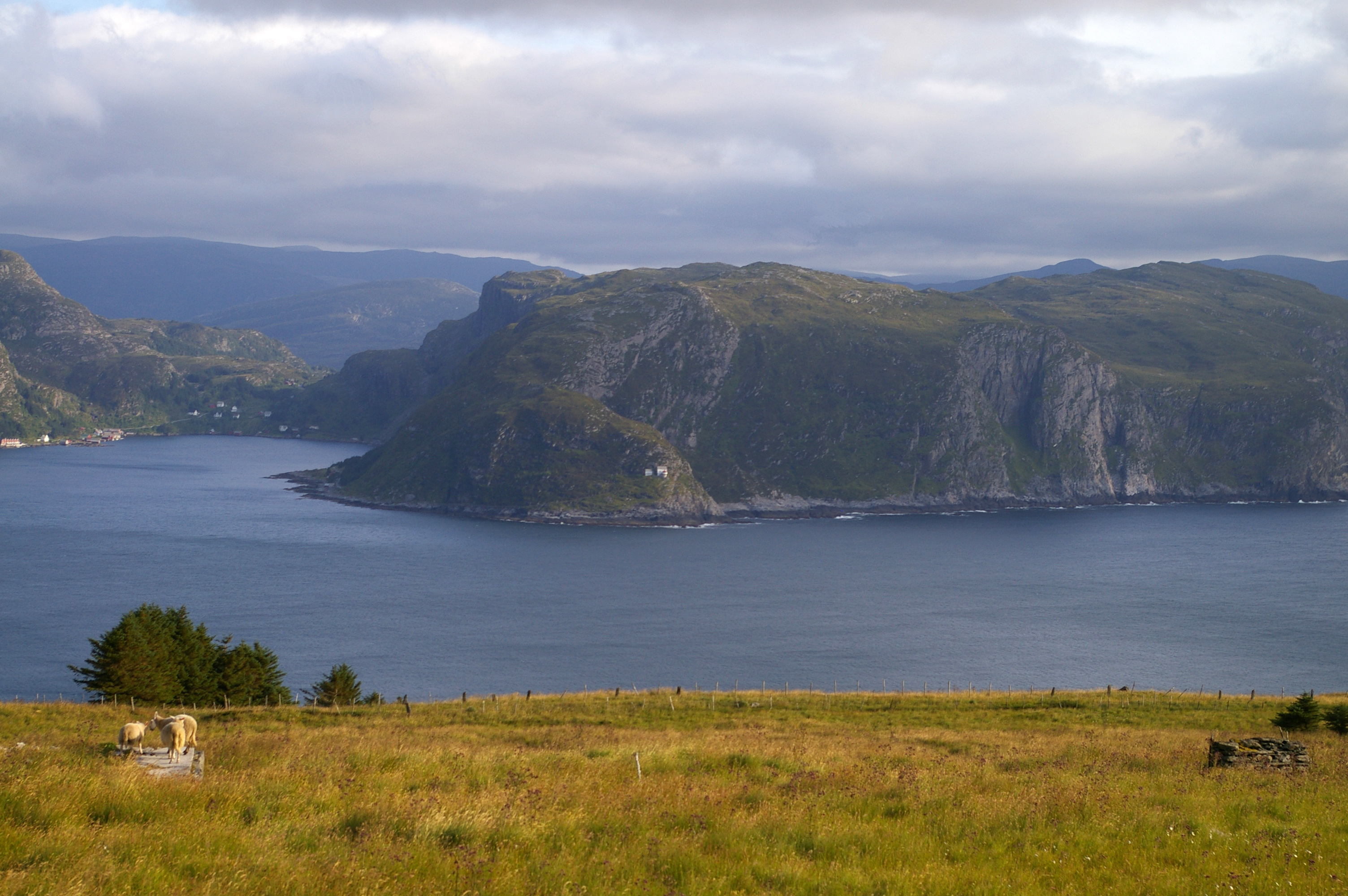
- View of the Hendanes Lighthouse
- Location: Kinn Municipality; Vestland; Norway
- Coordinates: 61°57′53.1″N 05°02′04.6″E

Tower
- Constructed: 1914
- Construction: wooden tower
- Automated: 1952
- Height: 12 metres (39 ft)
- Shape: octagonal tower with balcony and lantern
- Markings: white tower, red top

Light
- Focal height: 48.5 metres (159 ft)
- Range: 12.8 nmi (23.7 km; 14.7 mi)
- Characteristic: Oc (2) WRG 8s.

Hendanes Lighthouse (Norwegian: Hendanes fyr) is a coastal lighthouse located in Kinn Municipality in Vestland county, Norway. The lighthouse sits on the western shore of the island of Vågsøy, about 3 kilometres (1.9 mi) north of the village of Vågsvåg.

== History ==
It was first lit in 1914 and it was replaced by an automated light in 1952. A radio beacon was active from 1963 to 1992.

The octagonal wood tower and adjacent lighthouse keeper's home are built into the side of a mountain. The tower is painted white and the lantern is red. The light sits at an elevation of 48.5 metres (159 ft) above sea level. The light emits a white, red or green light, depending on direction, occulting twice every 8 seconds. The light can be seen for up to 12.8 nautical miles (23.7 km; 14.7 mi).

== See also ==
- List of lighthouses in Norway
- Lighthouses in Norway
