= Salbu =

Salbu is a surname. Notable people with the surname include:

- Bersvend Salbu (born 1968), Norwegian farmer and politician
- Brit Salbu (born 1947), Norwegian radiochemist and radioecologist
- Konrad Salbu (1904–1986), Norwegian chess master
- Steve Salbu, American academic
