= Ølve Church =

Church in Vestland, Norway

- Ølve kyrkje
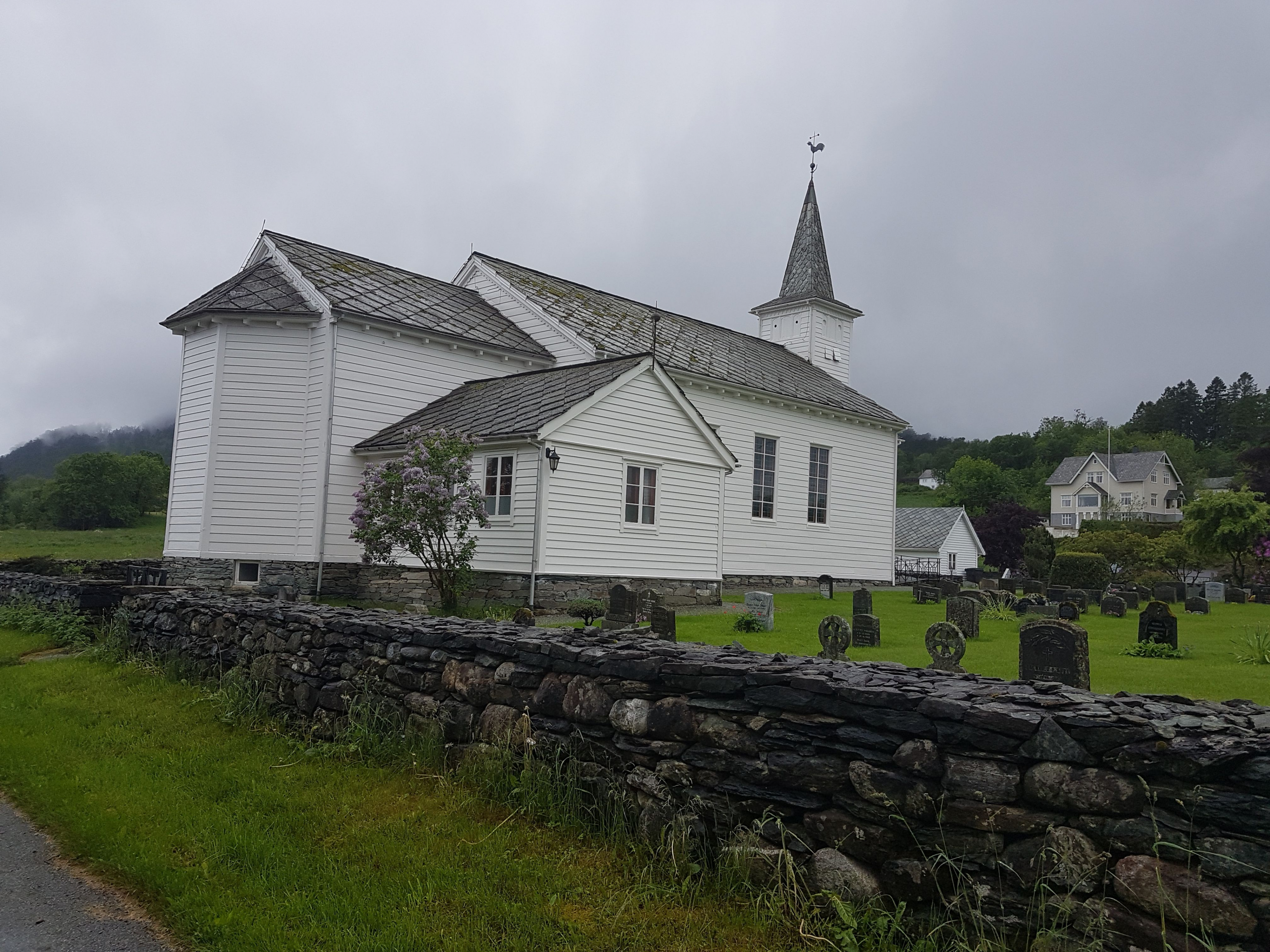
- View of the church
- Ølve Church
- 59°59′33″N 5°47′04″E
- Location: Kvinnherad Municipality, Vestland
- Country: Norway
- Denomination: Church of Norway
- Previous denomination: Catholic Church
- Churchmanship: Evangelical Lutheran

History
- Status: Parish church
- Founded: 14th century
- Consecrated: 13 Oct 1861

Architecture
- Functional status: Active
- Architect: Hans Linstow
- Architectural type: Long church
- Completed: 1861 (165 years ago)

Specifications
- Capacity: 230
- Materials: Wood

Administration
- Diocese: Bjørgvin bispedømme
- Deanery: Sunnhordland prosti
- Parish: Ølve
- Norwegian Cultural Heritage Site
- Type: Church
- Status: Listed
- ID: 85903

Ølve Church (Norwegian: Ølve kyrkje) is a parish church of the Church of Norway in Kvinnherad Municipality in Vestland county, Norway. It is located in the village of Ølve. It is the church for the Ølve parish which is part of the Sunnhordland prosti (deanery) in the Diocese of Bjørgvin. The white, wooden church was built in a long church design in 1861 using plans drawn up by the architect Hans Linstow. The church seats about 230 people.

== History ==
The earliest existing historical records of the church date back to the year 1432, but it was not new that year. The first church in Ølve was probably a wooden stave church that may have been built during the 14th century. Nothing is known about that church. Around the 1640s, the old stave church was torn down and replaced with a new timber-framed building (one source says that this may have happened in 1615). The Barony Rosendal was established in 1678 and the church was given as part of the barony. In 1788, the church was renovated. The church was owned by the Barony from 1678 until 1855 when it was sold to the municipality. Soon afterwards, the municipality determined that the old church needed to be replaced. In 1861, the church was torn down and replaced with a new church on the same site. The new church was consecrated on 13 October 1861. In 1953, an extension on the north side of the choir was constructed during a major repair and rebuilding of the church that was carried out under the direction of architect Torgeir Alvsaker.

== See also ==
- List of churches in Bjørgvin
