= Ålvik =

Village in Kvam Municipality, Norway

Ålvik Indre Ålvik
- Village
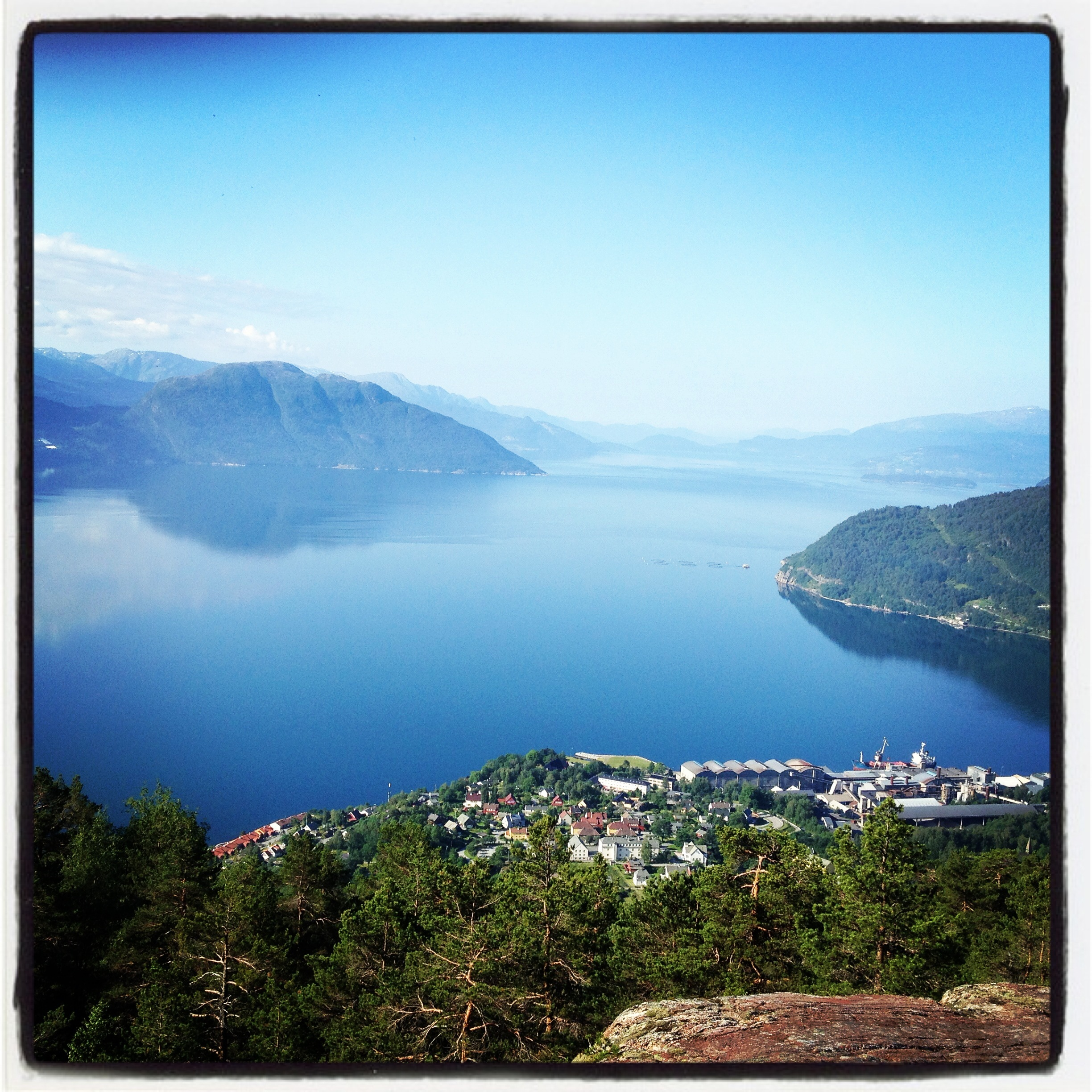
- View of the village
- Interactive map of Ålvik
- Coordinates: 60.43274°N 6.43164°E
- Country: Norway
- Region: Western Norway
- County: Vestland
- District: Hardanger
- Municipality: Kvam Municipality

Area
  - Total: 0.69 km^{2} (0.27 sq mi)
- Elevation: 36 m (118 ft)

Population (2025)
  - Total: 452
  - Density: 655/km^{2} (1,700/sq mi)
- Time zone: UTC+01:00 (CET)
  - Summer (DST): UTC+02:00 (CEST)
- Post Code: 5614 Ålvik

Ålvik is a village in Kvam Municipality in Vestland county, Norway. The village "urban area" consists of the settlements of Ytre Ålvik and Indre Ålvik (outer and inner Ålvik) plus the nearby village of Vikedal. The settlements are located on either side of a ridge with Vikedal in between. Indre Ålvik has been heavily industrialised since the early 1900s, when Bjølvefossen A/S was established. The village lies along the Ålvik bay on the northern shore of the Hardangerfjord. Ålvik Church is located in the village.

The 0.69-square-kilometre (170-acre) village has a population (2025) of 452 and a population density of 655 inhabitants per square kilometre (1,700/sq mi).

== History ==
The name "Ålvik" is probably derived from Old Norse word ǫlr which means "alder" and the word vík which means "bay". The settlement here dates back at least to 600-700 BC, as documented by bronze artifacts found in the Vikedal area. In medieval times, Ålvik belonged to the estates of Norheim in Norheimsund.

The foundations for Indre Ålvik as an industrial district were laid in 1905, when Bjølvefossen A/S was incorporated to exploit the Bjølvo waterfalls for hydroelectric energy. In 1907, the village still had only 74 inhabitants, as little activity took place until Bjølvefossen A/S was sold to Elektrokemisk A/S in 1913. After this, construction of the Bjølvefossen hydroelectric plant commenced. The construction was however stalled due to concession disputes, as it was claimed that the work on the plant had begun before Norwegian escheat laws had been put in force in 1907.

The disputes were solved in 1916 and both the plant and factories were completed by 1919, producing calcium carbide for a brief time. The village's population briefly rose by 500 workers, but most left shortly thereafter, as financial problems and an accident destroying the pipelines that supplied water from the hydroelectric reservoir brought production to a halt. This forced Bjølvefossen A/S to default on large loans. Large-scale production was only resumed in 1928, when, after the pledgees had established contact with C. Tennant's Sons & Co., Bjølvefossen A/S was given major sales contracts for ferrosilicon to the British steel industry, in an effort to open a price war with the European ferrosilicon syndicate. Production was briefly hit by the Great Depression, but quickly rebounded and a production line for ferrochrome was established in 1934, the same year that the company saw its first profit.

Ålvik gained a road connection to Bergen in 1937, when the Fyksesund Bridge was opened. Nearly all of the village's infrastructure was owned by Bjølvefossen A/S for a long time, to a great extent making it a company town, and it was a separate regulatory area until 1965.

In the 1950s several new furnaces for production of ferrochrome and ferrosilicon were installed. During the 1960s, Bjølvefossen struggled to remain competitive, yet was able to invest in new production facilities on both production lines. In the 1970s, however, new technology in steel production reduced demand for the low-carbon ferrochrome that was produced. Government environmental regulations also put pressure on the production economy. Employment at the plant thus peaked at about 600 in this decade, before ferrochrome production was discontinued on the old production line in 1979 and on the new in 1983. Ferrosilicon production was prioritised to comply with environmental standards, furnaces were rebuilt to a closed type, making it possible to recycle excess heat in a steam turbine and to remove all dust from the discharge fumes. The dust, silica slurry, was found to be a saleable product.

The 1970s saw the entrance of women into production positions at the plant. Before this, the female population of Ålvik was mostly engaged in housekeeping, although some positions were open to women in cleaning and clerk jobs, besides public services. The first women begun work in the packing facilities, and relatively few took positions at the furnaces.

In 2001, the owner, Elkem decided to lay off 100 of 245 workers at Bjølvefossen A/S.

== Natural geography ==
Ålvik is situated on the northern side of the Hardangerfjord, facing the deepest stretch of the fjord. Ålvik is divided by a ridge into two main settlements, Indre Ålvik and Ytre Ålvik. The name Ålvik denotes the two settlements as a unit.

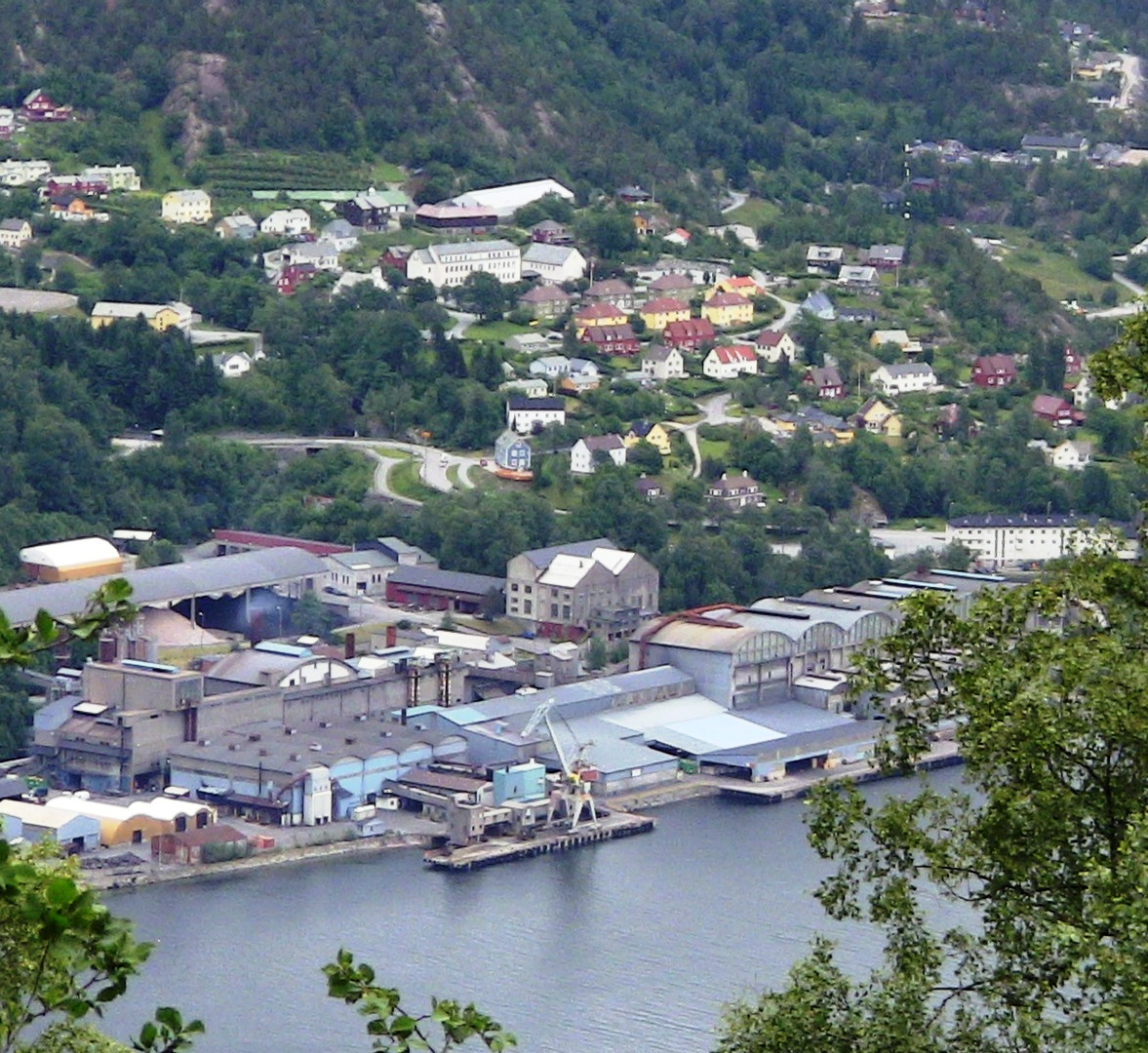
View of Indre Ålvik from the west. Bjølvefossen A/S in the foreground.

The bedrock in the Ålvik area consists mainly of gabbro and granite from the Bergsdal field. The vegetation at sea level is sarmatic mixed forest, rich in alm. Mountainous forests are found at higher altitudes. The village has several populations of the orchid sword-leaved helleborine and a natural reserve containing an especially large population of taxus baccata.

== Economy ==
The former Bjølvefossen A/S is the village's main employer, it has historically dominated to such an extent that the village has been referred to as the most typical monotown in Norway. It is now a subsidiary of Elkem, Elkem Bjølvefossen, which in turn is owned by China National Bluestar. In 2006 it was decided to move ferrosilicon production to Elkem Iceland, and at that time the plant had a staff of about 160. Elkem has since announced that the old production will be replaced by a process recycling waste from aluminium production, which will require a staff of about 60. However, as of March 2012, production was still running at full capacity, and hiring new staff was being discussed.

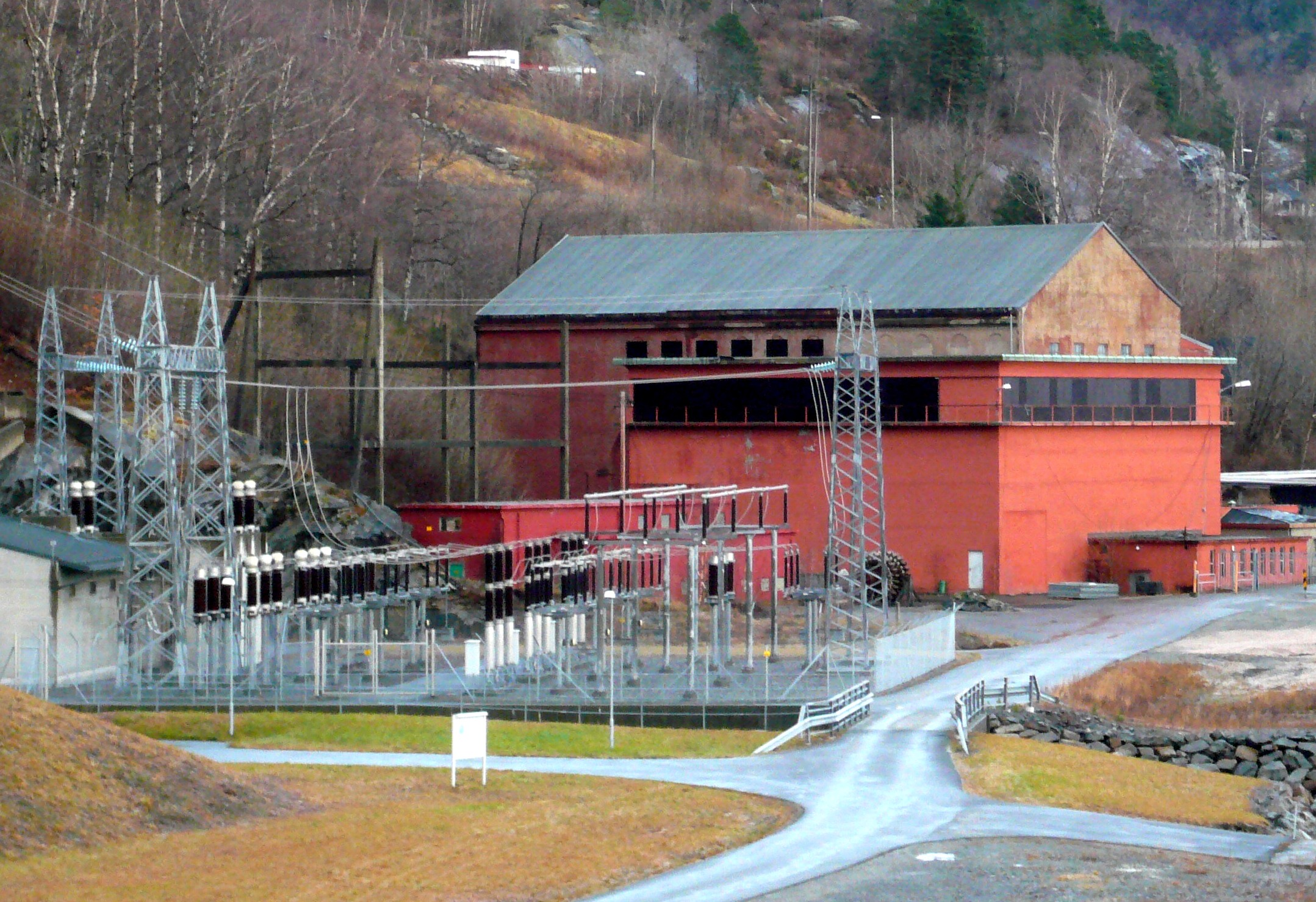
Nye Bjølvo hydroelectric power plant. The original building is seen in the background.

Bjølvo kraftverk, the hydroelectric plant originally built to power industrial production was returned to state ownership by escheat in 1964, and is now owned by Statkraft. The current, modernised plant, Nye Bjølvo, was completed in 2006 and at that time had the highest free-fall pressure shaft of any European hydroelectric plant, at more than 600 m. It has a yearly output of about 390 GWh. The plant exploits the reservoir Bjølsegrøvatnet, which has a regulated surface at 850–879 meters above sea level.

Kvam Municipality runs the following public services in Ålvik: a kindergarten, a school covering the 1st through 7th grades, a medical office and a care home.

== Cultural life and heritage ==
The Ålvik Industrial Worker's Museum documents the village's labour heritage through the exposition of two restored worker's apartments typical to the 1920s and 50s, and is housed in an original neo-classical building. In a cooperation between Elkem Bjølvefossen and Kvam municipality, an artist's collective was established in one of Bjølvefossen's buildings. This arrangement has now expired, and its future is unclear. In a project developed in cooperation with the Bergen Academy of Art and Design, a co-localised café and library was established in 2010. The village has a wealth of volunteer organisations, among them Ålvik Rock, which stages a Rock Festival each September.

After the completion of Nye Bjølvo hydroelectric plant, the old funicular became obsolete. It was originally built for construction and maintenance access to the original pipes leading water from the hydroelectric reservoir to the plant, and had a maximal inclination of 61 degrees along its 1500-meter course. It was discussed whether it could be conserved as part of the region's cultural heritage and run as a tourist attraction, but this proposal failed.
