= Sylta =

- Location within Stockholm Location within Sweden
- Coordinates: 59°29′N 17°43′E
- Country: Sweden
- Province: Uppland
- County: Stockholm County
- Municipality: Upplands-Bro Municipality

Area
  - Total: 0.39 km^{2} (0.15 sq mi)

Population (2005-12-31)
  - Total: 763
  - Density: 1,943/km^{2} (5,030/sq mi)
- Time zone: UTC+1 (CET)
  - Summer (DST): UTC+2 (CEST)

Sylta is a village situated in Upplands-Bro Municipality, Stockholm County, Sweden with 763 inhabitants in 2005.
