= Sundsbø =

Sundsbø is a Norwegian surname. Notable people with the surname include:

- Dagfinn Sundsbø (born 1946), Norwegian politician
- Sølve Sundsbø (born 1970), Norwegian fashion photographer
- Svein Sundsbø (born 1943), Norwegian businessman and politician
