= Nyttingnes =

Village in Kinn Municipality, Norway

- Village
- Interactive map of Nyttingnes
- Location within Vestland Location within Norway
- Coordinates: 61.59497°N 5.21732°E
- Country: Norway
- Region: Western Norway
- County: Vestland
- District: Sunnfjord
- Municipality: Kinn Municipality
- Elevation: 24 m (79 ft)

Population (2001)
  - Total: 28
- Time zone: UTC+01:00 (CET)
  - Summer (DST): UTC+02:00 (CEST)
- Post Code: 6940 Eikefjord

Nyttingnes is a hamlet with 28 inhabitants and 9 houses in Kinn Municipality in Vestland county, Norway. Nyttingnes is located 6 kilometres (3.7 mi) northwest of the village of Steinhovden and about 3 kilometres (1.9 mi) across the fjord from the village of Brandsøy. The town of Florø lies about 8 kilometres (5.0 mi) to the west, although the road from Nyttingnes to Florø goes around the fjord via the village of Eikefjord, a 40-kilometre (25 mi) long drive.

In recent history, there has been a negative demographic trend in this village. Nyttingnes is made up of the farms: Tunet, Bakken, Pergarden, Ludviggarden, Kvia and Opptun. Historically, the inhabitants were farmers and fishermen. The nearby Skårafjæra beach area is popular for many tourists.
