= Vågsvåg =

Village in Kinn Municipality, Norway

- Village
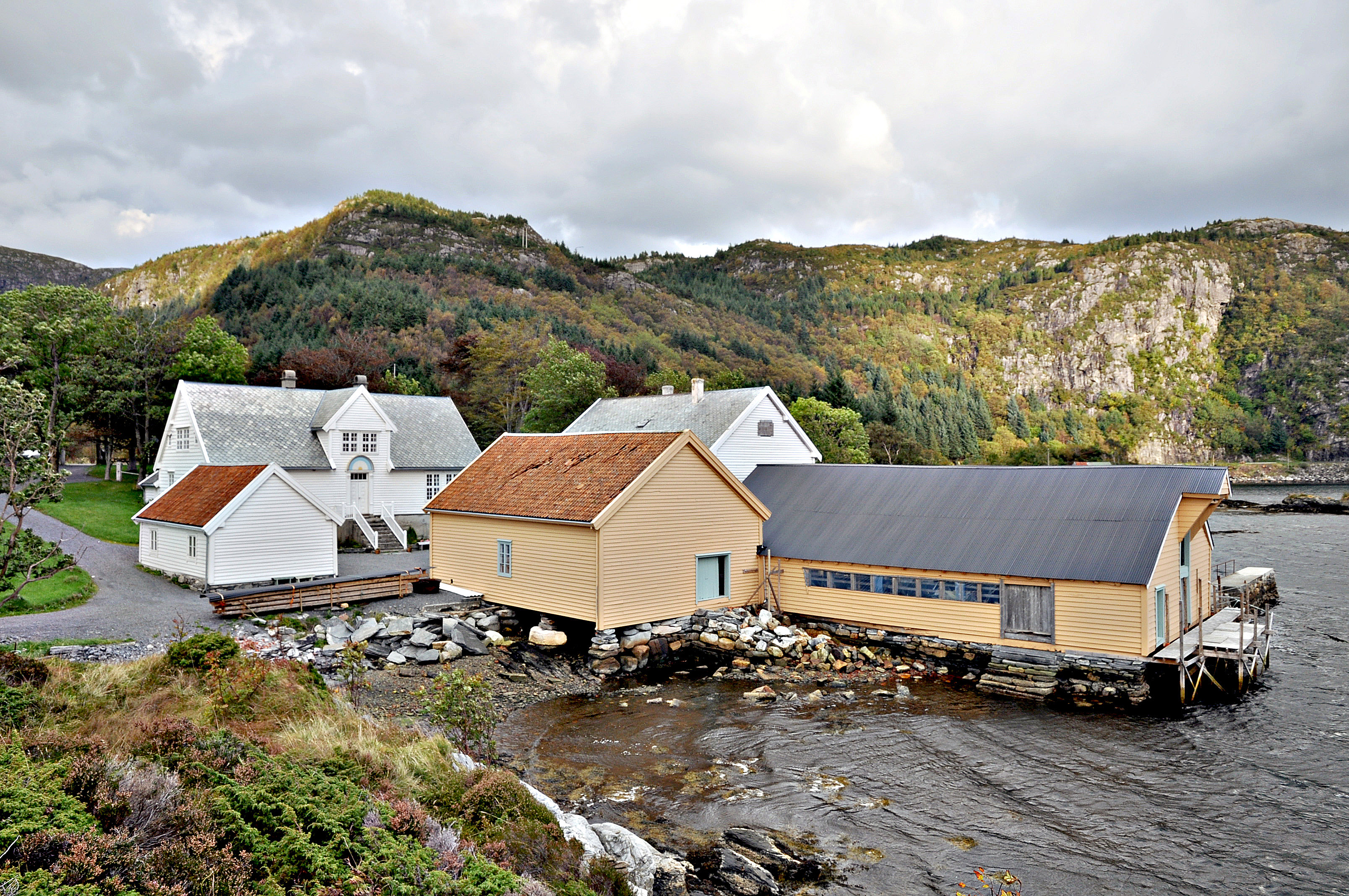
- View of the Vågsberget handelsstad, along the shore in Vågsvåg
- Interactive map of Vågsvåg
- Location within Vestland Location within Norway
- Coordinates: 61.9374°N 5.04783°E
- Country: Norway
- Region: Western Norway
- County: Vestland
- District: Nordfjord
- Municipality: Kinn Municipality

Area
  - Total: 0.25 km^{2} (0.097 sq mi)
- Elevation: 5 m (16 ft)

Population (2020)
  - Total: 205
  - Density: 820/km^{2} (2,100/sq mi)
- Time zone: UTC+01:00 (CET)
  - Summer (DST): UTC+02:00 (CEST)
- Post Code: 6700 Måløy

Vågsvåg is a village in Kinn Municipality in Vestland county, Norway. It is located on the southern shore of the island of Vågsøy along the Vågsfjorden, a part of the main Nordfjorden. The village looks across the fjord towards the island of Husevågøy.

Vågsvåg is located about 2.5 kilometres (1.6 mi) northwest of the village of Holvika, and about 6 kilometres (3.7 mi) west of the town of Måløy. The Hendanes Lighthouse lies about 3 kilometres (1.9 mi) north of Vågsvåg.

The 0.25-square-kilometre (62-acre) village had a population (2020) of 205 and a population density of 820 inhabitants per square kilometre (2,100/sq mi). Since 2020, the population and area data for this village area has not been separately tracked by Statistics Norway.
