= Kolbeinsvik =

Village in Austevoll Municipality, Norway

- Village
- Interactive map of Kolbeinsvik
- Coordinates: 60.04189°N 5.20214°E
- Country: Norway
- Region: Western Norway
- County: Vestland
- District: Midhordland
- Municipality: Austevoll Municipality
- Elevation: 15 m (49 ft)
- Time zone: UTC+01:00 (CET)
  - Summer (DST): UTC+02:00 (CEST)
- Post Code: 5394 Kolbeinsvik

Kolbeinsvik is a village in Austevoll Municipality in Vestland county, Norway. The village is located on the western shores of the island of Huftarøy, about 7 kilometres (4.3 mi) northwest of the villages of Vinnes and Husavik. The small islands of Drøna and Rostøya lie just to the north, off the coast of Huftarøy. It had a population of 481 in 2001.
