= Husa =

Village in Kvinnherad Municipality, Norway

- Village
- Interactive map of Husa
- Coordinates: 60.01336°N 5.80751°E
- Country: Norway
- Region: Western Norway
- County: Vestland
- District: Sunnhordland
- Municipality: Kvinnherad Municipality
- Elevation: 16 m (52 ft)
- Time zone: UTC+01:00 (CET)
  - Summer (DST): UTC+02:00 (CEST)
- Post Code: 5637 Ølve

Husa is a village in the Ølve district of Kvinnherad Municipality in Vestland county, Norway. The village is located at the end of a small bay off the main Hardangerfjorden. The village lies about 2.5 kilometres (1.6 mi) north of the village of Ølve and about 8 kilometres (5.0 mi) southwest of the village of Hatlestranda.
