= Vikedal, Vestland =

Village in Kvam Municipality, Norway

Vikedal Vikadal
- Village
- Interactive map of Vikedal
- Coordinates: 60.42987°N 6.40455°E
- Country: Norway
- Region: Western Norway
- County: Vestland
- District: Hardanger
- Municipality: Kvam Municipality
- Elevation: 10 m (33 ft)
- Time zone: UTC+01:00 (CET)
  - Summer (DST): UTC+02:00 (CEST)
- Post Code: 5614 Ålvik

Vikedal is a small village in Kvam Municipality in Vestland county, Norway. It is located along Norwegian County Road 7, about 1.4 kilometres (0.87 mi) west of the village of Indre Ålvik. Ålvik's population (in 2025) was 452, and Vikedal is included in that number since it is part of the Ålvik urban area.
