= Vikavågen =

Village in Øygarden Municipality, Norway

- Village
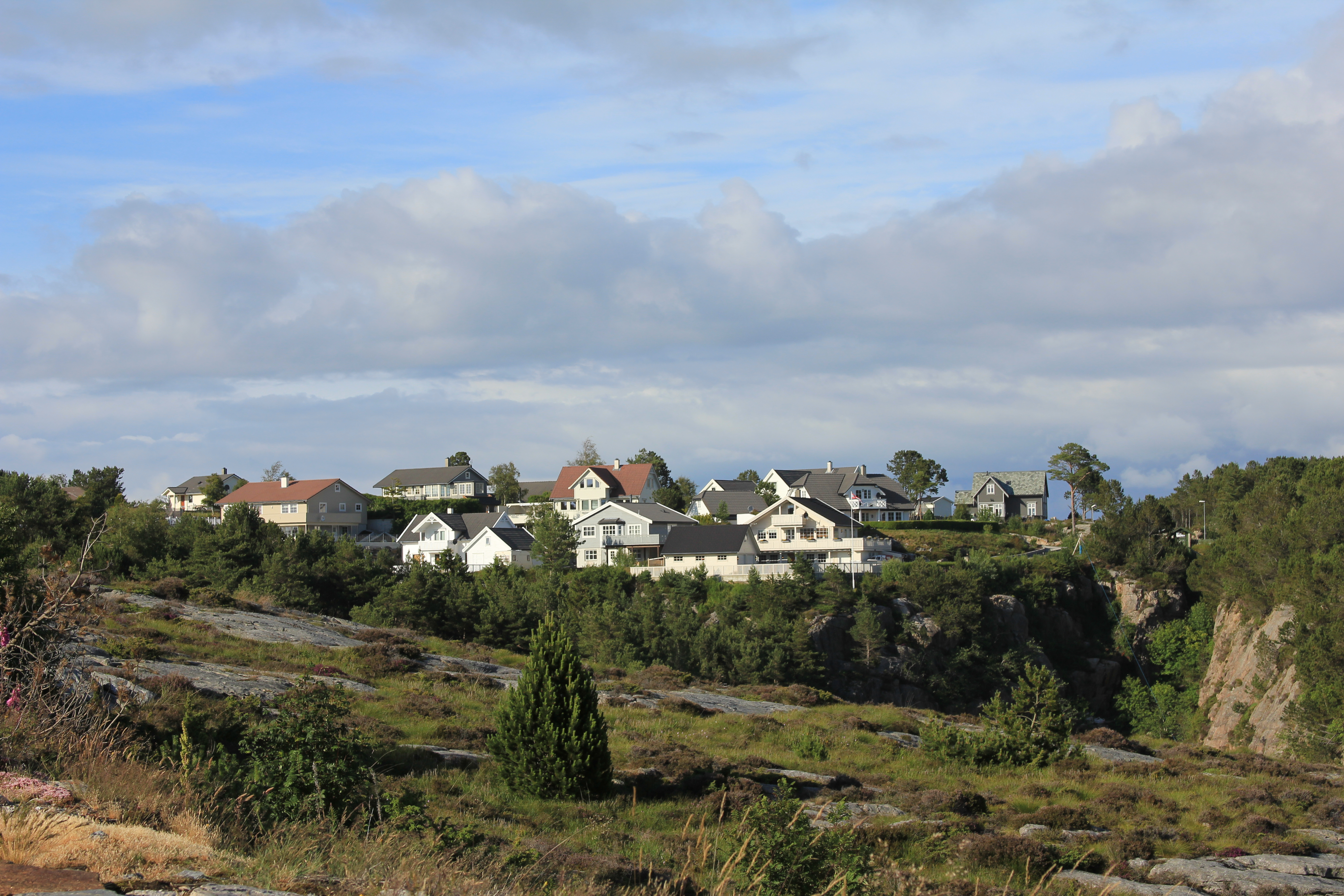
- View of the village
- Interactive map of Vikavågen
- Coordinates: 60.46919°N 4.95838°E
- Country: Norway
- Region: Western Norway
- County: Vestland
- District: Midhordland
- Municipality: Øygarden Municipality

Area
  - Total: 0.46 km^{2} (0.18 sq mi)
- Elevation: 5 m (16 ft)

Population (2025)
  - Total: 639
  - Density: 1,389/km^{2} (3,600/sq mi)
- Time zone: UTC+01:00 (CET)
  - Summer (DST): UTC+02:00 (CEST)
- Post Code: 5337 Rong

Vikavågen is a village in Øygarden Municipality in Vestland county, Norway. The village lies on the southeastern coast of the island of Toftøyna. The 0.46-square-kilometre (110-acre) village has a population (2025) of 639 and a population density of 1,389 inhabitants per square kilometre (3,600/sq mi).
