= Raknes =

Raknes is a surname. Notable people with the surname include:

- Eldbjørg Raknes (born 1970), Norwegian jazz vocalist
- Ola Raknes (1887–1975), Norwegian psychologist, philologist and non-fiction writer
- Steinar Raknes (born 1975), Norwegian jazz musician and composer, brother of Eldbjørg
