= Tungesvik =

Tungesvik is a Norwegian surname. Notable people with the surname include:

- Hans Olav Tungesvik (1936–2017), Norwegian politician
- Steinulf Tungesvik (born 1965), Norwegian jurist and politician
