= Maurstad =

Maurstad is a surname. Notable people with the surname include:

- Alfred Maurstad (1896–1967), Norwegian actor, movie director and theatre manager
- David Maurstad (born 1953), American politician from Nebraska
- Mari Maurstad (born 1957), Norwegian actress
- Toralv Maurstad (1926–2022), Norwegian actor
- Tordis Maurstad (1901–1997), Norwegian actress
