= Steinhovden =

Village in Kinn Municipality, Norway

- Village
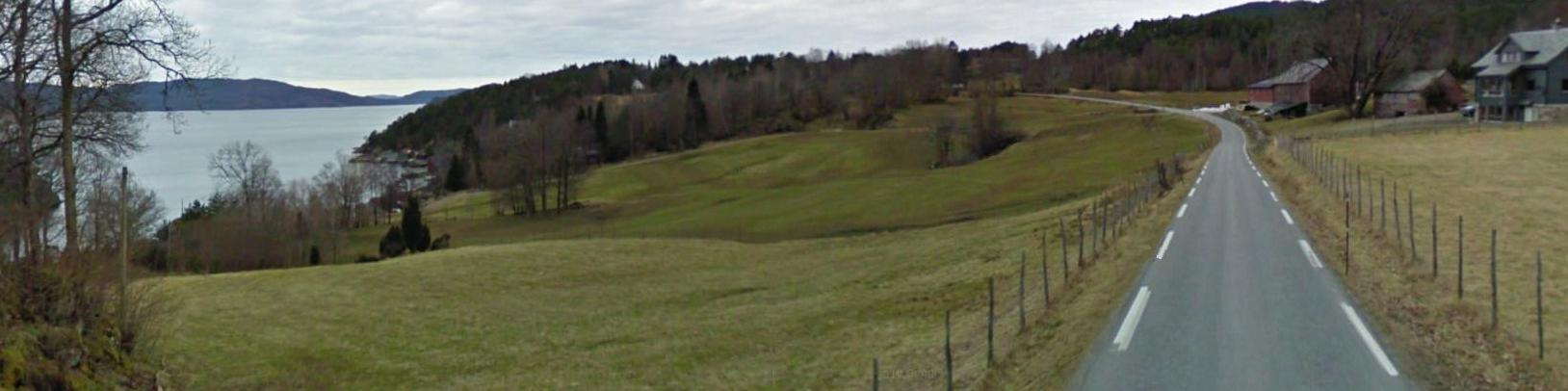
- Interactive map of Steinhovden
- Location within Vestland Location within Norway
- Coordinates: 61.57172°N 5.30461°E
- Country: Norway
- Region: Western Norway
- County: Vestland
- District: Sunnfjord
- Municipality: Kinn Municipality
- Elevation: 31 m (102 ft)

Population (2001)
  - Total: 119
- Time zone: UTC+01:00 (CET)
  - Summer (DST): UTC+02:00 (CEST)
- Post Code: 6940 Eikefjord

Steinhovden is a village with 119 inhabitants in Kinn Municipality in Vestland county, Norway. The village is located along the Høydalsfjorden, about 6 kilometres (3.7 mi) southeast of the village of Nyttingnes and about 10 kilometres (6.2 mi) west of the village of Eikefjord.

The village area is divided into 6 farm areas: Seljeset, Høyvik, Holmesund, Steinhovden, Steinvik and Hopen. The chairman of the area is now trying to get a windmill park built to produce electrical energy for the community. The nearby Skårafjæra area is a popular place for tourists. During the fall hunting season, hunters may go after deer, seal, and whales in the area.

== Sports ==
There are many sporting opportunities in Steinhovden including association football, speed skating, cross-country skiing, swimming, Scuba diving, polo, figure skating, and race walking.

== Notable people ==
- Jarle Steinhovden Political rabulist. He is called The Sledge Hammer. Using a sledgehammer he has turned to silence parking automats in Scandinavia.
- Atle Steinhovden Marine biologist. Salmon Farm Protest Group Chairman in Western Fjords.
- Gunnvar and his windmill Read about his project.
- Alf Steinhovden, radical politician
