= Helgheim =

Village in Sunnfjord Municipality, Norway

- Village
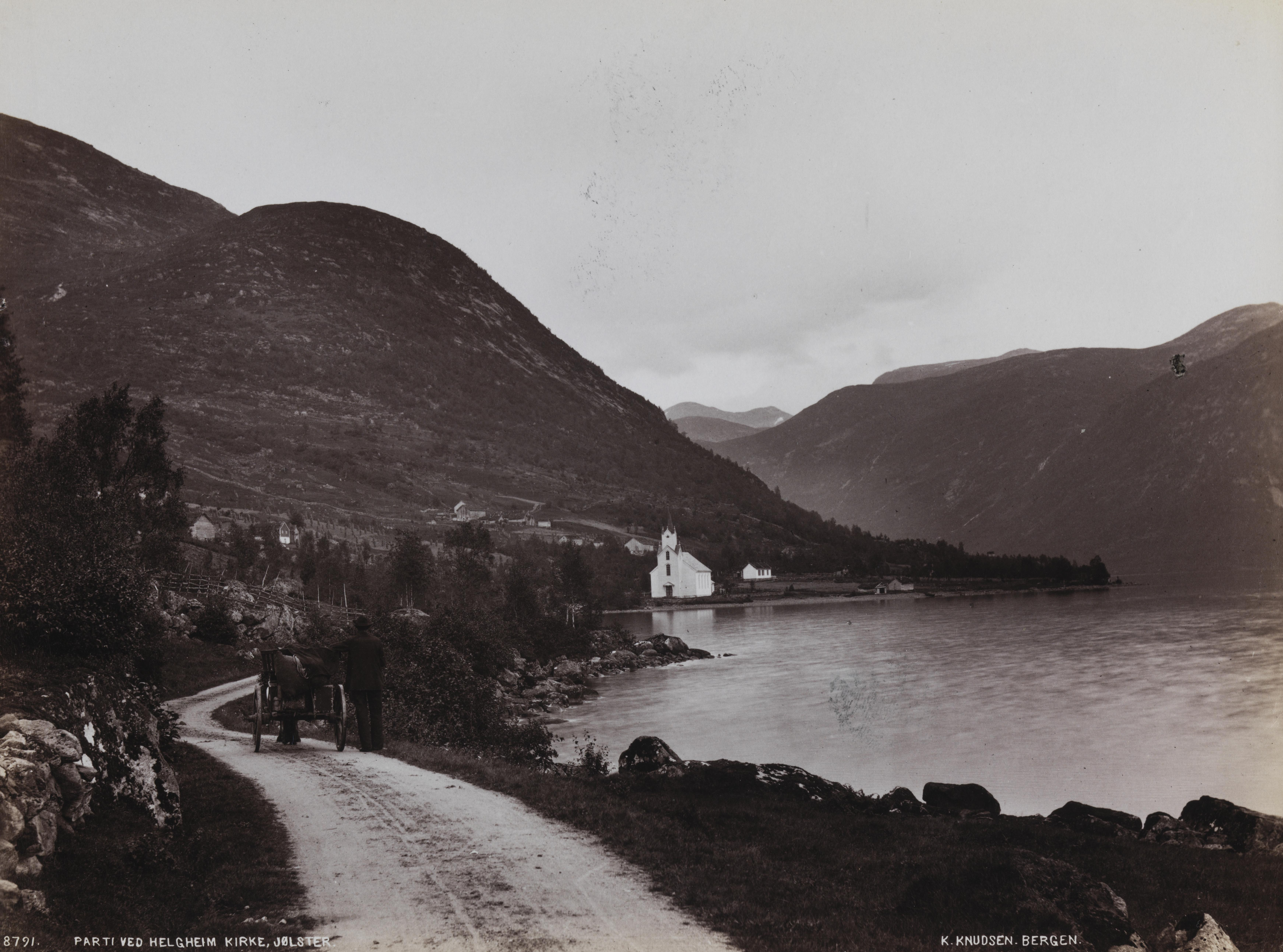
- View of the village
- Interactive map of Helgheim
- Location within Vestland Location within Norway
- Coordinates: 61.56242°N 6.40081°E
- Country: Norway
- Region: Western Norway
- County: Vestland
- District: Sunnfjord
- Municipality: Sunnfjord Municipality
- Elevation: 215 m (705 ft)
- Time zone: UTC+01:00 (CET)
  - Summer (DST): UTC+02:00 (CEST)
- Post Code: 6843 Skei i Jølster

Helgheim is a village in Sunnfjord Municipality in Vestland county, Norway. The village is located on the northern shore of the lake Jølstravatnet, about 4 kilometres (2.5 mi) west of the village of Skei. The village lies along the European route E39 highway. Helgheim Church is located on the lake shore in Helgheim.
