= Takle =

Takle is a surname. Notable people with the surname include:

- Barry Takle (born 1935), Australian rules footballer
- Darien Takle (born 1950), New Zealand actor
