= Dalland =

Dalland is a surname. Notable people with the surname include:

- Birgit Dalland (1907–2007), Norwegian politician
- Bjarne Dalland (1906–1943), Norwegian trade unionist and politician
- Randulf Dalland (1900–1984), Norwegian politician
