= Ølve =

Village in Kvinnherad Municipality, Norway

- Village
- Interactive map of Ølve
- Coordinates: 59.99289°N 5.78507°E
- Country: Norway
- Region: Western Norway
- County: Vestland
- District: Sunnhordland
- Municipality: Kvinnherad Municipality
- Elevation: 14 m (46 ft)
- Time zone: UTC+01:00 (CET)
  - Summer (DST): UTC+02:00 (CEST)
- Post Code: 5637 Ølve

Ølve is a village in Kvinnherad Municipality in Vestland county, Norway. The village is located along the Kvinnheradsfjorden in the western part of the municipality. It is the site of Ølve Church. The village of Husa lies about 3 kilometres (1.9 mi) to the northeast.

Ølve is located near the border with Bjørnafjorden Municipality, and it is across the water from Tysnes Municipality. Ølve is a farming village, but it is also industrial. Today the biggest part of the production is aimed at the food industry, especially salmon processing.

== Mining and geology ==
There have been ten copper mines and two iron mines on the Ølve Peninsula. Mining continued until 1911. The basis for the operation was the rock greenstone. Many of the mines from the more than 300-year-old industry in Norway are associated with greenstone deposits. Ølve goldworks is well known from the years 1855–87, when gold was found at Slagget in Hyttevågen in greenish chlorite shale.

Stone baking slates for making flatbread have been mined and processed at several locations in Ølve and Hatlestranda since around 1100. It is the oldest industry in the area. The slates were used around Norway in large numbers and there is also evidence of exports outside Norway.

On Hamarhaug stone carvings thousands of years old of several ships and a couple of human figures have been discovered. Unfortunately, the main ship carving was cut out and stolen some years ago.
