= Sørheim =

Sørheim is a surname. Notable people with the surname include:

- Atle Ørbeck Sørheim (born 1933), Norwegian veterinarian and civil servant
- Gøran Sørheim (born 1990), Norwegian handball player
- Ingjald Ørbeck Sørheim (1937–2010), Norwegian jurist and politician
- Kari Sørheim (born 1948), Norwegian politician
- Thor Sørheim (born 1949), Norwegian author
