= Flora Municipality =

Former municipality in Sogn og Fjordane, Norway

Flora Municipality Flora kommune
- Former municipality
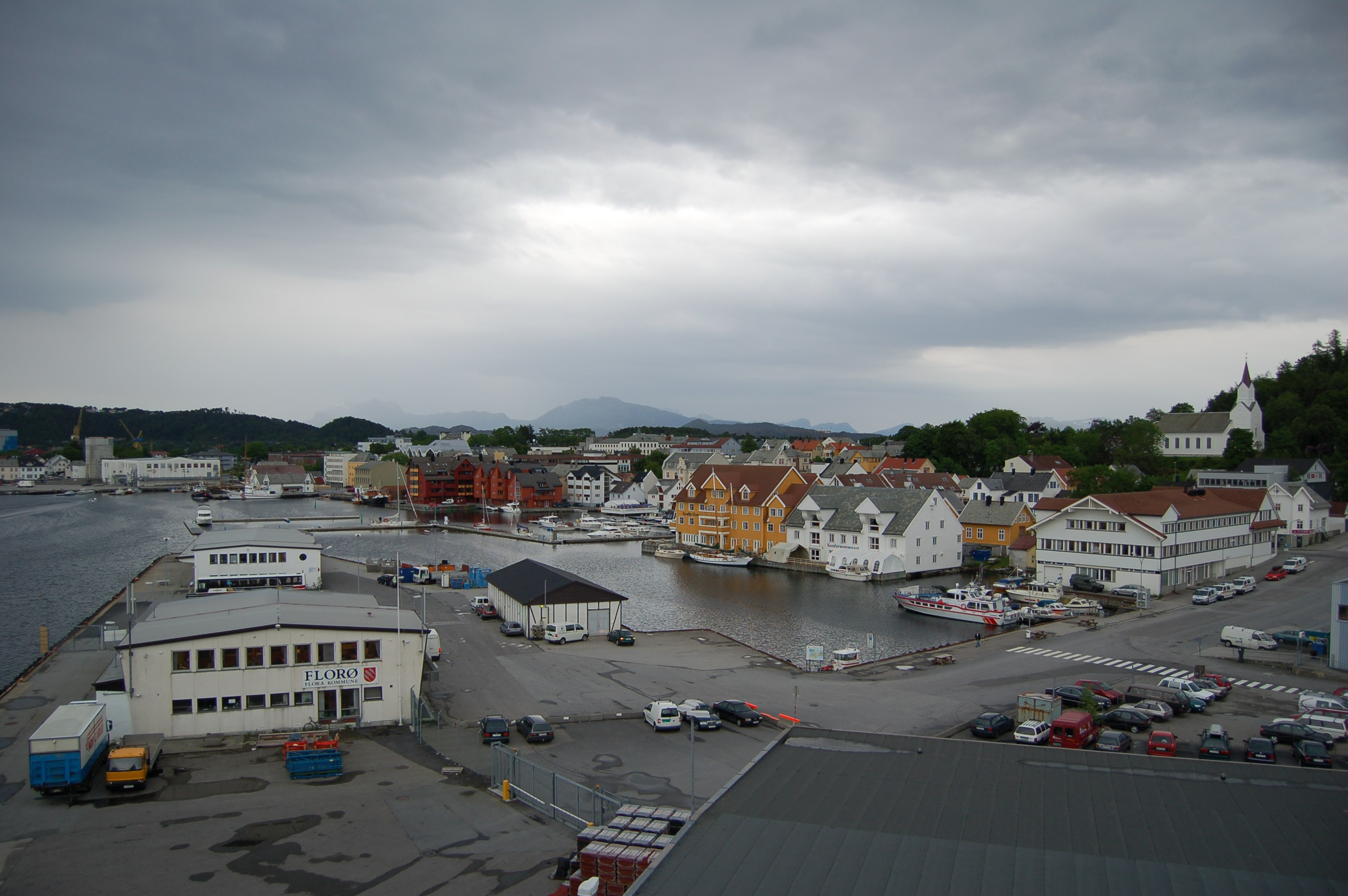
- View of Florø

- Flag Coat of arms

- Sogn og Fjordane within Norway

- Flora within Sogn og Fjordane
- Coordinates: 61°35′15″N 05°16′38″E
- Country: Norway
- County: Sogn og Fjordane
- District: Sunnfjord
- Established: 1 Jan 1964
  - Preceded by: Kinn, Florø, Bru, Eikefjord, and Vevring
- Disestablished: 1 Jan 2020
  - Succeeded by: Kinn Municipality
- Administrative centre: Florø

Government
  - Mayor (2015–2019): Ola Teigen (Ap)

Area (upon dissolution)
  - Total: 693.03 km^{2} (267.58 sq mi)
  - Land: 647.48 km^{2} (249.99 sq mi)
  - Water: 45.55 km^{2} (17.59 sq mi) 6.6%
  - Rank: #163 in Norway
- Highest elevation: 1,385 m (4,544 ft)

Population (2019)
  - Total: 11,852
  - Rank: #99 in Norway
  - Density: 17.1/km^{2} (44/sq mi)
  - Change (10 years): ▲ +3.5%
- Demonym: Floraværing

Official language
  - Norwegian form: Nynorsk
- Time zone: UTC+01:00 (CET)
  - Summer (DST): UTC+02:00 (CEST)
- ISO 3166 code: NO-1401

Flora is a former municipality in the old Sogn og Fjordane county, Norway. The 693-square-kilometre (268 sq mi) municipality existed from 1964 until its dissolution in 2020. The area is now part of Kinn Municipality in the traditional district of Sunnfjord in Vestland county. The administrative centre was the town of Florø (founded in 1860). Other villages in the municipality included Eikefjord, Rognaldsvåg, Stavang, Grov, Norddalsfjord, Nyttingnes, Steinhovden, and Brandsøy.

Prior to its dissolution in 2020, the 693-square-kilometre (268 sq mi) municipality was the 163rd largest by area out of the 422 municipalities in Norway. Flora Municipality was the 99th most populous municipality in Norway with a population of about 11,852. The municipality's population density was 17.1 inhabitants per square kilometre (44/sq mi) and its population had increased by 3.5% over the previous 10-year period.

The municipality stretched from inner fjords where the mountains ascend to the Ålfotbreen glacier, to the outermost islands off the mainland coast. The town of Florø, at its centre, had industries that developed continuously. Trade and industry in Flora were mainly fishing industry, shipyards, and supply for the oil and gas industry in the North Sea.

== General information ==
=== Name ===
Sunset over Flora municipality

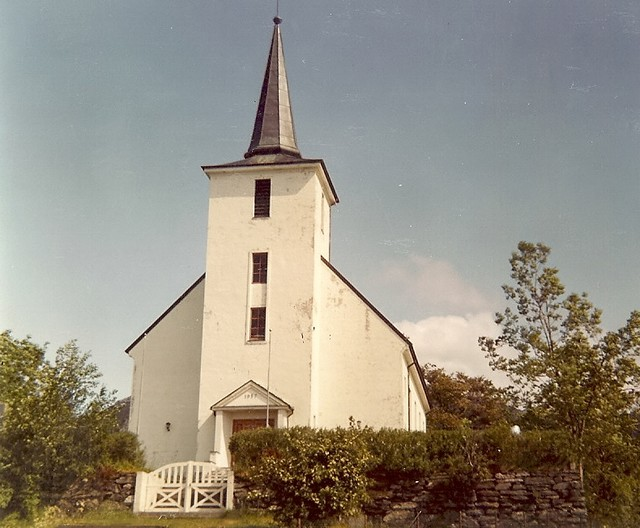
Stavang Church

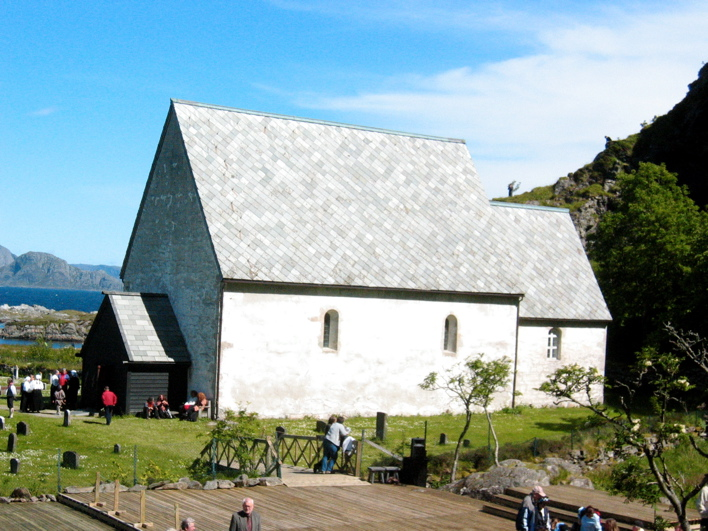
Kinn Church

The municipality is named after the old Flora farm (Old Norse: Flóra) on the island of Brandsøya, near where the town of Florø was built in 1860. The meaning of the name is somewhat uncertain with a couple of different likely possibilities. The old name, is the accusative case/genitive case of the word flórr which means "floor", from which the names Florø and Florelandet are derived. This Old Norse word is probably derived from a Germanic root word, flōraz, meaning "flat ground". Another possibility for the meaning of the name is that it is derived from the word flóð which means "flood" or "deluge". A common misunderstanding is that the name Florø includes the Danish word ø which means "island" as a suffix that was attached to the farm name Flora. Although not true, it almost led to the town being renamed Florøy in the 1930s.

=== Coat of arms ===
The coat of arms was granted on 19 February 1960 for the town of Florø. A few years later on 1 January 1964, the new Flora Municipality was created, including the town of Florø. On 6 October 1967, the old arms of Florø were granted as the arms for Flora Municipality. These arms were in use until 1 January 2020 when the municipality was dissolved. The official blazon is "Gules, three herrings bendwise argent" (Norwegian: På raud botn tre sølv sildar i skrå-stilling). This means the arms have a red field (background) and the charge is a set of three diagonal herring. The charge has a tincture of argent which means it is commonly colored white, but if it is made out of metal, then silver is used. The three herrings are a symbol for the great local importance of herring fishing for the development and economy of Flora. The arms were designed by Hallvard Trætteberg. The municipal flag has the same design as the coat of arms.

=== Background ===
The old Kinn Municipality was established as a municipality on 1 January 1838 (see formannskapsdistrikt law). The original municipality was identical to the Kinn parish (prestegjeld) with the sub-parishes (sokn) of Bru, Kinn Municipality, and Bremanger.

On 3 January 1861, the village area of Florø (population: 846) was established as a ladested (port town) by royal decree, which removed it from the rural Kinn Municipality and it became an independent Florø Municipality. This left Kinn Municipality with 6,531 residents. On 1 January 1866, the northern district of Kinn Municipality (population: 1,852) was separated to become the new Bremanger Municipality. After the split, Kinn Municipality was left with 4,679 inhabitants. On 1 January 1923, Kinn Municipality was divided into three separate municipalities: the western (island) area was Kinn Municipality (population: 2,508); the central (mostly mainland) area was Bru Municipality (population: 1,560); and the southeasternmost inland area was Eikefjord Municipality (population: 929).

During the 1960s, there were many municipal mergers across Norway due to the work of the Schei Committee. On 1 January 1964, the new Flora Municipality (population: 7,715) was created upon the merger of the following areas:

- the town of Florø (population: 2,040)
- all of Eikefjord Municipality (population: 919)
- all of Kinn Municipality (population: 3,567)
- the parts of Bru Municipality that were located north of the Førdefjorden (population: 1,155)
- the Steindal area of Vevring Municipality (population: 25)
- the Husefest and Breivik farms of Bremanger Municipality (population: 9)

On 1 January 2020, Flora Municipality was merged with most of the old Vågsøy Municipality to form a new Kinn Municipality. This non-contiguous municipality is separated by Bremanger Municipality, making it the only non-contiguous municipality in Norway.

=== Churches ===
The Church of Norway had four parishes (sokn) within Flora Municipality. It was part of the Sunnfjord prosti (deanery) in the Diocese of Bjørgvin.

Churches in Flora Municipality
Parish (sokn)	Church name	Location of the church	Year built
Bru	Askrova Chapel	Askrova	1957
Bru	Stavang Church	Stavang	1957
Eikefjord	Eikefjord Church	Eikefjord	1812
Kinn	Batalden Chapel	Fanøya	1907
Kinn	Florø Church	Florø	1882
Kinn	Kinn Church	Kinn	12th century
Nordal	Nordal Church	Norddalsfjord	1898

== Government ==
While it existed, Flora Municipality was responsible for primary education (through 10th grade), outpatient health services, senior citizen services, welfare and other social services, zoning, economic development, and municipal roads and utilities. The municipality was governed by a municipal council of directly elected representatives. The mayor was indirectly elected by a vote of the municipal council. The municipality was under the jurisdiction of the Sogn og Fjordane District Court and the Gulating Court of Appeal.

=== Municipal council ===
The municipal council (Kommunestyre) of Flora Municipality was made up of 31 representatives that were elected to four year terms. The tables below show the historical composition of the council by political party.

Flora kommunestyre 2015–2019
Party name (in Nynorsk)	Number of representatives
Labour Party (Arbeidarpartiet)	11
Progress Party (Framstegspartiet)	1
Green Party (Miljøpartiet Dei Grøne)	1
Conservative Party (Høgre)	7
Christian Democratic Party (Kristeleg Folkeparti)	1
Centre Party (Senterpartiet)	1
Socialist Left Party (Sosialistisk Venstreparti)	1
Liberal Party (Venstre)	3
Common List (Samlingslista)	5
Total number of members:	31
Note: On 1 January 2020, Flora Municipality became part of Kinn Municipality.

Flora kommunestyre 2011–2015
Party name (in Nynorsk)	Number of representatives
Labour Party (Arbeidarpartiet)	12
Progress Party (Framstegspartiet)	2
Conservative Party (Høgre)	13
Christian Democratic Party (Kristeleg Folkeparti)	1
Centre Party (Senterpartiet)	1
Socialist Left Party (Sosialistisk Venstreparti)	1
Liberal Party (Venstre)	5
Total number of members:	35

Flora kommunestyre 2007–2011
Party name (in Nynorsk)	Number of representatives
Labour Party (Arbeidarpartiet)	12
Progress Party (Framstegspartiet)	5
Conservative Party (Høgre)	6
Christian Democratic Party (Kristeleg Folkeparti)	1
Centre Party (Senterpartiet)	2
Socialist Left Party (Sosialistisk Venstreparti)	3
Liberal Party (Venstre)	5
Flora Democratic Solidarity (Flora Demokratiske Solidaritet)	1
Total number of members:	35

Flora kommunestyre 2003–2007
Party name (in Nynorsk)	Number of representatives
Labour Party (Arbeidarpartiet)	17
Progress Party (Framstegspartiet)	4
Conservative Party (Høgre)	8
Christian Democratic Party (Kristeleg Folkeparti)	2
Centre Party (Senterpartiet)	3
Socialist Left Party (Sosialistisk Venstreparti)	5
Liberal Party (Venstre)	6
Total number of members:	45

Flora kommunestyre 1999–2003
Party name (in Nynorsk)	Number of representatives
Labour Party (Arbeidarpartiet)	21
Progress Party (Framstegspartiet)	2
Conservative Party (Høgre)	9
Christian Democratic Party (Kristeleg Folkeparti)	3
Centre Party (Senterpartiet)	2
Socialist Left Party (Sosialistisk Venstreparti)	3
Liberal Party (Venstre)	5
Total number of members:	45

Flora kommunestyre 1995–1999
Party name (in Nynorsk)	Number of representatives
Labour Party (Arbeidarpartiet)	19
Conservative Party (Høgre)	10
Christian Democratic Party (Kristeleg Folkeparti)	3
Centre Party (Senterpartiet)	3
Socialist Left Party (Sosialistisk Venstreparti)	3
Liberal Party (Venstre)	7
Total number of members:	45

Flora kommunestyre 1991–1995
Party name (in Nynorsk)	Number of representatives
Labour Party (Arbeidarpartiet)	16
Progress Party (Framstegspartiet)	1
Conservative Party (Høgre)	9
Christian Democratic Party (Kristeleg Folkeparti)	3
Centre Party (Senterpartiet)	4
Socialist Left Party (Sosialistisk Venstreparti)	7
Liberal Party (Venstre)	5
Total number of members:	45

Flora kommunestyre 1987–1991
Party name (in Nynorsk)	Number of representatives
Labour Party (Arbeidarpartiet)	14
Conservative Party (Høgre)	17
Christian Democratic Party (Kristeleg Folkeparti)	3
Centre Party (Senterpartiet)	3
Socialist Left Party (Sosialistisk Venstreparti)	5
Liberal Party (Venstre)	3
Total number of members:	45

Flora kommunestyre 1983–1987
Party name (in Nynorsk)	Number of representatives
Labour Party (Arbeidarpartiet)	14
Conservative Party (Høgre)	16
Christian Democratic Party (Kristeleg Folkeparti)	4
Centre Party (Senterpartiet)	3
Socialist Left Party (Sosialistisk Venstreparti)	5
Liberal Party (Venstre)	3
Total number of members:	45

Flora kommunestyre 1979–1983
Party name (in Nynorsk)	Number of representatives
Labour Party (Arbeidarpartiet)	10
Conservative Party (Høgre)	12
Christian Democratic Party (Kristeleg Folkeparti)	5
New People's Party (Nye Folkepartiet)	1
Centre Party (Senterpartiet)	4
Socialist Left Party (Sosialistisk Venstreparti)	7
Liberal Party (Venstre)	6
Total number of members:	45

Flora kommunestyre 1975–1979
Party name (in Nynorsk)	Number of representatives
Labour Party (Arbeidarpartiet)	9
Conservative Party (Høgre)	6
Christian Democratic Party (Kristeleg Folkeparti)	6
New People's Party (Nye Folkepartiet)	1
Centre Party (Senterpartiet)	5
Socialist Left Party (Sosialistisk Venstreparti)	10
Liberal Party (Venstre)	8
Total number of members:	45

Flora kommunestyre 1971–1975
Party name (in Nynorsk)	Number of representatives
Labour Party (Arbeidarpartiet)	5
Conservative Party (Høgre)	2
Christian Democratic Party (Kristeleg Folkeparti)	3
Centre Party (Senterpartiet)	4
Socialist People's Party (Sosialistisk Folkeparti)	1
Liberal Party (Venstre)	4
Local List(s) (Lokale lister)	26
Total number of members:	45

Flora kommunestyre 1967–1971
Party name (in Nynorsk)	Number of representatives
Labour Party (Arbeidarpartiet)	19
Conservative Party (Høgre)	6
Christian Democratic Party (Kristeleg Folkeparti)	4
Centre Party (Senterpartiet)	5
Socialist People's Party (Sosialistisk Folkeparti)	1
Liberal Party (Venstre)	10
Total number of members:	45

Flora kommunestyre 1964–1967
Party name (in Nynorsk)	Number of representatives
Labour Party (Arbeidarpartiet)	18
Conservative Party (Høgre)	7
Christian Democratic Party (Kristeleg Folkeparti)	4
Centre Party (Senterpartiet)	6
Liberal Party (Venstre)	10
Total number of members:	45

=== Mayors ===
The mayor (Nynorsk: ordførar) of Flora Municipality was the political leader of the municipality and the chairperson of the municipal council. The following people have held this position:

- 1964–1971: Odd Færøyvik (V)
- 1972–1975: Mons Monsen (LL)
- 1976–1979: Ludvig Botnen (V)
- 1980–1985: Dagfinn Hjertenes (H)
- 1986–1987: Odd Husebø (H)
- 1988–1989: Dagfinn Hjertenes (H)
- 1990–1991: Odd Husebø (H)
- 1992–2003: Kolbjørn Dyrli (Ap)
- 2003–2011: Bente Frøyen Steindal (Ap)
- 2011–2015: Bengt Solheim-Olsen (H)
- 2015–2019: Ola Teigen (Ap)

== Geography ==
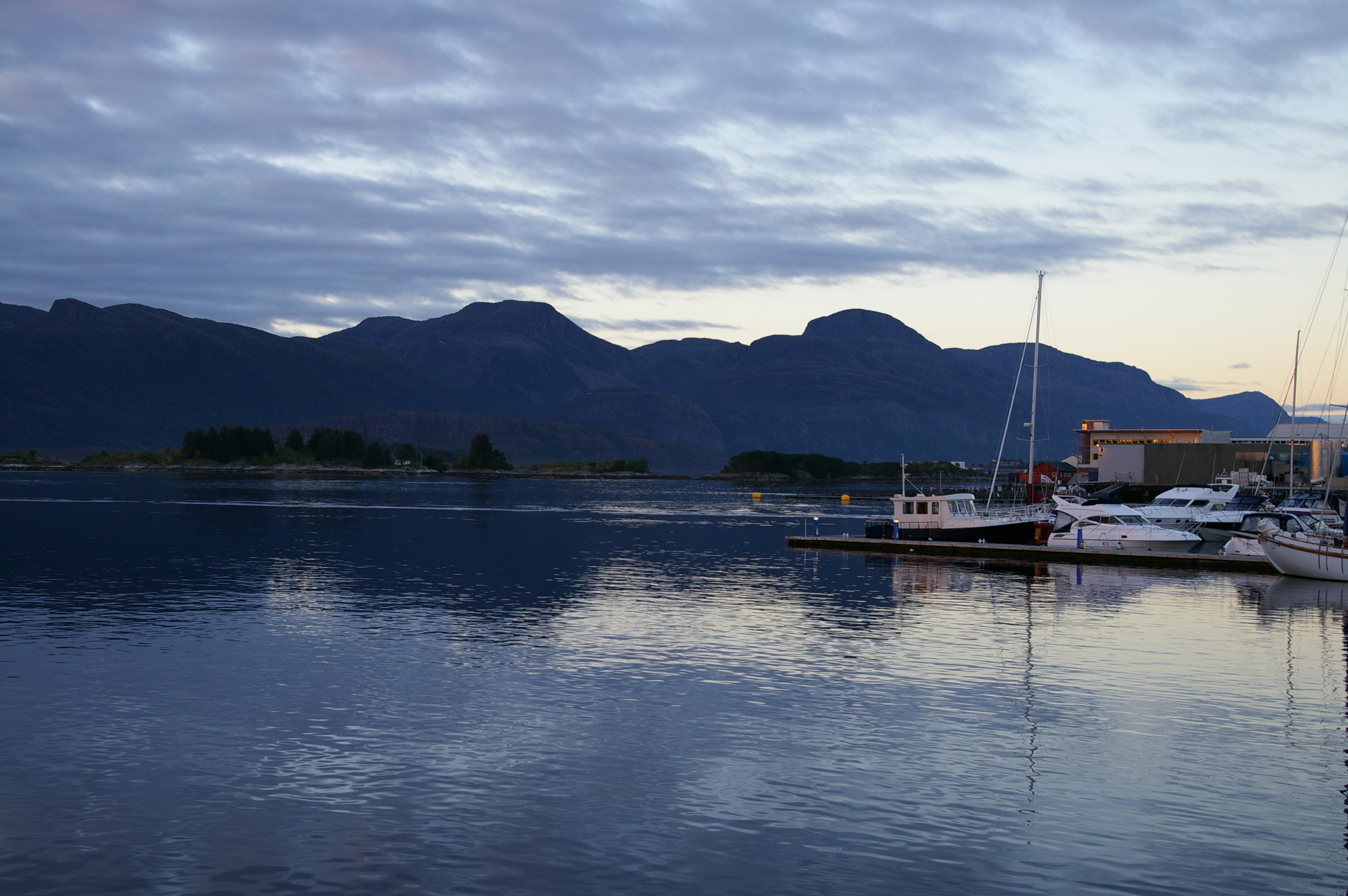
Botnafjorden

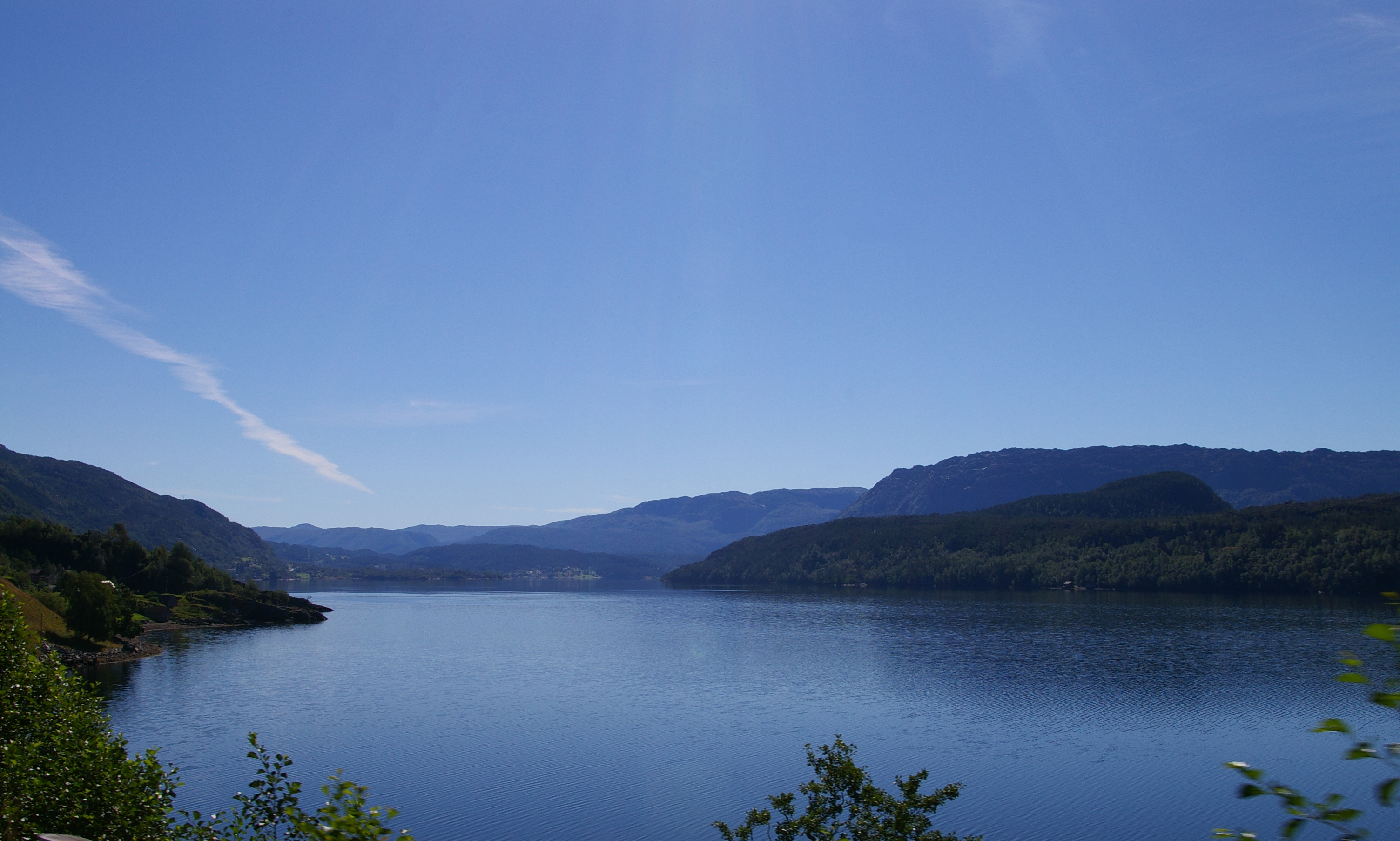
Eikefjorden

Flora was located in the western central part of Sogn og Fjordane county. To the west, it was bordered by the North Sea, to the north it was bordered by Bremanger Municipality, to the east by Gloppen Municipality, and to the south by Naustdal Municipality and Askvoll Municipality. Flora Municipality included many islands, including Reksta, Askrova, Svanøya, Skorpa, Fanøya, Hovden, and Kinn. The municipality also included the large lakes of Endestadvatnet, Lykkjebøvatnet, and Vassetevatnet. The highest point in the municipality was the 1,385-metre (4,544 ft) tall Ålfotbreen glacier. The Norddalsfjorden flowed through the northern part of the municipality, and it was crossed by the Norddalsfjord Bridge.

== Attractions ==
=== Kinn ===
Off the coast is the grassy island of Kinn. The area around Kinn was the central herring area in Norway for the most part of the 19th century. At the height, there lived approximately 15,000 people on Kinn and the surrounding islands in the herring season. Today, there are 15 inhabitants on Kinn.

On the island of Kinn, on the edge of the ocean lies the historic Kinn Church from the 12th century. The church, built in Romanesque style, is the oldest church in the Sunnfjord region. It has long been associated with the legend of St. Sunniva. The church choir is the oldest part of the church, and the lectern is the only preserved example of its kind in Scandinavia.

Every year during the third weekend in June, the Kinna Pageant is an historical play about love, hate, fidelity and loyalty to the church and humankind. About 150 actors take part, and audiences of several thousand tourists visit the island to watch the play.

=== Svanøy ===
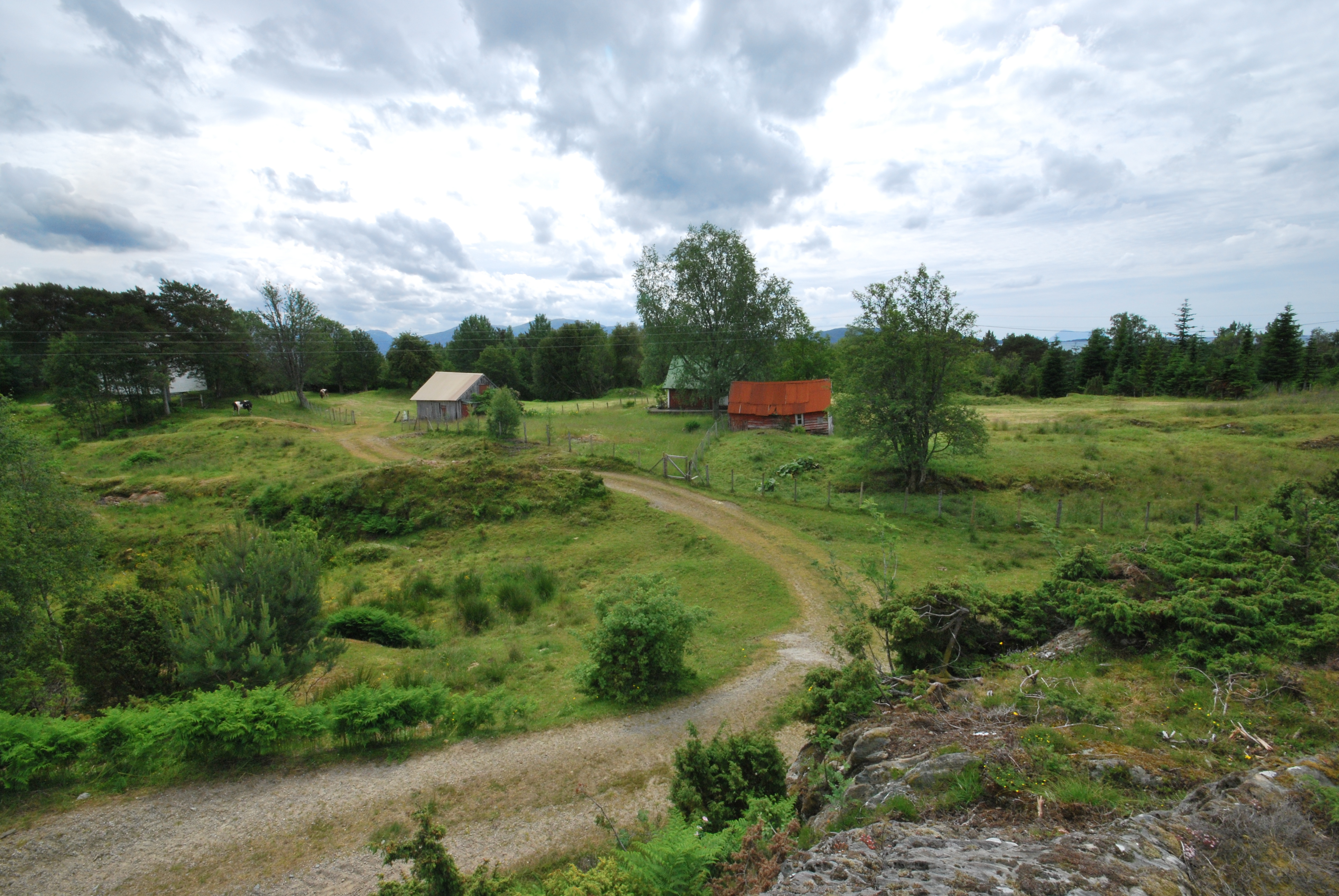
View of the island of Stavøya

Svanøya is the southernmost and greenest island in the municipality. The island was the district's most important trade centre last century, and exports and shipping were major activities. A stone cross memorial commemorating King Olav the Holy and a sacrificial site from the Viking Age can be found here.

The Svanøy Estate is an old seat of nobility from 1685. It includes 62 acres (250,000 m^{2}) of cultivated land and 30 acres (120,000 m^{2}) of woodland, as well as a garden.

=== Eirikstad Farm ===
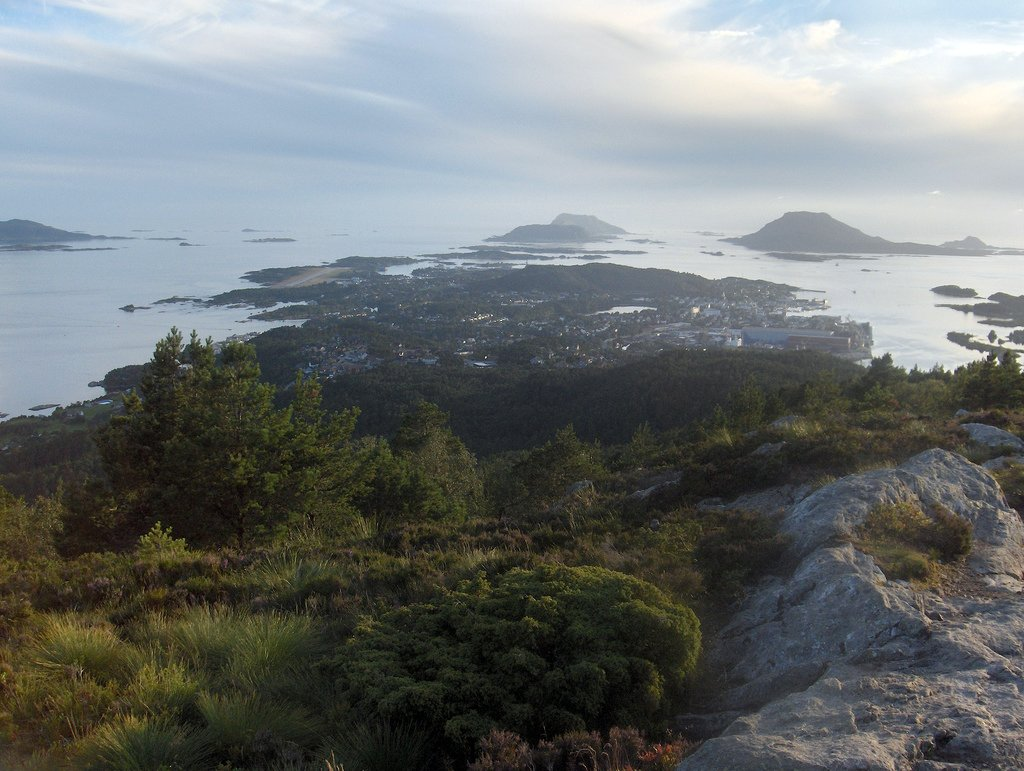
View of the town of Florø

The Saga says that the Viking King Eirik Blodøks grew up here, hence the name. It contains a museum with old farming tools. Fjord horses are bred and trained here.

=== Batalden Boathouse ===
Norway's westernmost art gallery is housed in a restored fishing building on Batalden. Regular painting and drawing courses are held.

=== Troll Cave ===
Trollhola, a prehistoric cave, is located on the island of Askrova. The main cavern is the size of a cathedral, has several passages leading from it. The highest point of the island, 233 metres (764 ft) above sea level, provides a view of the archipelago.

=== Rock Carvings ===
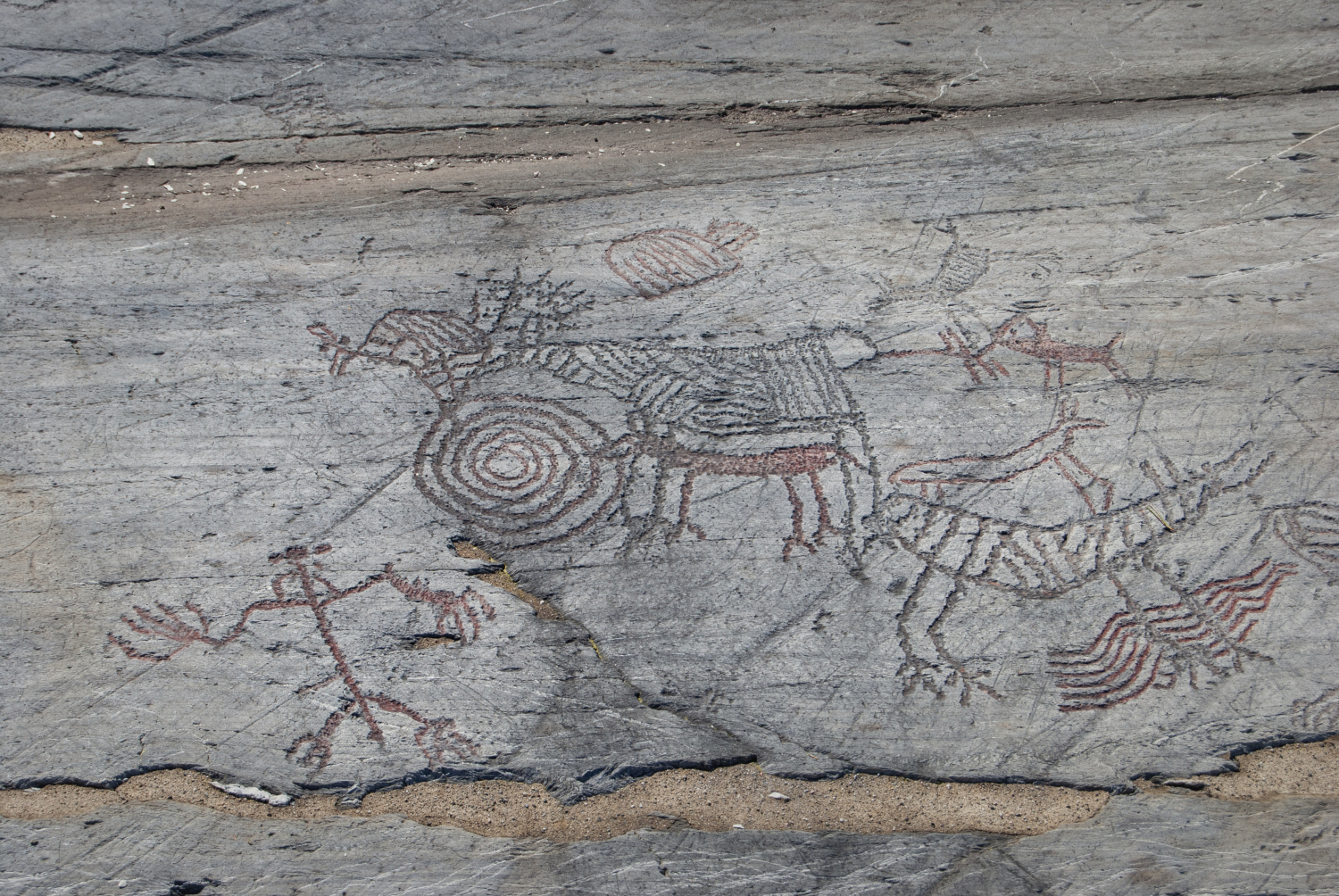
Rock art at Ausevika

In Ausevika, which is 41 kilometres (25 mi) south of Florø, lies one of the largest rock carving sites in Norway. The site has over 300 carvings depicting both animal and human figures, some of which are 3,000 years old.

=== Coastal Museum ===
The Coastal Museum in Sogn og Fjordane county was established in 1980. The aim was to concentrate on coastal nature and culture both past and present. Old boat houses and domestic dwellings were moved from various places in the district and re-erected in Florø near the museum. The 250-year old Holmedalsjekta (coastal freighter) is Norway's oldest non-Viking ship. A large exhibition on North Sea oil, Snorreankeret, based on the Snorre platform is located in the museum.

=== Lighthouses ===
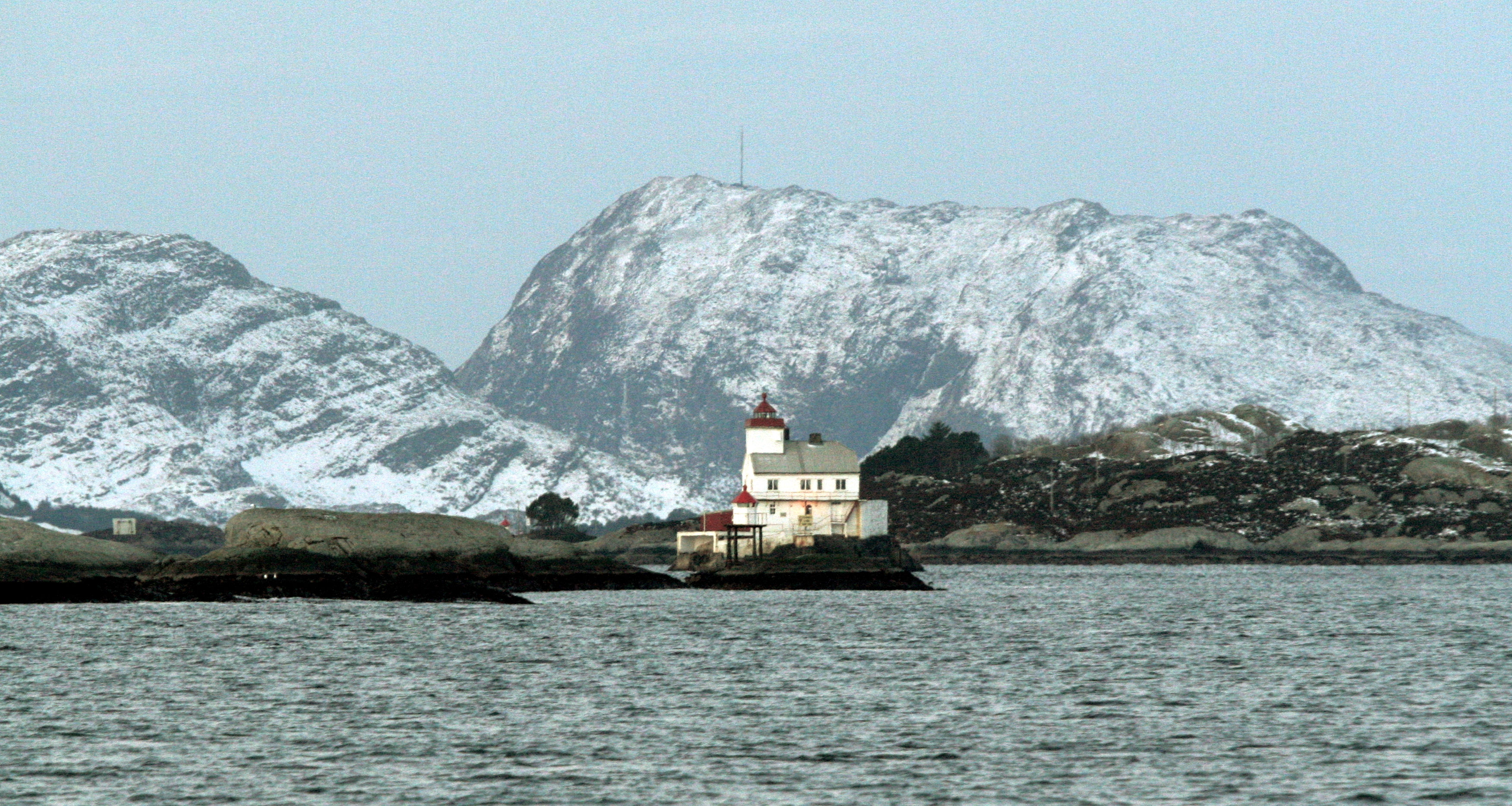
Stabben lighthouse

The waters around Florø are dangerous and exposed. Three lighthouses were built in the fairways to the town at an early date. Two of them, Stabben Lighthouse and Kvanhovden Lighthouse are now automated and unstaffed. The third and largest, Ytterøyane Lighthouse, is still staffed. There are many shallow areas in the waters west of Florø. Several shipwrecks are located beneath these waters, which attract divers.

== Sports ==
Local sport teams include Florø TIF and Florø SK.

== Notable people ==
- Ivar Lykke Falch Lind, a jurist and politician in both Kinn Municipality and Vevring Municipality

== See also ==
- List of former municipalities of Norway
