= Eikefjord Municipality =

Former municipality in Sogn og Fjordane, Norway

Eikefjord Municipality Eikefjord herad
- Former municipality
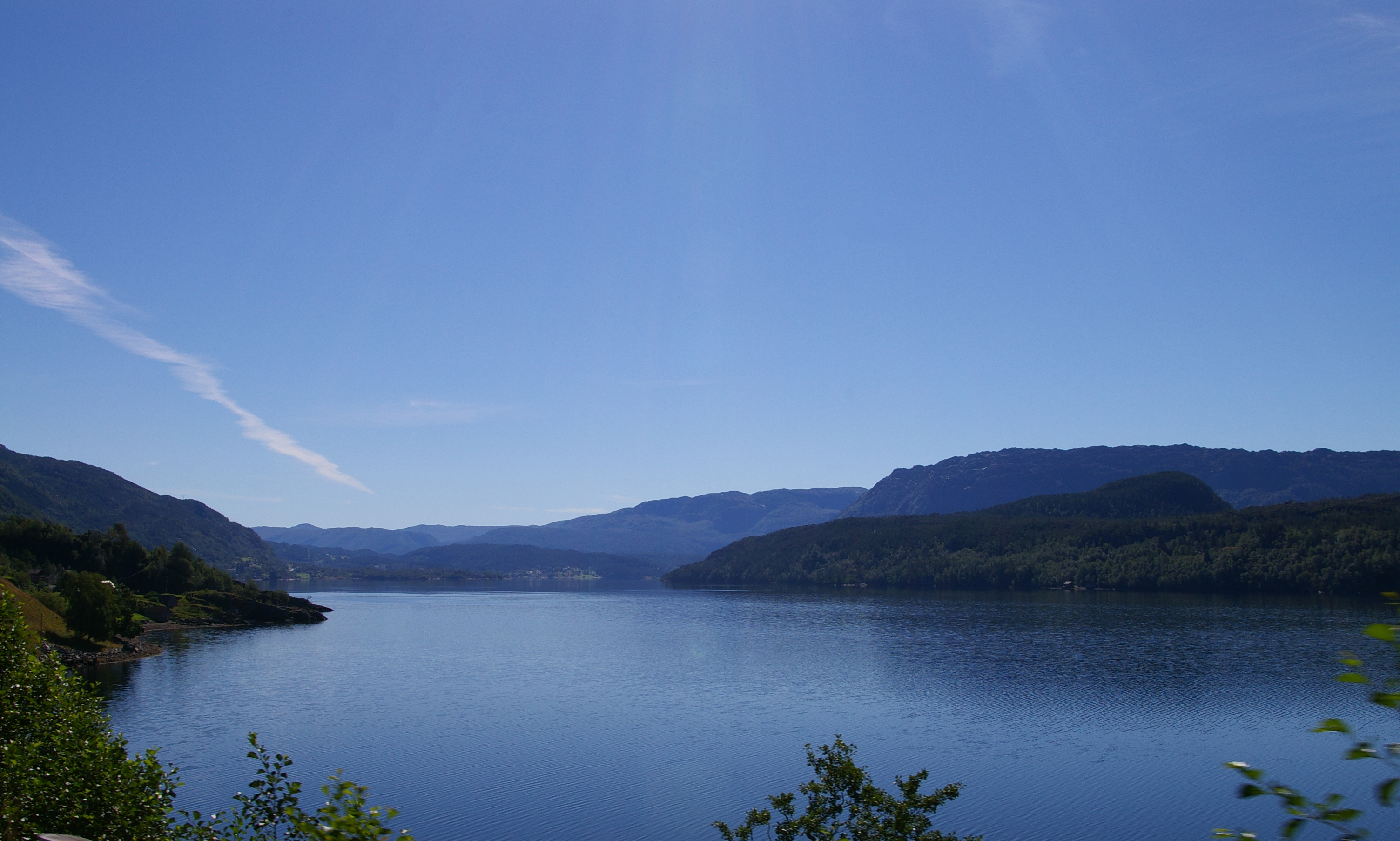
- View of the Eikefjorden

- Sogn og Fjordane within Norway

- Eikefjord within Sogn og Fjordane
- Coordinates: 61°35′04″N 05°27′29″E
- Country: Norway
- County: Sogn og Fjordane
- District: Sunnfjord
- Established: 1 Jan 1923
  - Preceded by: Kinn_Municipality_
- Disestablished: 1 Jan 1964
  - Succeeded by: Flora Municipality
- Administrative centre: Eikefjord

Government
  - Mayor (1962–1963): Alf Svarthumle

Area (upon dissolution)
  - Total: 168.2 km^{2} (64.9 sq mi)
  - Rank: #413 in Norway
- Highest elevation: 1,021 m (3,350 ft)

Population (1963)
  - Total: 946
  - Rank: #620 in Norway
  - Density: 5.6/km^{2} (15/sq mi)
  - Change (10 years): ▼ −8.3%

Official language
  - Norwegian form: Nynorsk
- Time zone: UTC+01:00 (CET)
  - Summer (DST): UTC+02:00 (CEST)
- ISO 3166 code: NO-1435

Eikefjord is a former municipality in the old Sogn og Fjordane county, Norway. The 168.2-square-kilometre (64.9 sq mi) municipality existed from 1923 until its dissolution in 1964. The area is now part of Kinn Municipality in the traditional district of Sunnfjord in Vestland county. The administrative centre was the village of Eikefjord where Eikefjord Church is located.

Prior to its dissolution in 1964, the 168.2-square-kilometre (64.9 sq mi) municipality was the 413th largest by area out of the 689 municipalities in Norway. Eikefjord Municipality was the 620th most populous municipality in Norway with a population of about 946. The municipality's population density was 5.6 inhabitants per square kilometre (15/sq mi) and its population had decreased by 8.3% over the previous 10-year period.

== General information ==
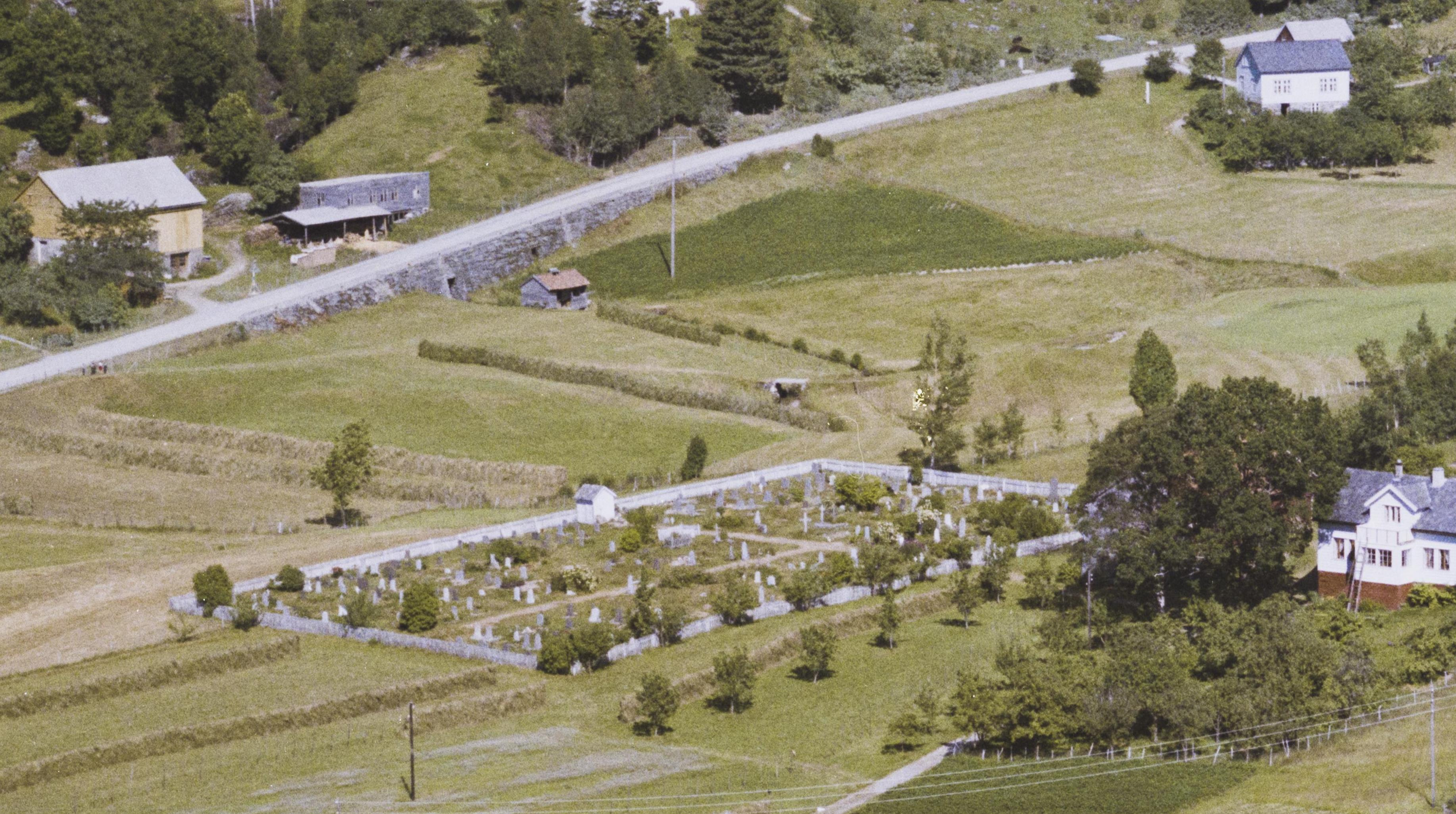
Eikefjord in 1962

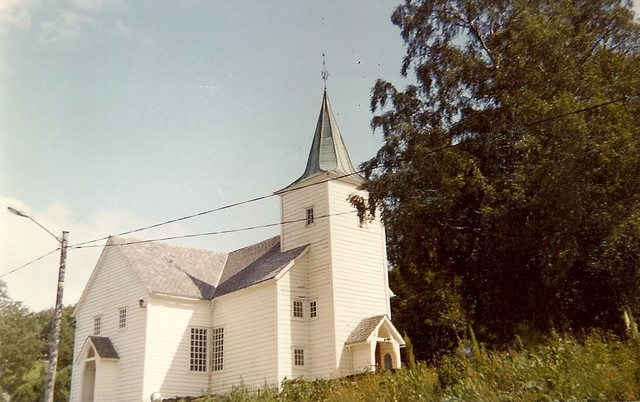
Eikefjord Church

The parish of Eikefjord was established as a municipality on 1 January 1923, when the old Kinn Municipality was split into three separate municipalities as follows:

- the new Eikefjord Municipality (population: 929), which included the eastern district around the eastern end of the Eikefjorden and around the village of Eikefjord
- the new Bru Municipality (population: 1,560), which included the southern islands of Svanøya and Askrova, a small mainland area south of the Førdefjorden, the area around the village of Stavang, and the large valley east of the village of Norddalsfjord
- a much smaller Kinn Municipality (population: 2,508), which included the western islands and the mainland areas surrounding, but not including, the port town of Florø

During the 1960s, there were many municipal mergers across Norway due to the work of the Schei Committee. On 1 January 1964, the new Flora Municipality was created by merging the following areas:

- the ladested of Florø (population: 2,040)
- all of Eikefjord Municipality (population: 919)
- all of Kinn Municipality (population: 3,567)
- the parts of Bru Municipality that were located north of the Førdefjorden (population: 1,155)
- the villages of Husefest and Breivik in Bremanger Municipality (population: 9)
- the Steindal valley area in Vevring Municipality (population: 25)

=== Name ===
The municipality (originally the parish) is named after the old Eikefjord farm (Old Norse: Eikifjǫrðr) since the first Eikefjord Church was built there. The farm was named after the local fjord. The first element comes form the word eik which means "oak". The last element is fjǫrðr which means "fjord" or "firth".

=== Churches ===
The Church of Norway had one parish (sokn) within Eikefjord Municipality. At the time of the municipal dissolution, it was part of the Kinn prestegjeld and the Sunnfjord prosti (deanery) in the Diocese of Bjørgvin.

Churches in Eikefjord Municipality
Parish (sokn)	Church name	Location of the church	Year built
Eikefjord	Eikefjord Church	Eikefjord	1812

== Geography ==
The municipality of Eikefjord was located at the end of the Eikefjorden, about 30 kilometres (19 mi) east of the town of Florø. The lake Endestadvatnet was part of the municipality. The municipality encompassed the immediate area around the village of Eikefjord and to the east and south of the village. The highest point in the municipality was the 1,021-metre (3,350 ft) tall mountain Blånipa, located on the border with Bru Municipality. Bru Municipality was located to the north, west, and southwest; Vevring Municipality was located to the south, Askvoll Municipality was located to the south, Naustdal Municipality was located to the southeast, and Gloppen Municipality was located to the east.

== Government ==
While it existed, Eikefjord Municipality was responsible for primary education (through 10th grade), outpatient health services, senior citizen services, welfare and other social services, zoning, economic development, and municipal roads and utilities. The municipality was governed by a municipal council of directly elected representatives. The mayor was indirectly elected by a vote of the municipal council. The municipality was under the jurisdiction of the Gulating Court of Appeal.

=== Municipal council ===
The municipal council (Heradsstyre) of Eikefjord Municipality was made up of 13 representatives that were elected to four year terms. The tables below show the historical composition of the council by political party.

Eikefjord heradsstyre 1959–1963
Party name (in Nynorsk)	Number of representatives
Labour Party (Arbeidarpartiet)	5
Christian Democratic Party (Kristeleg Folkeparti)	1
Centre Party (Senterpartiet)	3
Liberal Party (Venstre)	3
Local List(s) (Lokale lister)	1
Total number of members:	13
Note: On 1 January 1964, Eikefjord Municipality became part of Flora Municipality.

Eikefjord heradsstyre 1955–1959
Party name (in Nynorsk)	Number of representatives
Labour Party (Arbeidarpartiet)	5
Liberal Party (Venstre)	3
Joint List(s) of Non-Socialist Parties (Borgarlege Felleslister)	5
Total number of members:	13

Eikefjord heradsstyre 1951–1955
Party name (in Nynorsk)	Number of representatives
Labour Party (Arbeidarpartiet)	5
Joint list of the Farmers' Party (Bondepartiet) and the Liberal Party (Venstre)	4
Joint List(s) of Non-Socialist Parties (Borgarlege Felleslister)	3
Total number of members:	12

Eikefjord heradsstyre 1947–1951
Party name (in Nynorsk)	Number of representatives
Labour Party (Arbeidarpartiet)	4
Liberal Party (Venstre)	5
Joint List(s) of Non-Socialist Parties (Borgarlege Felleslister)	3
Total number of members:	12

Eikefjord heradsstyre 1945–1947
Party name (in Nynorsk)	Number of representatives
Local List(s) (Lokale lister)	12
Total number of members:	12

Eikefjord heradsstyre 1937–1941*
Party name (in Nynorsk)	Number of representatives
Labour Party (Arbeidarpartiet)	4
Liberal Party (Venstre)	5
Joint List(s) of Non-Socialist Parties (Borgarlege Felleslister)	3
Total number of members:	12
Note: Due to the German occupation of Norway during World War II, no elections were held for new municipal councils until after the war ended in 1945.

=== Mayors ===
The mayor (Nynorsk: ordførar) of Eikefjord Municipality was the political leader of the municipality and the chairperson of the municipal council. The following people have held this position:

- 1923–1925: Henrik Svarthumle
- 1926–1928: Kristoffer Langedal
- 1929–1934: Abraham Storøy
- 1935–1940: Ludvig Langedal
- 1941–1945: Leiv Vasset
- 1945–1945: Ludvig Langedal
- 1946–1959: Alf Svarthumle
- 1960–1961: Erik Dreyer Hovland
- 1962–1963: Alf Svarthumle

== See also ==
- List of former municipalities of Norway
