= Bru Municipality =

Former municipality in Sogn og Fjordane, Norway

Bru Municipality Bru herad
- Former municipality
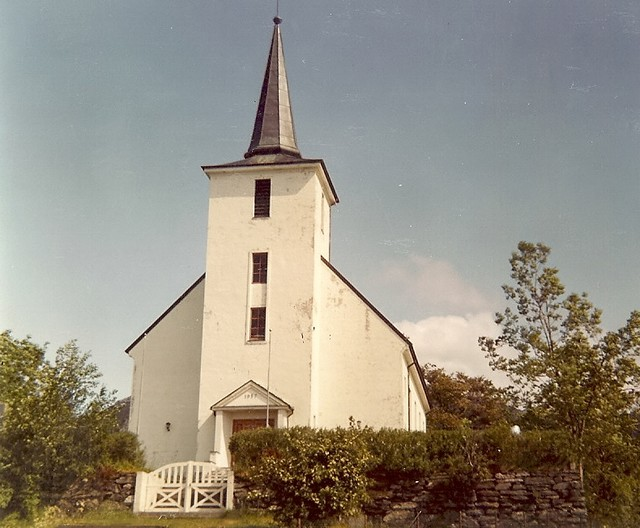
- Stavang Church in Bru

- Sogn og Fjordane within Norway

- Bru within Sogn og Fjordane
- Coordinates: 61°32′05″N 05°10′56″E
- Country: Norway
- County: Sogn og Fjordane
- District: Sunnfjord
- Established: 1 Jan 1923
  - Preceded by: Kinn Municipality
- Disestablished: 1 Jan 1964
  - Succeeded by: Flora Municipality
- Administrative centre: Stavang

Government
  - Mayor (1956–1964): Anton Holm

Area (upon dissolution)
  - Total: 352.3 km^{2} (136.0 sq mi)
  - Rank: #251 in Norway
- Highest elevation: 1,362 m (4,469 ft)

Population (1963)
  - Total: 1,235
  - Rank: #578 in Norway
  - Density: 3.5/km^{2} (9.1/sq mi)
  - Change (10 years): ▼ −12.3%

Official language
  - Norwegian form: Nynorsk
- Time zone: UTC+01:00 (CET)
  - Summer (DST): UTC+02:00 (CEST)
- ISO 3166 code: NO-1436

Bru is a former municipality in the old Sogn og Fjordane county, Norway. The 352.3-square-kilometre (136.0 sq mi) municipality existed from 1923 until its dissolution in 1964. The area is now part of Kinn Municipality in the traditional district of Sunnfjord in Vestland county. The administrative centre was the village of Stavang.

Prior to its dissolution in 1964, the 352.3-square-kilometre (136.0 sq mi) municipality was the 251st largest by area out of the 689 municipalities in Norway. Bru Municipality was the 578th most populous municipality in Norway with a population of about 1,235. The municipality's population density was 3.5 inhabitants per square kilometre (9.1/sq mi) and its population had decreased by 12.3% over the previous 10-year period.

== General information ==
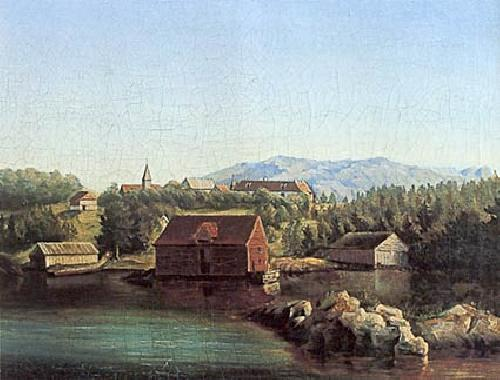
View of Svanøy in the 1850s

The parish of Bru was established as a municipality on 1 January 1923, when the old Kinn Municipality was split into three separate municipalities as follows:

- the new Bru Municipality (population: 1,560), which included the southern islands of Svanøya and Askrova, a small mainland area south of the Førdefjorden, the area around the village of Stavang, and the large valley east of the village of Norddalsfjord
- the new Eikefjord Municipality (population: 929), which included the eastern district around the eastern end of the Eikefjorden and around the village of Eikefjord
- a much smaller Kinn Municipality (population: 2,508), which included the western islands and the mainland areas surrounding, but not including, the port town of Florø

During the 1960s, there were many municipal mergers across Norway due to the work of the Schei Committee. On 1 January 1964, Bru Municipality ceased to exist and its lands were divided as follows:

- All of Bru Municipality located north of the Førdefjorden (population: 1,155) was merged with the town of Florø (population: 2,040), Kinn Municipality (population: 3,567), Eikefjord Municipality (population: 919), the Husefest and Breivik areas of Bremanger Municipality (population: 9), and the Steindal area of Vevring Municipality (population: 25) were combined to form the new Flora Municipality.
- All of Bru Municipality located south of the Førdefjorden (population: 92) was merged with Askvoll Municipality (population: 3,086) and the parts of Vevring Municipality located south of the Førdefjorden (population: 407) to form a new, larger Askvoll Municipality.

=== Name ===
The municipality (originally the parish) is named after the island Brulandet, now called Svanøya, (Old Norse: Brúa) since the first Bru Church was built on the island (the church site was mved off the island to the mainland village of Stavang in 1872). The old name of the island is identical to the plural genitive case of the word brú which means "bridge".

=== Churches ===
The Church of Norway had one parish (sokn) within Bru Municipality. At the time of the municipal dissolution, it was part of the Kinn prestegjeld and the Sunnfjord prosti (deanery) in the Diocese of Bjørgvin.

Churches in Bru Municipality
Parish (sokn)	Church name	Location of the church	Year built
Bru	Stavang Church	Stavang	1957
Bru	Askrova Chapel	Askrova	1957
Bru	Nordal Chapel	Norddalsfjord	1898

== Geography ==
The municipality included several islands including Svanøya, Askrova, and Stavøya as well as parts of the mainland including the Solheimsdalen valley, east of the village of Norddalsfjord. The highest point in the municipality was the 1,362-metre (4,469 ft) tall mountain Keipen, on the border with Bremanger Municipality. Davik Municipality was located to the north, Gloppen Municipality and Eikefjord Municipality were located to the east, Vevring Municipality and Fjaler Municipality were located to the south, and Askvoll Municipality was located to the southwest, and Kinn Municipality and Florø Municipality were to the west.

== Government ==
While it existed, Bru Municipality was responsible for primary education (through 10th grade), outpatient health services, senior citizen services, welfare and other social services, zoning, economic development, and municipal roads and utilities. The municipality was governed by a municipal council of directly elected representatives. The mayor was indirectly elected by a vote of the municipal council. The municipality was under the jurisdiction of the Gulating Court of Appeal.

=== Municipal council ===
The municipal council (Heradsstyre) of Bru Municipality was made up of 17 representatives that were elected to four year terms. The tables below show the historical composition of the council by political party.

Bru heradsstyre 1959–1963
Party name (in Nynorsk)	Number of representatives
Labour Party (Arbeidarpartiet)	5
Liberal Party (Venstre)	6
Joint List(s) of Non-Socialist Parties (Borgarlege Felleslister)	4
Local List(s) (Lokale lister)	2
Total number of members:	17
Note: On 1 January 1964, Bru Municipality became part of Flora Municipality.

Bru heradsstyre 1955–1959
Party name (in Nynorsk)	Number of representatives
Labour Party (Arbeidarpartiet)	6
Joint List(s) of Non-Socialist Parties (Borgarlege Felleslister)	7
Local List(s) (Lokale lister)	4
Total number of members:	17

Bru heradsstyre 1951–1955
Party name (in Nynorsk)	Number of representatives
Labour Party (Arbeidarpartiet)	5
Farmers' Party (Bondepartiet)	1
Liberal Party (Venstre)	3
Joint List(s) of Non-Socialist Parties (Borgarlege Felleslister)	2
Local List(s) (Lokale lister)	5
Total number of members:	16

Bru heradsstyre 1947–1951
Party name (in Nynorsk)	Number of representatives
Labour Party (Arbeidarpartiet)	8
Liberal Party (Venstre)	3
Joint List(s) of Non-Socialist Parties (Borgarlege Felleslister)	5
Total number of members:	16

Bru heradsstyre 1945–1947
Party name (in Nynorsk)	Number of representatives
Labour Party (Arbeidarpartiet)	7
Local List(s) (Lokale lister)	9
Total number of members:	16

Bru heradsstyre 1937–1941*
Party name (in Nynorsk)	Number of representatives
Labour Party (Arbeidarpartiet)	6
Liberal Party (Venstre)	5
Joint List(s) of Non-Socialist Parties (Borgarlege Felleslister)	5
Total number of members:	16
Note: Due to the German occupation of Norway during World War II, no elections were held for new municipal councils until after the war ended in 1945.

=== Mayors ===
The mayor (Nynorsk: ordførar) of Bru Municipality was the political leader of the municipality and the chairperson of the municipal council. The following people have held this position:

- 1923–1925: Bjarne Svanøe
- 1925–1926: Nikolai Haave
- 1926–1937: Per Hjertenes
- 1938–1940: Per Straumsnes
- 1945–1945: Per Straumsnes
- 1946–1947: Per Hjertenes
- 1948–1955: Tor Grønnevik
- 1956–1964: Anton Holm

== See also ==
- List of former municipalities of Norway
