= Kinn Municipality (1838–1964) =

Former municipality in Sogn og Fjordane, Norway

Kinn Municipality Kinn herad
- Former municipality
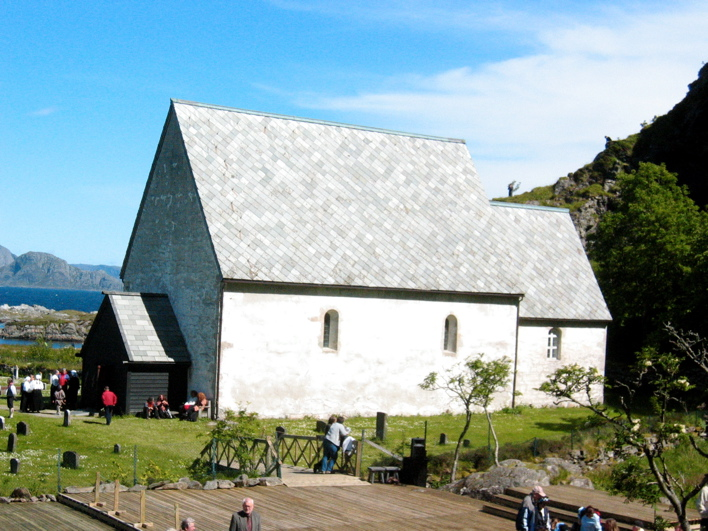
- View of the local Kinn Church

- Sogn og Fjordane within Norway

- Kinn within Sogn og Fjordane
- Coordinates: 61°33′59″N 04°45′25″E
- Country: Norway
- County: Sogn og Fjordane
- District: Sunnfjord
- Established: 1 Jan 1838
  - Created as: Formannskapsdistrikt
- Disestablished: 1 Jan 1964
  - Succeeded by: Flora Municipality
- Administrative centre: Kinn

Government
  - Mayor (1960–1964): Olav Færøyvik (Ap)

Area (upon dissolution)
  - Total: 166.5 km^{2} (64.3 sq mi)
  - Rank: #417 in Norway
- Highest elevation: 1,065 m (3,494 ft)

Population (1963)
  - Total: 3,525
  - Rank: #254 in Norway
  - Density: 21.2/km^{2} (55/sq mi)
  - Change (10 years): ▲ +21.5%

Official language
  - Norwegian form: Nynorsk
- Time zone: UTC+01:00 (CET)
  - Summer (DST): UTC+02:00 (CEST)
- ISO 3166 code: NO-1437

Kinn is a former municipality in the old Sogn og Fjordane county, Norway. The 166.5-square-kilometre (64.3 sq mi) municipality existed from 1838 until its dissolution in 1964. The area is now part of a new, larger Kinn Municipality (same name, different borders) in the traditional district of Sunnfjord in Vestland county. The administrative centre was the island of Kinn where the main Kinn Church is located. Other villages in the municipality included Rognaldsvåg and Batalden.

Prior to its dissolution in 1964, the 166.5-square-kilometre (64.3 sq mi) municipality was the 417th largest by area out of the 689 municipalities in Norway. Kinn Municipality was the 254th most populous municipality in Norway with a population of about 3,525. The municipality's population density was 21.2 inhabitants per square kilometre (55/sq mi) and its population had increased by 21.5% over the previous 10-year period.

== General information ==
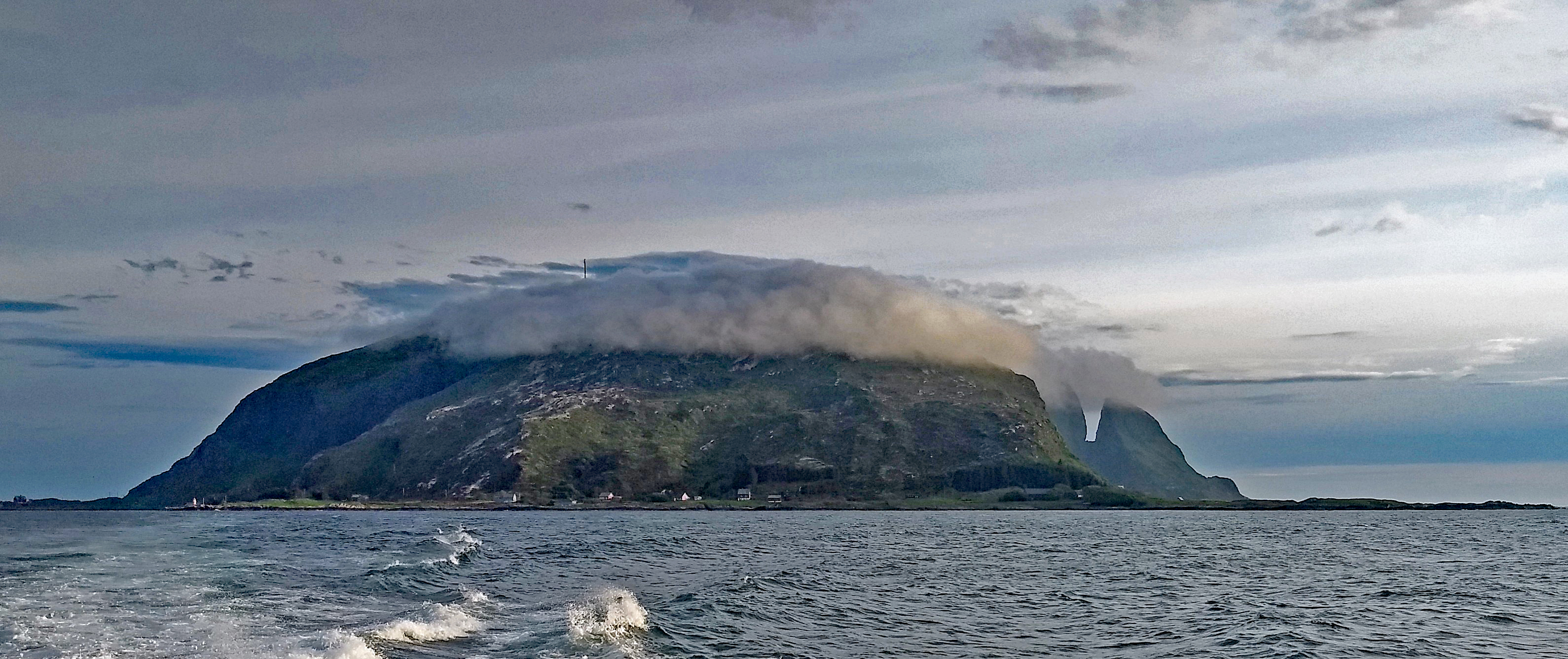
View of the island of Kinn

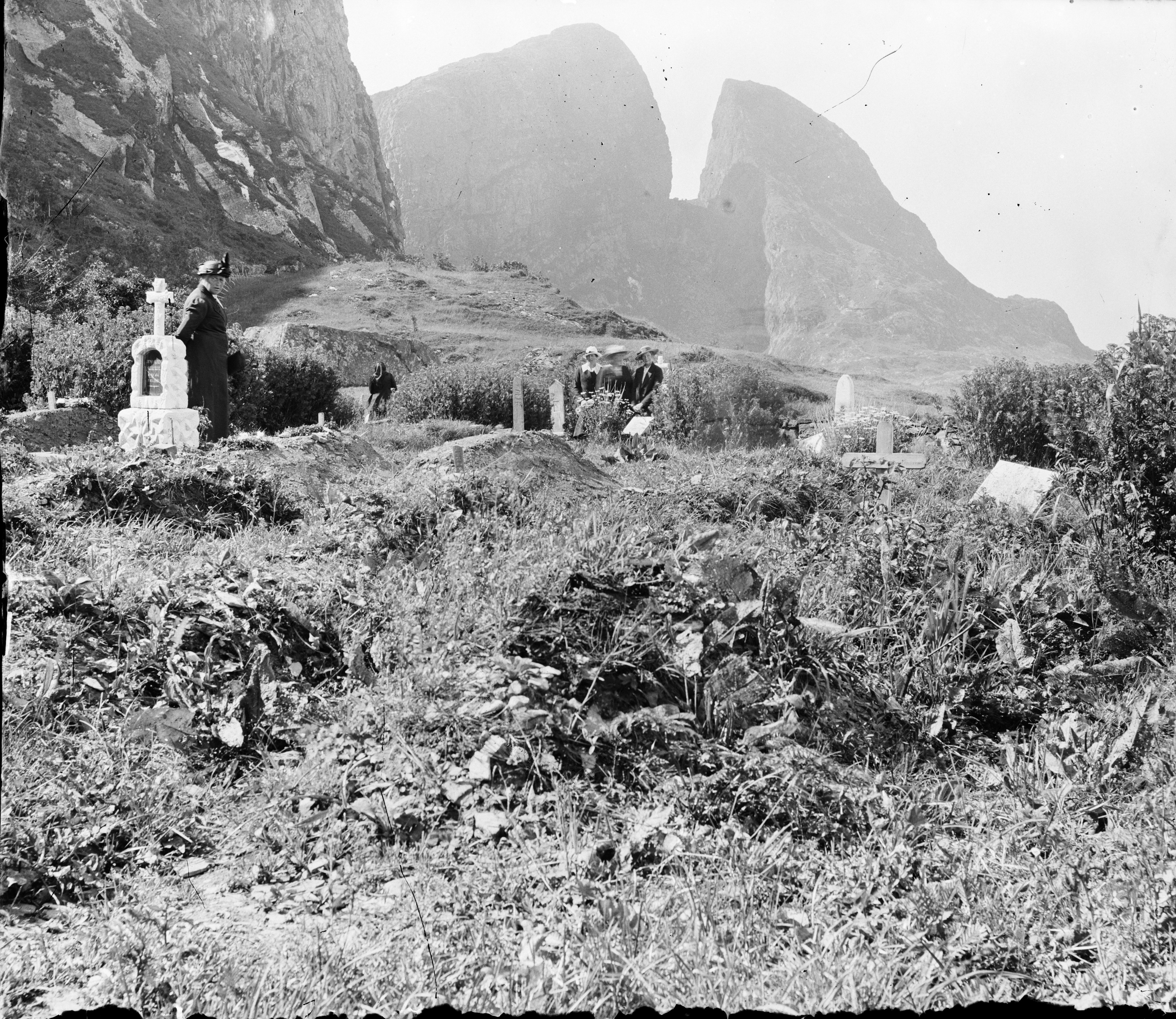
Churchyard at Kinn

The prestegjeld of Kinn existed for centuries. On 1 January 1838, the prestegjeld of Kinn was established as a municipality (see formannskapsdistrikt law). On 3 January 1861, the village of Florø (population: 846) was established as a ladested (port town) and it was therefore separated from Kinn to become Florø Municipality. This left 6,531 residents in Kinn. Then on 1 January 1866, Kinn Municipality was divided as follows:

- the islands of Bremangerlandet and Frøya and the mainland area surrounding the Gulen Fjord (population: 1,852) was separated from Kinn to form the new Bremanger Municipality
- the rest of Kinn Municipality (population: 4,679) remained as a smaller Kinn Municipality

On 1 January 1923, Kinn Municipality was split into three separate municipalities as follows:

- Kinn Municipality (population: 2,508), which included the western islands and the mainland areas surrounding, but not including, the port town of Florø
- Bru Municipality (population: 1,560), which included the southern islands of Svanøya and Askrova, a small mainland area south of the Førdefjorden, the area around the village of Stavang, and the large valley east of the village of Norddalsfjord
- Eikefjord Municipality (population: 929), which included the eastern district around the eastern end of the Eikefjorden and around the village of Eikefjord

During the 1960s, there were many municipal mergers across Norway due to the work of the Schei Committee. On 1 January 1964, the new Flora Municipality was created by merging the following areas (and essentially re-creating the original Kinn Municipality from 1838):

- the ladested of Florø (population: 2,040)
- all of Kinn Municipality (population: 3,567)
- all of Eikefjord Municipality (population: 919)
- the parts of Bru Municipality that were located north of the Førdefjorden (population: 1,155)
- the villages of Husefest and Breivik in Bremanger Municipality (population: 9)
- the Steindal valley area in Vevring Municipality (population: 25)

On 1 January 2020, the old Kinn name was brought back into use when Flora Municipality and Vågsøy Municipality merged, creating a new Kinn Municipality.

=== Name ===
The municipality (originally the parish) is named after the old Kinn farm (Old Norse: Kinn) on the island of Kinn since the first Kinn Church was built there. The name is identical to the word kinn which means "cheek", referring to the steep slope of a mountain on the island. Historically, the island's name was spelled Kind.

=== Churches ===
The Church of Norway had one parish (sokn) within Kinn Municipality. At the time of the municipal dissolution, it was part of the Kinn prestegjeld and the Sunnfjord prosti (deanery) in the Diocese of Bjørgvin.

Churches in Kinn Municipality
Parish (sokn)	Church name	Location of the church	Year built
Kinn	Kinn Church	Kinn	12th century
Kinn	Batalden Chapel	Fanøya	1907
Note: Florø Church was also part of this parish, however, that was located in the neighboring Florø Municipality

== Geography ==
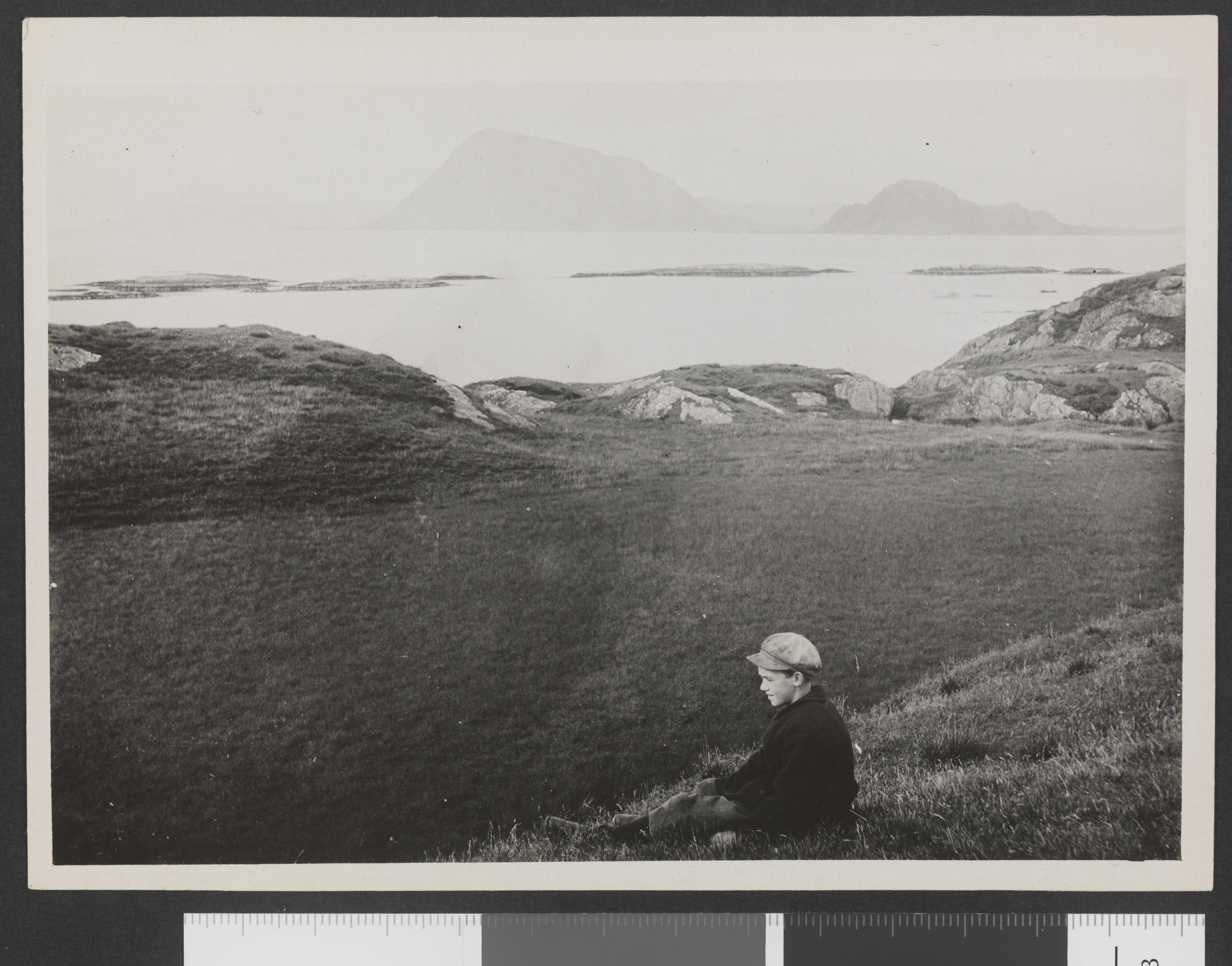
View of Kinn (c. 1921)

The municipality encompassed most of the southern part of the present-day Kinn Municipality (same name, different borders) as well as parts of Askvoll Municipality (in the south) and the southwestern part of Bremanger Municipality (in the north). The highest point in the municipality was the 1,065-metre (3,494 ft) tall mountain Haukåbøra, located along the border with Bremanger Municipality.

Bremanger Municipality was located to the north, Bru Municipality was located to the east, Askvoll Municipality was located to the south, and the North Sea was located to the west.

== Government ==
While it existed, Kinn Municipality was responsible for primary education (through 10th grade), outpatient health services, senior citizen services, welfare and other social services, zoning, economic development, and municipal roads and utilities. The municipality was governed by a municipal council of directly elected representatives. The mayor was indirectly elected by a vote of the municipal council. The municipality was under the jurisdiction of the Gulating Court of Appeal.

=== Municipal council ===
The municipal council (Heradsstyre) of Kinn Municipality was made up of 21 representatives that were elected to four year terms. The tables below show the historical composition of the council by political party.

Kinn heradsstyre 1959–1963
Party name (in Nynorsk)	Number of representatives
Labour Party (Arbeidarpartiet)	9
Christian Democratic Party (Kristeleg Folkeparti)	2
Liberal Party (Venstre)	7
Joint List(s) of Non-Socialist Parties (Borgarlege Felleslister)	3
Total number of members:	21
Note: On 1 January 1964, Kinn Municipality became part of Flora Municipality.

Kinn heradsstyre 1955–1959
Party name (in Nynorsk)	Number of representatives
Labour Party (Arbeidarpartiet)	9
Conservative Party (Høgre)	2
Christian Democratic Party (Kristeleg Folkeparti)	1
Liberal Party (Venstre)	8
Local List(s) (Lokale lister)	1
Total number of members:	21

Kinn heradsstyre 1951–1955
Party name (in Nynorsk)	Number of representatives
Labour Party (Arbeidarpartiet)	6
Conservative Party (Høgre)	3
Liberal Party (Venstre)	7
Total number of members:	16

Kinn heradsstyre 1947–1951
Party name (in Nynorsk)	Number of representatives
Conservative Party (Høgre)	3
Liberal Party (Venstre)	7
List of workers, fishermen, and small farmholders (Arbeidarar, fiskarar, småbrukarar liste)	6
Total number of members:	16

Kinn heradsstyre 1945–1947
Party name (in Nynorsk)	Number of representatives
Labour Party (Arbeidarpartiet)	6
Conservative Party (Høgre)	4
Local List(s) (Lokale lister)	6
Total number of members:	16

Kinn heradsstyre 1937–1941*
Party name (in Nynorsk)	Number of representatives
Labour Party (Arbeidarpartiet)	5
Liberal Party (Venstre)	5
Joint List(s) of Non-Socialist Parties (Borgarlege Felleslister)	6
Total number of members:	16
Note: Due to the German occupation of Norway during World War II, no elections were held for new municipal councils until after the war ended in 1945.

=== Mayors ===
The mayor (Nynorsk: ordførar) of Kinn Municipality was the political leader of the municipality and the chairperson of the municipal council. The following people have held this position:

- 1838–1839: Elias Skorpeide
- 1840–1841: L. Tyvold
- 1842–1845: Rev. Hans Hartvig Irgens
- 1846–1853: Christopher Svanøe
- 1854–1854: Rev. Hans Hartvig Irgens
- 1855–1857: H. Lexau
- 1858–1863: Rev. Hans Jensen Blom
- 1864–1865: H.M. Dahl
- 1866–1867: Ludvig Nøstdahl
- 1868–1869: Christopher Svanøe
- 1870–1901: Ludvig Nøstdahl
- 1902–1907: A. Hødal
- 1908–1911: T. Osen
- 1912–1918: A. Svarthumle
- 1919–1919: M. N. Seim
- 1920–1922: Bjarne Svanøe
- 1923–1926: Ivar Lykke Falch Lind (H)
- 1927–1927: A. Hammerseth
- 1928–1928: Ivar Lykke Falch Lind (H)
- 1929–1931: K. Nybø
- 1932–1934: M. N. Seim
- 1935–1937: Alf Melvær
- 1938–1939: M. Eide
- 1940–1941: Anders Tansøy
- 1942–1942: Karl Sunde
- 1943–1944: A. Hovland
- 1945–1945: Anders Tansøy
- 1946–1947: Einar Seim
- 1948–1960: Odd Færøyvik (V)
- 1960–1964: Olav Færøyvik (Ap)

== Notable people ==
- Hans Jensen Blom, the vicar of Kinn Church and member of the Parliament of Norway
- Mathias Sigwardt Greve, a physician who briefly worked in Kinn
- Ivar Lykke Falch Lind, the former mayor and bailiff of Kinn
- Michael Sars, the vicar of Kinn Church from 1831 to 1838
- Georg Ossian Sars, a marine biologist who discovered that cod fish eggs are pelagic

== See also ==
- List of former municipalities of Norway
