= Florø =

Town in Vestland, Norway

- Town/City
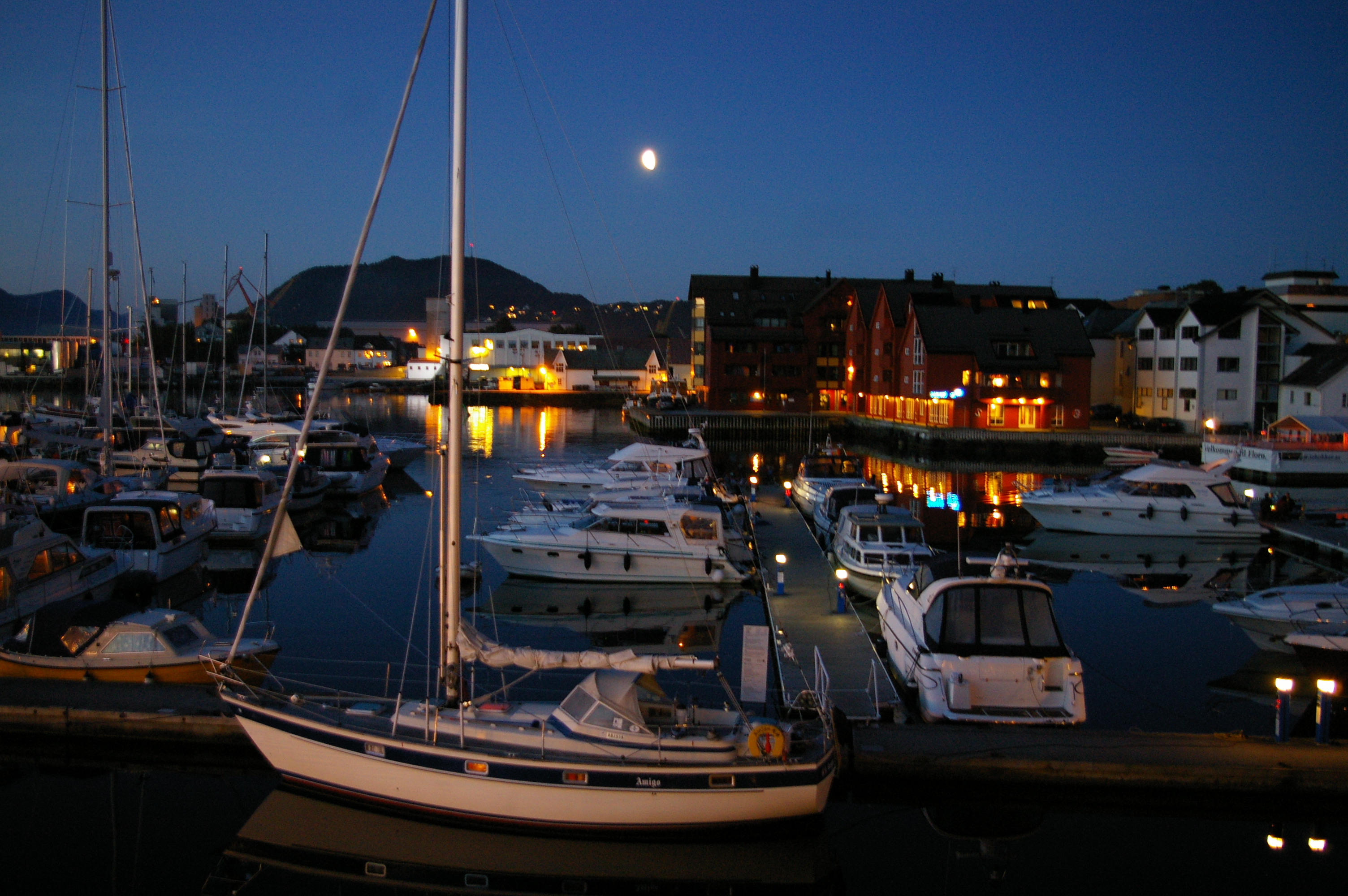
- View of the town
- Interactive map of Florø
- Coordinates: 61.5996°N 5.0328°E
- Country: Norway
- Region: Western Norway
- County: Vestland
- District: Sunnfjord
- Municipality: Kinn Municipality
- Established as
- Ladested: 1860
- Town Districts: List: Badevika; Botnaholten; Botnavegen; Brandsøy; Evja; Havreneset; Hesteneset; Kleiva; Krokane; Solheim; Tua

Area
  - Total: 6.55 km^{2} (2.53 sq mi)
- Elevation: 7 m (23 ft)

Population (2024)
  - Total: 9,071
  - Density: 1,383/km^{2} (3,580/sq mi)
- Demonym: Florøværing
- Time zone: UTC+01:00 (CET)
  - Summer (DST): UTC+02:00 (CEST)
- Post Code: 6900 Florø
- Former municipality
- Florø ladested
- Coat of arms

- Sogn og Fjordane within Norway

- Florø within Sogn og Fjordane
- Country: Norway
- County: Sogn og Fjordane
- District: Sunnfjord
- Established: 3 Jan 1861
  - Preceded by: Kinn Municipality
- Disestablished: 1 Jan 1964
  - Succeeded by: Flora Municipality
- Administrative centre: Florø

Government
  - Mayor (1962–1964): Kjeld Haus

Area
  - Total: 0.72 km^{2} (0.28 sq mi)
  - Rank: #678 in Norway

Population (1963)
  - Total: 2,017
  - Rank: #433 in Norway
  - Density: 2,801.4/km^{2} (7,256/sq mi)
  - Change (10 years): ▲ +4.3%

Official language
  - Norwegian form: Neutral
- Time zone: UTC+01:00 (CET)
  - Summer (DST): UTC+02:00 (CEST)
- ISO 3166 code: NO-1401

Florø (Norwegian pronunciation: [fluːrøː]) is a town and the administrative centre of Kinn Municipality in Vestland county, Norway. The town was founded by royal decree in 1860 as a ladested on the island of Florelandet, located between the Botnafjorden and Solheimsfjorden. Florø is Norway's (and thus the Scandinavian Peninsula's) westernmost town. It is the most western town on the mainland in the Nordic countries.

The 6.55-square-kilometre (1,620-acre) town has a population (2024) of 9,071 and a population density of 1,385 inhabitants per square kilometre (3,590/sq mi).

The town encompasses the entire island of Florelandet and the western half of the island of Brandsøya. The Norwegian national road Rv 5 is the main road connecting Florø to the rest of Norway. The nearby villages of Brandsøy and Grov lie several kilometers to the east of Florø. The islands of Reksta, Kinn, Skorpa lie several kilometers to the west of the town. Florø is also home to Florø Airport and Florø Church.

Florø is also a former municipality that existed as an independent town-municipality for just over 100 years (1860-1964) before being merged into Flora Municipality. On 1 January 2020, the town (and Flora Municipality) became part of the new Kinn Municipality after another municipal merger.

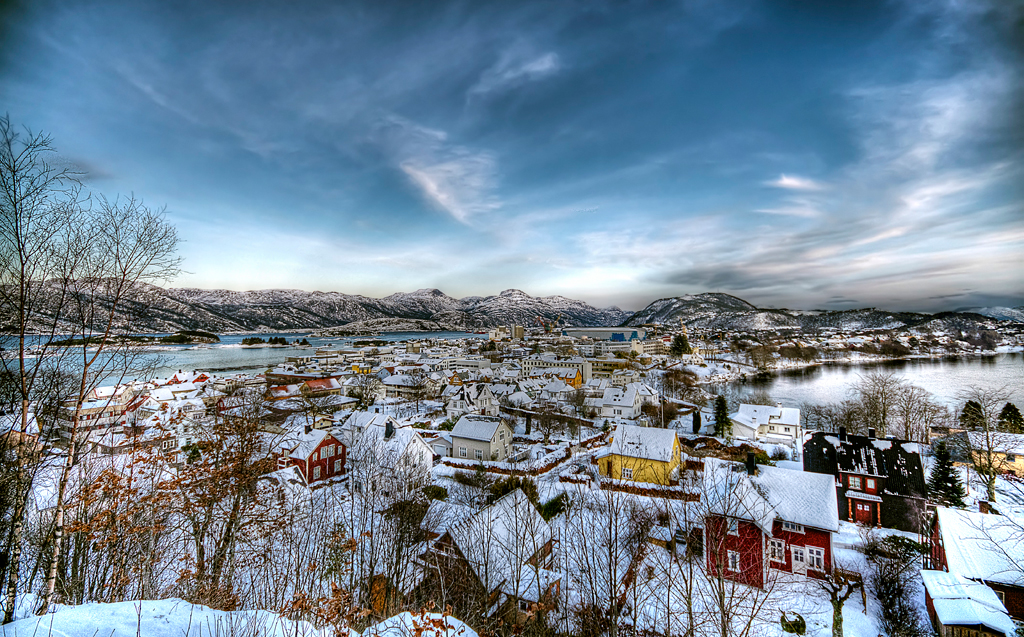
View of the town

== Name ==
The town (and municipality) was named after the old Flora farm (Old Norse: Flóra), near where the town of Florø was built in 1860. The meaning of the name is somewhat uncertain with a couple of different likely possibilities. The old name, is the accusative case/genitive case of the word flórr which means "floor", from which the names Flora and Florelandet are derived. This Old Norse word is probably derived from a Germanic root word, flōraz, meaning "flat ground". Another possibility for the meaning of the name is that it is derived from the word flóð which means "flood" or "deluge". A common misunderstanding is that the name Florø includes the Danish word ø which means "island" as a suffix that was attached to the farm name Flora. Although not true, it nearly led to the town being renamed Florøy in the 1930s.

== Economy ==
The basis for the foundation of the town was the rich herring fisheries, symbolised by the three herrings in the town's coat of arms. Fishing is still an important part of the economy, in addition to shipbuilding and service industries. After the discovery of petroleum in the North Sea in the 1960s, Florø has been used as a supply base for the petroleum industry.

== History ==
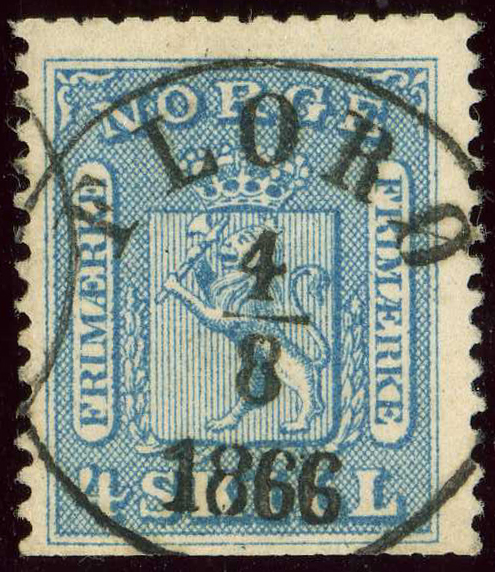
The Florø post office cancel in 1866

Florø was founded as a town (ladested) in 1860. Shortly after its founding, on 3 January 1861, it was removed from the old Kinn Municipality and it became a municipality of its own with a population of 846.

During the 1960s, there were many municipal mergers across Norway due to the work of the Schei Committee. On 1 January 1964, a large municipal merger took place, merging the following places to form the newly-created Flora Municipality.

- the whole town-municipality of Florø (population: 2,040)
- all of Eikefjord Municipality (population: 919)
- all of Kinn Municipality (population: 3,567)
- the parts of Bru Municipality located north of the Førdefjorden (population: 1,155)
- the Husefest and Breivik areas of Bremanger Municipality (population: 9)
- the Steindal area of Vevring Municipality (population: 25)

On 1 January 2020, Flora was one of the municipalities that merged into a newly re-created Kinn Municipality, much larger than the old Kinn Municipality that existed from 1838 until 1964.

=== Coat of arms ===
The coat of arms for the town of Florø was granted on 19 February 1960 and they were in use until 1 January 1964, when the new Flora Municipality was created and it included the town of Florø. (On 6 October 1967, the old arms of Florø were granted as the arms for Flora Municipality. These arms were in use until 1 January 2020 when the municipality of Flora was dissolved.) The official blazon is "Gules, three herrings bendwise argent" (Norwegian: På raud botn tre sølv sildar i skrå-stilling). This means the arms have a red field (background) and the charge is a set of three diagonal herring. The charge has a tincture of argent which means it is commonly colored white, but if it is made out of metal, then silver is used. The three herrings are a symbol for the great local importance of herring fishing for the development and economy of Flora. The arms were designed by Hallvard Trætteberg. The municipal flag had the same design as the coat of arms.

=== Self-government (1861-1964) ===
While it existed, Florø Municipality was responsible for primary education (through 10th grade), outpatient health services, senior citizen services, welfare and other social services, zoning, economic development, and municipal roads and utilities. The municipality was governed by a municipal council of directly elected representatives. The mayor was indirectly elected by a vote of the municipal council. The municipality was under the jurisdiction of the Gulating Court of Appeal.

==== Mayors ====
The mayor (Norwegian: ordfører) of Florø Municipality was the political leader of the municipality and the chairperson of the municipal council. The following people have held this position:

- 1865–1873: Ude Jacob Høst
- 1874–1881: Livius Smitt
- 1882–1885: Gunnar Olsen
- 1886–1886: Oscar von Koss
- 1887–1887: Fredrik Faye
- 1888–1890: Fredrik T. Lorentzen
- 1891–1897: Gunnar Olsen
- 1897–1901: E.M. Hole
- 1902–1904: Elias Olsen
- 1905–1907: Abraham Haave
- 1908–1908: Ole Johannes Vasbotten
- 1909–1910: Elias Olsen
- 1911–1922: E.M. Hole
- 1923–1927: Abraham Haave
- 1928–1933: Alfred V. Lauvsnes
- 1934–1934: Andreas Hodnefjeld
- 1935–1939: Alfred V. Lauvsnes
- 1940–1940: Einar Stavang
- 1945–1945: S.I. Solheim
- 1945–1946: Einar Stavang
- 1949–1955: Olav Kolle
- 1955–1957: Ludvig Olai Botnen (V)
- 1958–1959: Kjeld Haus
- 1960–1961: Ludvig Olai Botnen (V)
- 1962–1964: Kjeld Haus

==== Municipal council ====
The municipal council (Bystyre) of Florø Municipality was made up of 21 representatives that were elected to four year terms. The tables below show the historical composition of the council by political party.

Florø bystyre 1959–1963
| Party name (in Nynorsk) | Number of representatives |
|---|---|
| Labour Party (Arbeidarpartiet) | 9 |
| Conservative Party (Høgre) | 5 |
| Liberal Party (Venstre) | 6 |
| Local List(s) (Lokale lister) | 1 |
| Total number of members: | 21 |

Florø bystyre 1955–1959
| Party name (in Nynorsk) | Number of representatives |
|---|---|
| Labour Party (Arbeidarpartiet) | 10 |
| Conservative Party (Høgre) | 6 |
| Liberal Party (Venstre) | 5 |
| Total number of members: | 21 |

Florø bystyre 1951–1955
| Party name (in Nynorsk) | Number of representatives |
|---|---|
| Labour Party (Arbeidarpartiet) | 10 |
| Conservative Party (Høgre) | 4 |
| Liberal Party (Venstre) | 6 |
| Total number of members: | 20 |

Florø bystyre 1947–1951
| Party name (in Nynorsk) | Number of representatives |
|---|---|
| Labour Party (Arbeidarpartiet) | 11 |
| Conservative Party (Høgre) | 5 |
| Liberal Party (Venstre) | 4 |
| Total number of members: | 20 |

Florø bystyre 1945–1947
| Party name (in Nynorsk) | Number of representatives |
|---|---|
| Labour Party (Arbeidarpartiet) | 7 |
| Conservative Party (Høgre) | 6 |
| Communist Party (Kommunistiske Parti) | 2 |
| Liberal Party (Venstre) | 5 |
| Total number of members: | 20 |

Florø bystyre 1937–1941*
| Party name (in Nynorsk) | Number of representatives |
|---|---|
| Labour Party (Arbeidarpartiet) | 9 |
| Conservative Party (Høgre) | 3 |
| Liberal Party (Venstre) | 4 |
| Joint List(s) of Non-Socialist Parties (Borgarlege Felleslister) | 4 |
| Total number of members: | 20 |
Note: Due to the German occupation of Norway during World War II, no elections were held for new municipal councils until after the war ended in 1945.

Florø bystyre 1935–1937
| Party name (in Norwegian) | Number of representatives |
|---|---|
| Labour Party (Arbeiderpartiet) | 9 |
| Conservative Party (Høyre) | 6 |
| Liberal Party (Venstre) | 4 |
| Local List(s) (Lokale lister) | 1 |
| Total number of members: | 20 |

== Climate ==
Florø has a temperate oceanic climate (Köppen: Cfb). Its climate is strongly moderated by the Norwegian Sea, resulting in mild winters, a large seasonal temperature lag and relatively cool summers. Florø is more windy than the neighboring town of Førde, but receives less precipitation as a result of its coastal location. The wind in Flørø usually comes from the east, as a result of pressure-driven channeling by the Eikefjord. During afternoons in the summer the sea breeze results in a cool wind from the north, while strong depressions give strong winds from the south-west with strong gusts.

Climate data for Florø Lufthamn 1991–2020 (9 m, Precipitation from Ytterøyane Lighthouse)
| Month | Jan | Feb | Mar | Apr | May | Jun | Jul | Aug | Sep | Oct | Nov | Dec | Year |
|---|---|---|---|---|---|---|---|---|---|---|---|---|---|
| Daily mean °C (°F) | 3.2 (37.8) | 2.6 (36.7) | 3.5 (38.3) | 6.1 (43.0) | 9.0 (48.2) | 12.0 (53.6) | 14.8 (58.6) | 14.7 (58.5) | 12.2 (54.0) | 8.4 (47.1) | 5.9 (42.6) | 3.6 (38.5) | 8.0 (46.4) |
| Average precipitation mm (inches) | 129.1 (5.08) | 122.7 (4.83) | 103.2 (4.06) | 66.3 (2.61) | 61.3 (2.41) | 64.7 (2.55) | 83.9 (3.30) | 102.2 (4.02) | 124.8 (4.91) | 117.4 (4.62) | 143.6 (5.65) | 134.2 (5.28) | 1,253.4 (49.32) |
Source: NOAA-WMO averages 91-2020 Norway

== Notable people ==
- Georg Ossian Sars (1837–1927), marine and freshwater biologist

== See also ==
- List of towns and cities in Norway
- List of former municipalities of Norway
