= Eikefjord Church =

Church in Vestland, Norway

- Eikefjord kyrkje
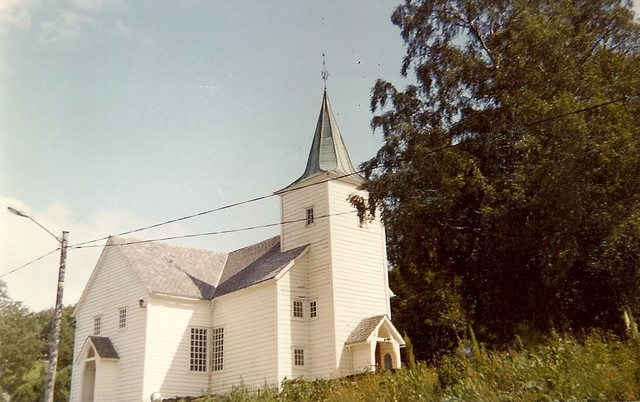
- View of the church
- Eikefjord Church
- 61°35′07″N 5°27′34″E
- Location: Kinn Municipality, Vestland
- Country: Norway
- Denomination: Church of Norway
- Churchmanship: Evangelical Lutheran

History
- Status: Parish church
- Founded: 1812
- Consecrated: 1812

Architecture
- Functional status: Active
- Architectural type: Cruciform
- Completed: 1812 (214 years ago)

Specifications
- Capacity: 350
- Materials: Wood

Administration
- Diocese: Bjørgvin bispedømme
- Deanery: Sunnfjord prosti
- Parish: Eikefjord
- Norwegian Cultural Heritage Site
- Type: Church
- Status: Automatically protected
- ID: 84076

Eikefjord Church (Norwegian: Eikefjord kyrkje) is a parish church of the Church of Norway in Kinn Municipality in Vestland county, Norway. It is located in the village of Eikefjord. It is the church for the Eikefjord parish which is part of the Sunnfjord prosti (deanery) in the Diocese of Bjørgvin. The white, wooden church was built in 1812 using plans drawn up by an unknown architect. Originally, it was built in a long church design, but in 1874, the church was enlarged into a cruciform design. The church seats about 350 people.

== History ==
Around 1810, the villagers of Eikefjord joined forces to get a church built in their community. Søren Agledal as the driving force among the residents. The first church in Eikefjord was built in 1812. It was a small long church with about 150-200 seats. The lead builder was Nils Olsen Kjørslevik. Originally, the church was privately owned, but it was sold to the parish in 1874 for 1000 Norwegian rigsdaler. Soon after the sale, the church was enlarged by adding a transept to the north and south sides of the nave to create a cruciform design. Each of the three cross-arms of the nave also had a 2nd floor seating gallery. The remodeling was led by the builder John J. Alver. In 1890, the Eikefjord area was separated from the rest of the Svanøy parish and it was established as its own parish. In 1936, a two-room sacristy was added to the east side of the church. In 1953, electric heating was installed in the church. During the 1970s, the church was modernized again. Running water, bathroom facilities, and electric lighting was all installed.

== See also ==
- List of churches in Bjørgvin
