= Eikefjord (village) =

Village in Kinn Municipality, Norway

- Village
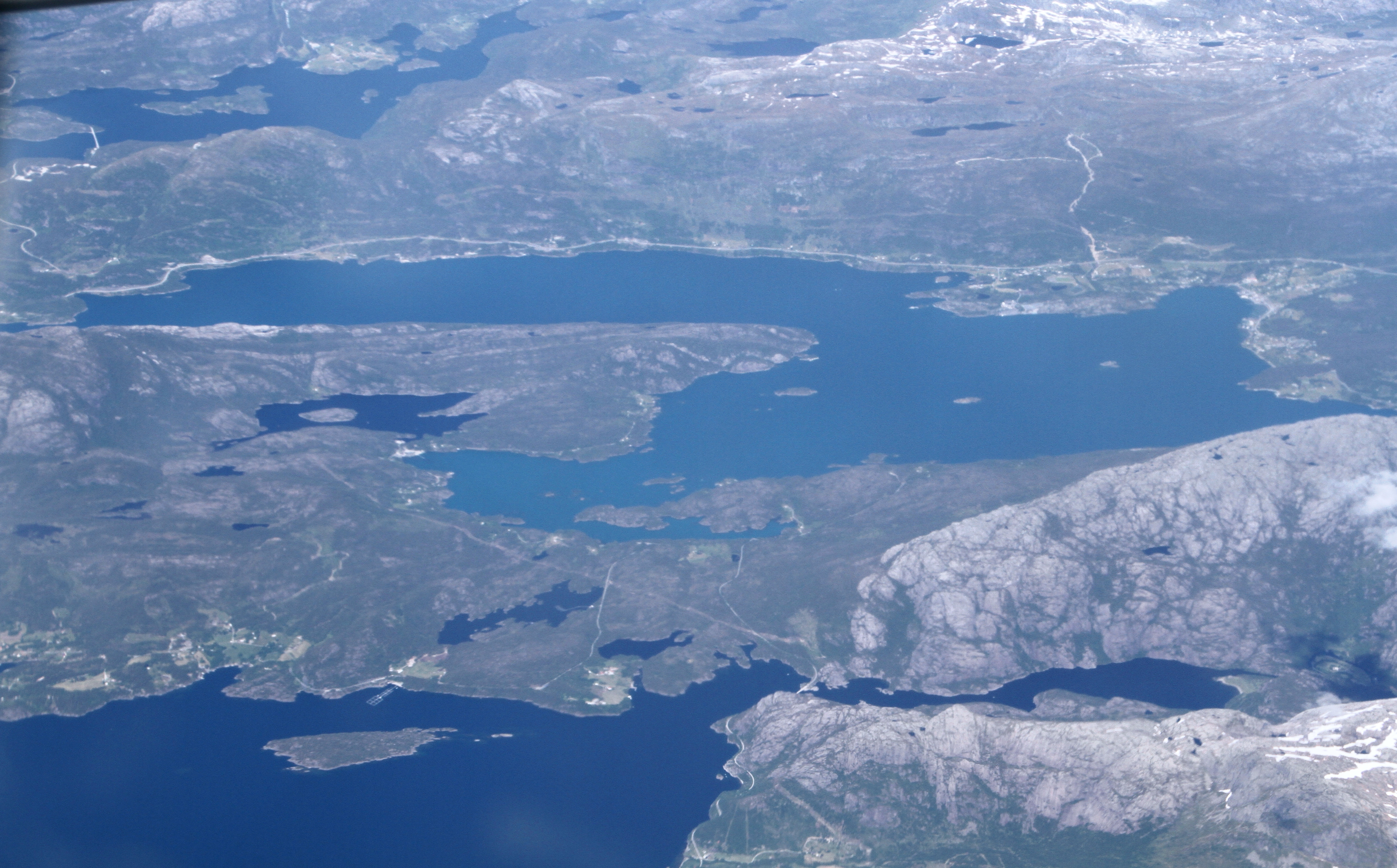
- View of the village (right side of photo, along the shore)
- Interactive map of Eikefjord
- Location within Vestland Location within Norway
- Coordinates: 61.58803°N 5.46224°E
- Country: Norway
- Region: Western Norway
- County: Vestland
- District: Sunnfjord
- Municipality: Kinn Municipality

Area
  - Total: 0.39 km^{2} (0.15 sq mi)
- Elevation: 3 m (9.8 ft)

Population (2024)
  - Total: 435
  - Density: 1,115/km^{2} (2,890/sq mi)
- Time zone: UTC+01:00 (CET)
  - Summer (DST): UTC+02:00 (CEST)
- Post Code: 6940 Eikefjord

Eikefjord is a village in Kinn Municipality in Vestland county, Norway. The village is located at the end of the Eikefjorden along the Norwegian National Road 5 highway. The town of Florø lies about 30 kilometres (19 mi) to the west and the village of Naustdal lies about 20 kilometres (12 mi) to the southeast (through the Naustdal Tunnel. The lake Endestadvatnet lies about 5 kilometres (3.1 mi) to the east. The villages of Nyttingnes and Steinhovden lie about 15 kilometres (9.3 mi) west of Eikefjord.

The 0.39-square-kilometre (96-acre) village has a population (2024) of 435 and a population density of 1,115 inhabitants per square kilometre (2,890/sq mi).

Eikefjord Church is located in this village, serving the southeastern part of the municipality. This village was the administrative centre of the old Eikefjord Municipality which existed from 1923 until 1964.

== Name ==
The village was named after the old Eikefjord farm (Old Norse: Eikifjǫrðr) since the Eikefjord Church was located there. The farm is named after the Eikefjorden which is located nearby. The fjord name comes from the Old Norse word eik which means oak wood.

== Population ==
In 2001, the village of Eikefjord had 322 inhabitants. The greater Eikefjord area had exactly 1,000 inhabitants, with 322 inhabitants in the village of Eikefjord, 100 in Tonheim/Grov, 88 in Sunnarvik, 192 in Hovland, 55 in Svardal/Steindalen, 117 in Langedal/Ramsdal, and 126 in Endestad/Løkkebø. Also in 2001, the whole Eikefjord district has a population of 1,273.
