= Endestadvatnet =

Lake in Vestland, Norway

- Interactive map of the lake
- Location: Kinn Municipality,Vestland
- Coordinates: 61.6016°N 5.5717°E
- Primary inflows: Lykkjebøvatnet lake
- Primary outflows: Storelva river
- Basin countries: Norway
- Max. length: 5 kilometres (3.1 mi)
- Max. width: 1.5 kilometres (0.93 mi)
- Surface area: 3.49 km^{2} (1.35 sq mi)
- Shore length^{1}: 13.64 kilometres (8.48 mi)
- Surface elevation: 59 metres (194 ft)
- References: NVE
- ^{1} Shore length is not a well-defined measure.

Endestadvatnet is a lake in Kinn Municipality in Vestland county, Norway. The lake is located about 8 kilometres (5.0 mi) east of the village of Eikefjord and 5 kilometres (3.1 mi) west of the lake Emhjellevatnet in the neighboring Gloppen Municipality.

== See also ==
- List of lakes in Norway
