= Kinn Municipality =

Municipality in Vestland, Norway

Kinn Municipality Kinn kommune
- Municipality
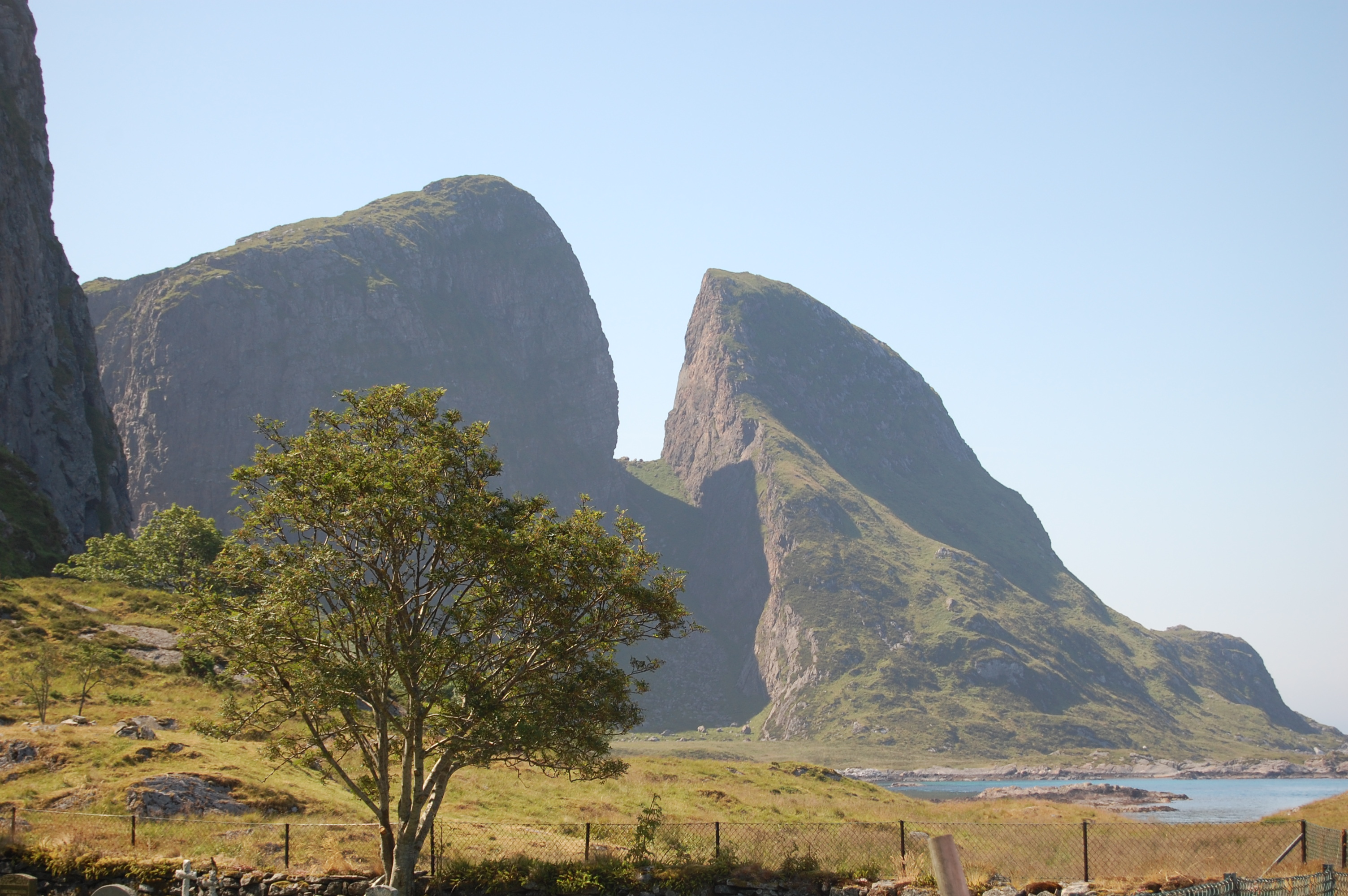
- View of the Kinnaklova mountain

- Coat of arms

- Vestland within Norway

- Kinn within Vestland
- Coordinates: 61.5996°N 5.0328°E
- Country: Norway
- County: Vestland
- District: Nordfjord and Sunnfjord
- Established: 1 Jan 2020
  - Preceded by: Flora Municipality and Vågsøy Municipality
- Administrative centre: Florø and Måløy

Government
  - Mayor (2023): Bengt Solheim-Olsen (H)

Area
  - Total: 811.86 km^{2} (313.46 sq mi)
  - Land: 763.03 km^{2} (294.61 sq mi)
  - Water: 48.83 km^{2} (18.85 sq mi) 6%
  - Rank: #142 in Norway
- Highest elevation: 1,362.08 m (4,468.8 ft)

Population (2025)
  - Total: 17,419
  - Rank: #75 in Norway
  - Density: 21.5/km^{2} (56/sq mi)
  - Change (10 years): ▼ −2.9%
- Demonym: Kinnhering

Official language
  - Norwegian form: Nynorsk
- Time zone: UTC+01:00 (CET)
  - Summer (DST): UTC+02:00 (CEST)
- ISO 3166 code: NO-4602
- Website: Official website

Kinn is a municipality in Vestland county, Norway. It was established on 1 January 2020 in the traditional districts of Nordfjord and Sunnfjord. The municipality is the only non-contiguous municipality in Norway since Bremanger Municipality lies in between the north and south parts of Kinn. The administrative centre of the municipality is the two towns of Florø and Måløy. Some villages in the municipality include Rognaldsvåg, Stavang, Grov, Norddalsfjord, Nyttingnes, Steinhovden, Brandsøy, Deknepollen, Holvika, Husevåg, Kvalheim, Langeneset, Raudeberg, Refvika, Silda, Tennebø, Vedvika, and Vågsvåg.

Historically, there was another Kinn Municipality in Norway that existed from 1838 until 1964. The "old" Kinn Municipality roughly corresponded to the southern part of the "new" Kinn Municipality.

The 812-square-kilometre (314 sq mi) municipality is the 142nd largest by area out of the 357 municipalities in Norway. Kinn Municipality is the 75th most populous municipality in Norway with a population of 17,419. The municipality's population density is 21.5 inhabitants per square kilometre (56/sq mi) and its population has decreased by 2.9% over the previous 10-year period.

The 2021 film Dune was partially filmed in Kinn Municipality, serving as House Atreides’ home world of Caladan.

== General information ==
The municipality was established on 1 January 2020 when the old Flora Municipality was merged with most of Vågsøy Municipality (the rest of Vågsøy Municipality was merged into the new Stad Municipality).

=== Name ===
The municipality was created in 2020 and it resurrected the name of the old Kinn Municipality which existed from 1838 to 1964. That municipality (originally the parish) was named after the old Kinn farm (Old Norse: Kinn) on the island of Kinn since the first Kinn Church was built there. The name is identical to the word kinn which means "cheek", referring to the steep slope of a mountain on the island. Historically, the island's name was spelled Kind.

=== Coat of arms ===
The coat of arms was granted in 2019 for use starting on 1 January 2020 when the municipality was established. The informal blazon is "Per chevron ployé divided per pale azure and argent above and azure below with four bendlets sinister argent enarched on the sinister half". This means the arms have a field (background) has a tincture of azure in parts and elsewhere it is argent which means it is commonly colored white, but if it is made out of metal, then silver is used. The arms are an abstract design and the four "bendlets" give the illusion of the bow of a boat, an important symbol for the fishing community. The design can also be seen as a rock, waves, or the head of a spear.

=== Churches ===
The Church of Norway has many churches in Kinn Municipality which is part of the Diocese of Bjørgvin. There are four parishes (sokn) in the Sunnfjord prosti (deanery) and one parish (sokn) in the Nordfjord prosti (deanery).

Churches in Kinn Municipality
Deanery (prosti)	Parish (sokn)	Church name	Location of the church	Year built
Nordfjord prosti	Vågsøy	Nord-Vågsøy Church	Raudeberg	1960
Nordfjord prosti	Vågsøy	Sør-Vågsøy Church	Måløy	1907
Sunnfjord prosti	Bru	Askrova Chapel	Askrova	1957
Sunnfjord prosti	Bru	Stavang Church	Stavang	1957
Sunnfjord prosti	Eikefjord	Eikefjord Church	Eikefjord	1812
Sunnfjord prosti	Kinn	Batalden Chapel	Fanøya	1907
Sunnfjord prosti	Kinn	Florø Church	Florø	1882
Sunnfjord prosti	Kinn	Kinn Church	Kinn	12th century
Sunnfjord prosti	Nordal	Nordal Church	Norddalsfjord	1898

== Government ==
Kinn Municipality is responsible for primary education (through 10th grade), outpatient health services, senior citizen services, welfare and other social services, zoning, economic development, and municipal roads and utilities. The municipality is governed by a municipal council of directly elected representatives. The mayor is indirectly elected by a vote of the municipal council. The municipality is under the jurisdiction of the Sogn og Fjordane District Court and the Gulating Court of Appeal.

=== Municipal council ===
The municipal council (Kommunestyre) of Kinn Municipality is made up of 39 representatives that are elected to four-year terms. The tables below show the current and historical composition of the council by political party.

Kinn kommunestyre 2023–2027
Party name (in Nynorsk)	Number of representatives
Labour Party (Arbeidarpartiet)	8
Progress Party (Framstegspartiet)	5
Conservative Party (Høgre)	10
Industry and Business Party (Industri‑ og Næringspartiet)	2
Christian Democratic Party (Kristeleg Folkeparti)	2
Red Party (Raudt)	4
Centre Party (Senterpartiet)	3
Socialist Left Party (Sosialistisk Venstreparti)	2
Liberal Party (Venstre)	3
Total number of members:	39

Kinn kommunestyre 2020–2023
Party name (in Nynorsk)	Number of representatives
Labour Party (Arbeidarpartiet)	10
Progress Party (Framstegspartiet)	2
Green Party (Miljøpartiet Dei Grøne)	2
Conservative Party (Høgre)	6
Christian Democratic Party (Kristeleg Folkeparti)	1
Red Party (Raudt)	4
Centre Party (Senterpartiet)	8
Socialist Left Party (Sosialistisk Venstreparti)	2
Liberal Party (Venstre)	4
Total number of members:	39

=== Mayors ===
The mayor (Nynorsk: ordførar) of Kinn Municipality is the political leader of the municipality and the chairperson of the municipal council. Here is a list of people who have held this position:

- 2020–2023: Ola Teigen (Ap)
- 2023–present: Bengt Solheim-Olsen (H)

== Geography ==
Kinn Municipality is a unique non-contiguous municipality, the only of its kind in Norway. It is separated into two parts, with Bremanger Municipality in the middle. The northern portion of Kinn Municipality includes the island of Vågsøy and a small portion of the mainland east of the island on northern and outer shore of the Nordfjorden. Other populated islands in this part of the municipality include Silda, Måløyna, and Husevågøy. The lake Deknepollvatnet is located between the villages of Deknepollen and Tennebø. Stad Municipality is located to the north and east, Bremanger Municipality is located to the south, and the North Sea is located to the west.

The southern portion of Kinn Municipality is located on the coast at the entrances to the Norddalsfjorden and Førdefjorden. It includes many islands, including Reksta, Askrova, Svanøya, Skorpa, Fanøya, Hovden, and Kinn. The municipality also includes the large lakes of Endestadvatnet, Lykkjebøvatnet, and Vassetevatnet. The Norddalsfjorden is crossed by the Norddalsfjord Bridge. The waterfall Brudesløret is located in the municipality. The highest point in the municipality is the 1,362.08-metre (4,468.8 ft) tall mountain Keipen, located on the border with Bremanger Municipality. Bremanger Municipality is located to the north, Gloppen Municipality was located to the east, Sunnfjord Municipality is located to the southeast, and Askvoll Municipality is located to the southwest. The North Sea is located to the west.

== Climate ==
Ytterøyane Lighthouse in Kinn has been recording temperature since 1984, showing a temperate oceanic climate (marine west coast, Köppen: Cfb). The all-time high 30 °C (86 °F) was recorded July 2019, and the all-time low −8.7 °C (16.3 °F) was recorded February 2001. On 7 November 2018 Ytterøyane recorded 19.4 °C (66.9 °F)) which was new record high for Vestland. In 2015 there were no freezing lows at all.

Since the lighthouse is located far out into the open sea, the winters there are warmer and summers are colder than what is found in the rest of the municipality. The mountains (above ca. 800 m) have a tundra climate (ET), while the inland valleys in the southern part of the municipality have a humid continental climate (Dfb).

The northern part of the municipality is known for its strong winds. Kråkenes fyr has the record for the strongest wind ever measured in Norway, with an average wind speed of 48.9 m/s and gust of 61.7 m/s.

Climate data for Ytterøyane Lighthouse 1991–2020 (26 m, extremes 1984–2024)
Month	Jan	Feb	Mar	Apr	May	Jun	Jul	Aug	Sep	Oct	Nov	Dec	Year
Record high °C (°F)	10.6 (51.1)	10.6 (51.1)	11.5 (52.7)	19.5 (67.1)	24.6 (76.3)	28 (82)	30 (86)	26.9 (80.4)	22 (72)	20.7 (69.3)	19.4 (66.9)	13 (55)	30 (86)
Mean daily maximum °C (°F)	5.4 (41.7)	4.7 (40.5)	5.4 (41.7)	7.7 (45.9)	10.3 (50.5)	12.7 (54.9)	15.4 (59.7)	16.4 (61.5)	14.2 (57.6)	11 (52)	8.2 (46.8)	6.2 (43.2)	9.8 (49.7)
Daily mean °C (°F)	4.2 (39.6)	3.4 (38.1)	3.9 (39.0)	5.9 (42.6)	8.4 (47.1)	11.1 (52.0)	13.6 (56.5)	14.6 (58.3)	12.9 (55.2)	9.6 (49.3)	6.9 (44.4)	4.9 (40.8)	8.3 (46.9)
Mean daily minimum °C (°F)	2.5 (36.5)	1.8 (35.2)	2.4 (36.3)	4.3 (39.7)	6.9 (44.4)	9.6 (49.3)	12.2 (54.0)	13.2 (55.8)	11.3 (52.3)	8 (46)	5.2 (41.4)	3.2 (37.8)	6.7 (44.1)
Record low °C (°F)	−8 (18)	−8.7 (16.3)	−6 (21)	−4.1 (24.6)	0 (32)	4.5 (40.1)	7 (45)	7.5 (45.5)	4 (39)	0 (32)	−5.2 (22.6)	−3.8 (25.2)	−8.7 (16.3)
Average precipitation mm (inches)	129.1 (5.08)	122.7 (4.83)	103.2 (4.06)	66.3 (2.61)	61.3 (2.41)	64.7 (2.55)	83.9 (3.30)	102.2 (4.02)	124.8 (4.91)	117.4 (4.62)	143.6 (5.65)	134.2 (5.28)	1,253.4 (49.32)
Source 1: Norwegian Meteorological Institute/eklima
Source 2: NOAA-WMO averages 91-2020 Norway

Climate data for Florø Lufthamn 1991–2020 (9 m)
Month	Jan	Feb	Mar	Apr	May	Jun	Jul	Aug	Sep	Oct	Nov	Dec	Year
Daily mean °C (°F)	3.2 (37.8)	2.6 (36.7)	3.5 (38.3)	6.1 (43.0)	9.0 (48.2)	12.0 (53.6)	14.8 (58.6)	14.7 (58.5)	12.2 (54.0)	8.4 (47.1)	5.9 (42.6)	3.6 (38.5)	8.0 (46.4)
Source: NOAA-WMO averages 91-2020 Norway

Climate data for Myklebustfjellet 2014–2025 (715 m)
Month	Jan	Feb	Mar	Apr	May	Jun	Jul	Aug	Sep	Oct	Nov	Dec	Year
Daily mean °C (°F)	−2.3 (27.9)	−2.8 (27.0)	−2.0 (28.4)	1.3 (34.3)	2.8 (37.0)	8.1 (46.6)	10.5 (50.9)	10.1 (50.2)	7.4 (45.3)	3.7 (38.7)	0.8 (33.4)	−1.7 (28.9)	3.0 (37.4)
Source: Yr.no

== Notable people ==
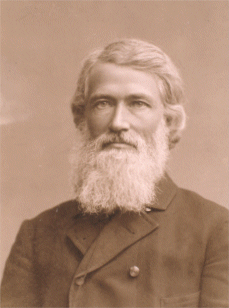
Johan Ernst Sars, 1883

- Ernst Sars (1835 in Kinn – 1917), a professor, historian, author, and editor
- Sigurd Høst (1866 in Flora – 1939), an educationalist, academic, and school textbook writer
- Martha Tynæs (1870 in Florø – 1930), a feminist, social worker, and politician
- Ivar Lykke Falch Lind (1870–1951), a jurist and politician who was Mayor of Kinn Municipality in 1920s
- Thor Solberg (1893 in Florø – 1967), an aviation pioneer who flew from the US to Norway in 1935
- Arnvid Vasbotten (1903 in Florø – 1985), a jurist and politician for Nasjonal Samling
- Jon Tolaas (1939 in Vågsøy −2012), a teacher, poet, and novelist
- Dagfinn Hjertenes (1943 in Florø – 2006), a Norwegian politician who was Mayor of Flora Municipality in the 1980s
- Per Drageset (born 1944 in Raudeberg), a Norwegian civil servant who was Assistant County Governor of Sogn og Fjordane
- Reidar Sandal (born 1949 in Vågsøy), a Norwegian politician
- Øyulf Hjertenes (born 1979 in Florø), an economist, journalist, and newspaper editor

=== Sport ===
- Anne Grethe Jeppesen (born 1957 in Florø), a sport shooter who competed at the 1984 Summer Olympics
- Margunn Haugenes (born 1970 in Florø), a Norwegian Olympic champion footballer
- Runar Hove (born 1995 in Florø), a Norwegian footballer with 160 club caps

== Media gallery ==
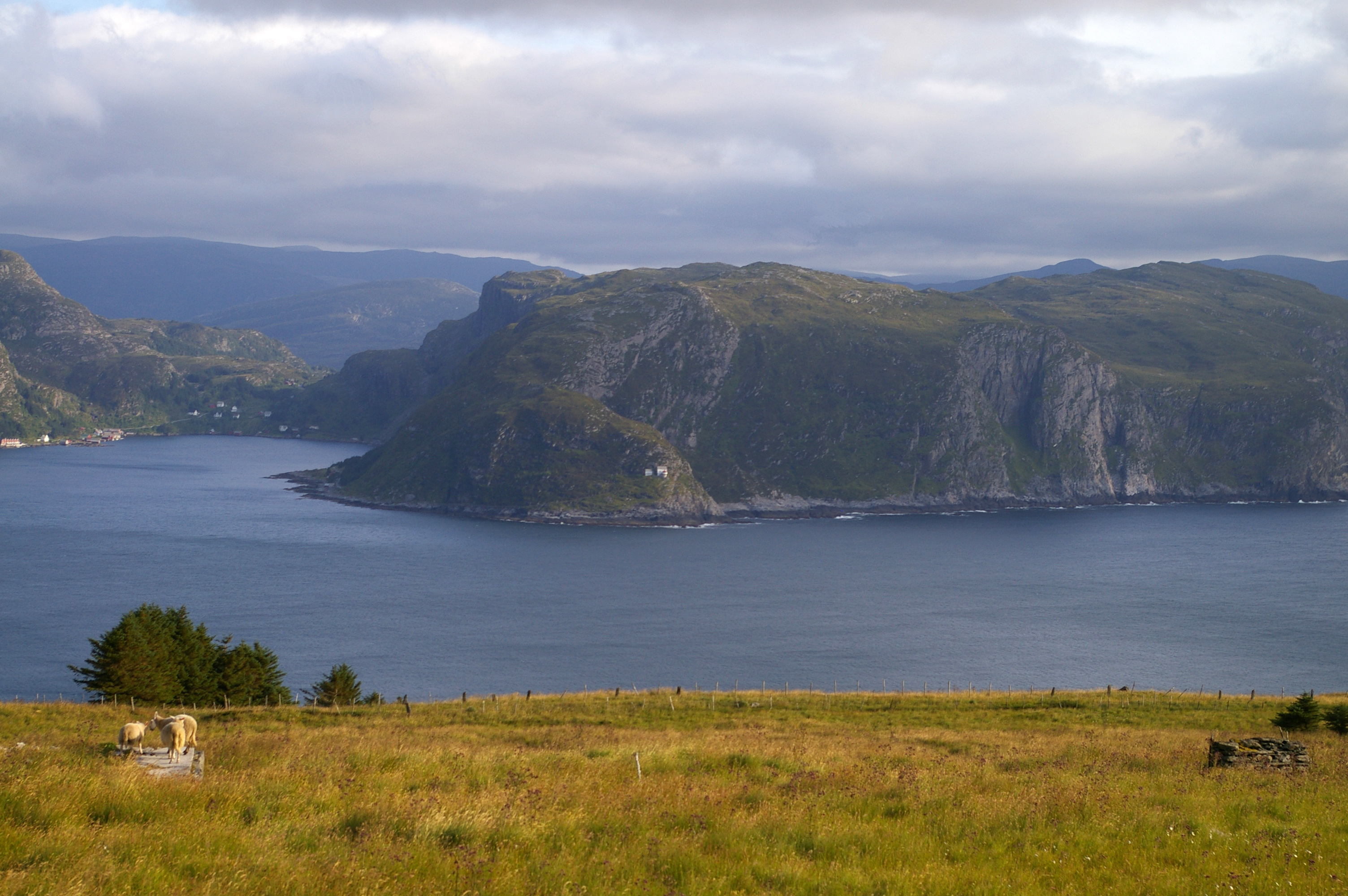
Hendanes

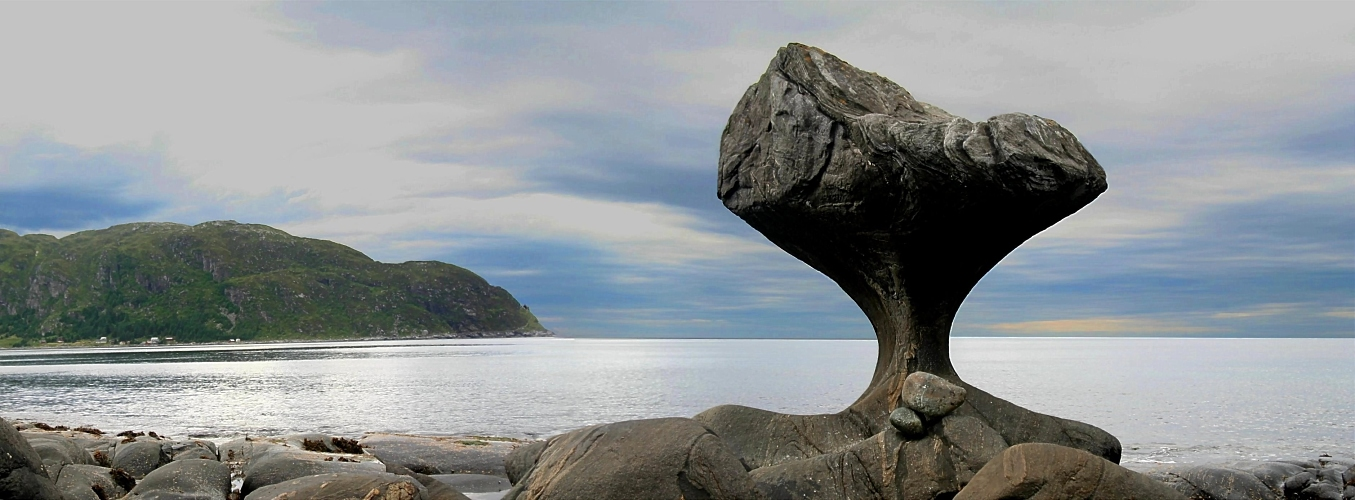
Kannestein

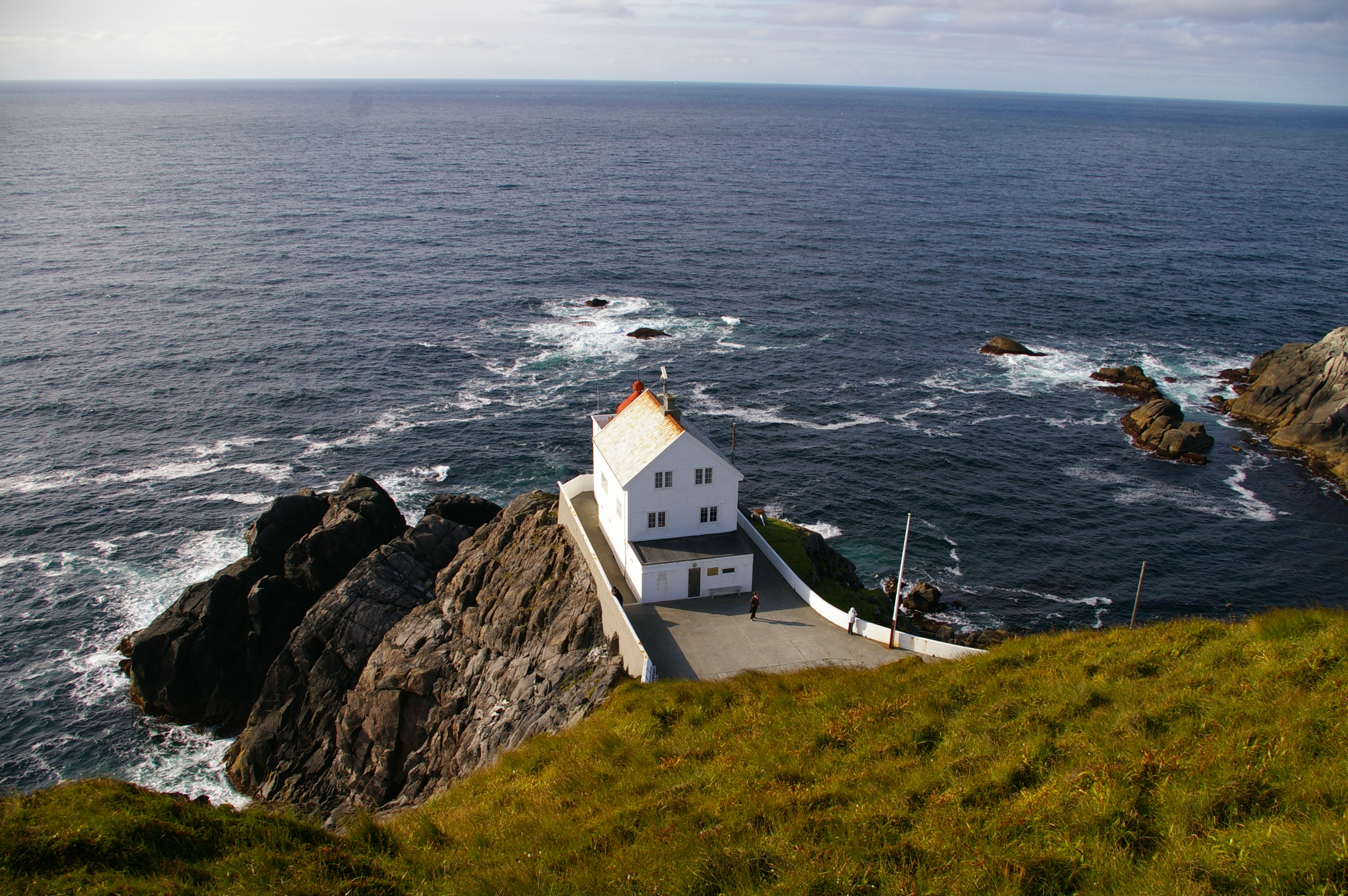
Kråkenes

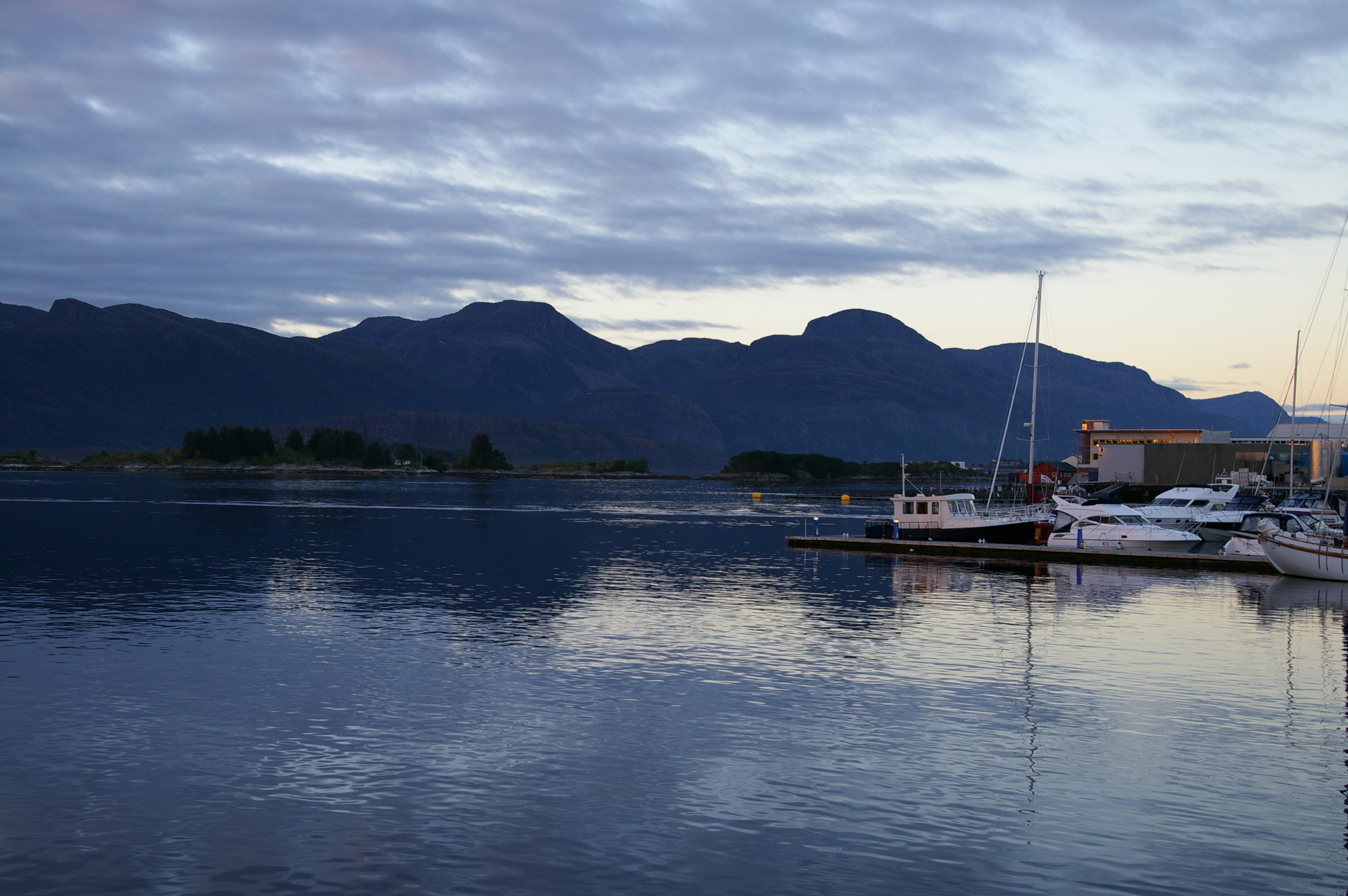
Botnafjorden

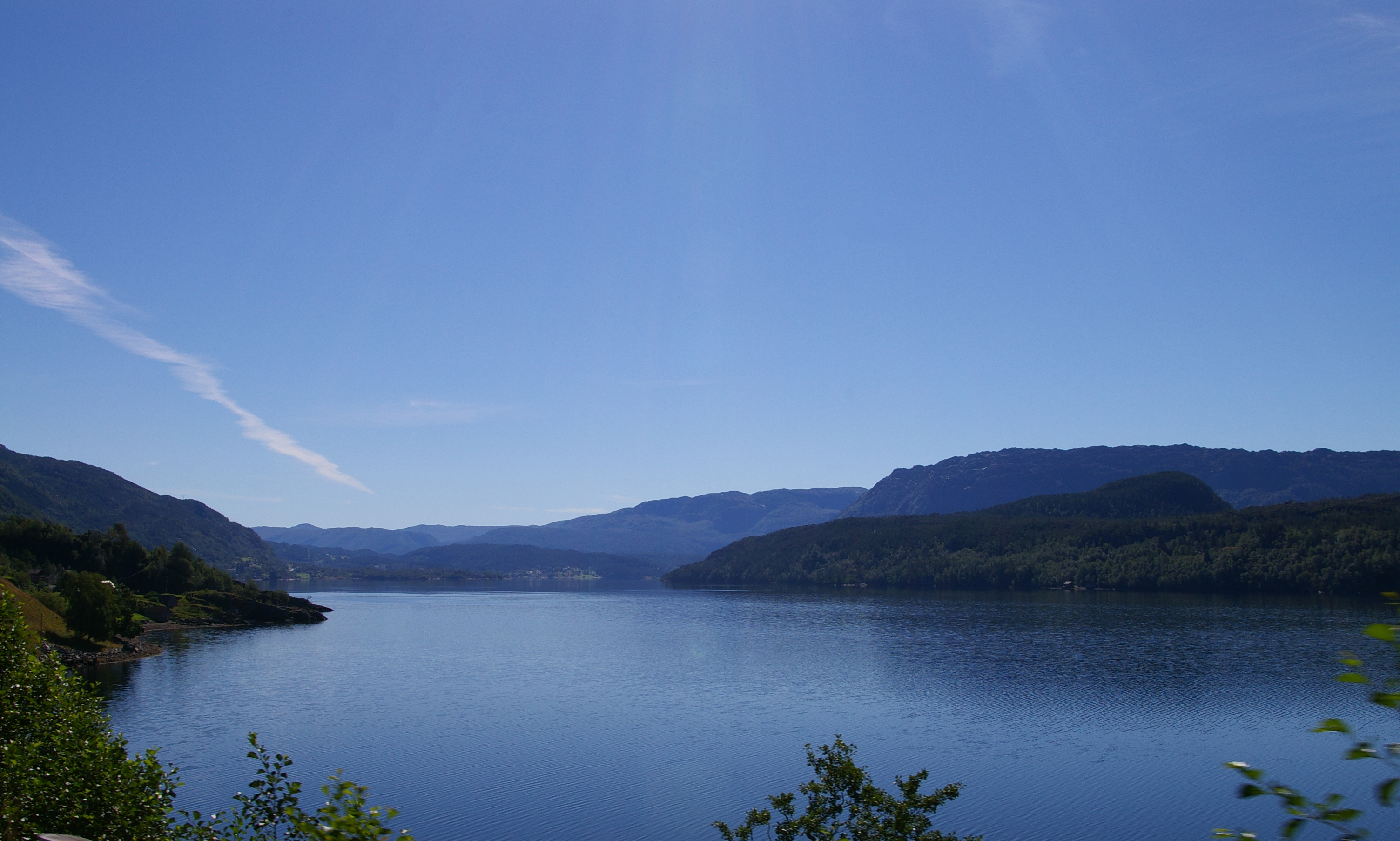
Eikefjorden
