= List of bridges in Norway =

This is a list of bridges and viaducts in Norway, including those for pedestrians and vehicular traffic.

== Historical and architectural interest bridges ==
	Name	Distinction	Length	Type	Carries Crosses	Opened	Location	County	Ref.
1	Terland klopp	Largest of its kind in the Nordics; Cultural heritage	60 m (200 ft)	Clapper bridge 21 spans	Footbridge; Gyaåna	1800	Egersund, Eigersund Municipality; 58°33′54.7″N 6°13′51.9″E	Rogaland	
2	Horndøla Bridge		52 m (171 ft)	Clapper bridge 8 spans	County Road 60; Horndøla	1813	Hornindalen valley, Volda Municipality; 62°01′6.7″N 6°40′53.3″E	Vestland	
3	Lunde Bridge	Span : 21 m (69 ft); Cultural heritage	132 m (433 ft)	Masonry; 1 segmental arch	County Road 251; Etna	1829	Etnedal Municipality; 60°51′56.9″N 9°42′39.4″E	Innlandet	
4	Løkke Bridge	First cast iron bridge in Norway	23 m (75 ft)	Arch; Cast iron deck arch	Footbridge; Sandvikselva	1829	Sandvika, Bærum Municipality; 59°53′34.1″N 10°31′08.2″E	Akershus	
5	Bakke Bridge		53 m (174 ft)	Suspension; Chain bridge, masonry pylons	County Road 946; Sira	1844	Sira, Flekkefjord Municipality; 58°24′48.1″N 6°39′17.1″E	Agder	
6	Old Town Bridge		82 m (269 ft)	Beam bridge Wood	Road bridge Nidelva	1861	Trondheim, Trondheim Municipality; 63°25′41.6″N 10°24′05.9″E	Trøndelag	
7	Jora Bridge	Span : 54 m (177 ft)	85 m (279 ft)	Masonry; 1 segmental main arch	Rauma Line; Jora	1919	Dombås, Dovre Municipality; 62°05′35.0″N 9°06′18.4″E	Innlandet	
8	Stuguflåt Bridge	Span : 30 m (98 ft)	54 m (177 ft)	Masonry; 1 segmental main arch	Rauma Line; Rauma	1922	Lesja Municipality; 62°17′04.4″N 8°08′16.7″E	Innlandet	
9	Storstraumen Bridge	Span : 57 m (187 ft)		Masonry; 1 segmental main arch	Former road bridge Footbridge; Skodjestraumen	1922	Straumen, Ålesund Municipality; 62°30′08.9″N 6°36′59.2″E	Møre og Romsdal	
10	Eggestraumen Bridge	Span : 40 m (130 ft)		Masonry; 1 segmental arch	Former road bridge Footbridge; Eggestraumen	1922	Straumen, Ålesund Municipality; 62°30′05.8″N 6°37′14.4″E	Møre og Romsdal	
11	Kylling Bridge	Span : 42 m (138 ft); Height : 59 m (194 ft)	76 m (249 ft)	Masonry; 1 segmental main arch	Rauma Line; Rauma	1924	Verma, Rauma Municipality; 62°20′16.9″N 8°03′35.2″E	Møre og Romsdal	
12	Storseisundet Bridge	Atlantic Ocean Road	260 m (850 ft)	Box girder Prestressed concrete	County Road 64; Storseisund	1989	Hustadvika Municipality–Averøy Municipality; 63°01′00.6″N 7°21′16.2″E	Møre og Romsdal	
13	Vebjørn Sand Da Vinci Project	Bridge designed by Leonardo da Vinci in 1502	109 m (358 ft)	Arch; Glued laminated timber deck arch	Footbridge; European route E18	2001	Nordby, Ås Municipality; 59°43′08.1″N 10°47′03.5″E	Akershus	
14	Ypsilon			Cable-stayed; Steel deck and pylon	Footbridge; Drammenselva	2008	Drammen, Drammen Municipality; 59°44′39.5″N 10°11′42.7″E	Buskerud	

== Major road and railway bridges ==
This table presents the structures with spans greater than 200 meters (non-exhaustive list).

	Name	Span	Length	Type	Carries Crosses	Opened	Location	County	Ref.
1	Hardanger Bridge	1,310 m (4,300 ft)	1,373 m (4,505 ft)	Suspension; Steel box girder deck, concrete pylons	National Road 7 National Road 13; Hardangerfjord	2013	Bruravik–Brimnes; 60°28′43.5″N 6°49′49.8″E	Vestland	
2	Hålogaland Bridge	1,145 m (3,757 ft)	1,533 m (5,030 ft)	Suspension; Steel box girder deck, concrete pylons	European route E6; Rombaken	2016	Narvik; 68°27′33.0″N 17°28′55.6″E	Nordland	
3	Askøy Bridge	850 m (2,790 ft)	1,057 m (3,468 ft)	Suspension; Steel box girder deck, concrete pylons	County Road 562; Byfjorden	1992	Bergen–Askøy; 60°23′43.5″N 5°12′54.5″E	Vestland	
4	Stord Bridge	677 m (2,221 ft)	1,077 m (3,533 ft)	Suspension; Steel box girder deck, concrete pylons	European route E39; Digernessundet	2000	Stord–Føyno, Stord Municipality; 59°44′52.7″N 5°24′10.9″E	Vestland	
5	Gjemnessund Bridge	623 m (2,044 ft)	1,257 m (4,124 ft)	Suspension; Steel box girder deck, concrete pylons	European route E39; Gjemnessundet	1992	Bergsøya, Gjemnes Municipality; 62°58′16.2″N 7°46′46.5″E	Møre og Romsdal	
6	Osterøy Bridge	595 m (1,952 ft)	917 m (3,009 ft)	Suspension; Steel box girder deck, concrete pylons	County Road 566; Sørfjorden	1997	Osterøy, Osterøy Municipality; 60°25′33.7″N 5°32′11.3″E	Vestland	
7	Bømla Bridge	577 m (1,893 ft)	998 m (3,274 ft)	Suspension; Steel box girder deck, concrete pylons	County Road 542; Spissøysundet	2000	Nautøy–Spissøy; 59°44′13.2″N 5°22′39.1″E	Vestland	
8	Skarnsund Bridge	530 m (1,740 ft)	1,010 m (3,310 ft)	Cable-stayed; Steel box girder deck, concrete pylons	County Road 755; Skarnsund	1991	Inderøy Municipality; 63°50′36.0″N 11°04′35.0″E	Trøndelag	
9	Skjomen Bridge	525 m (1,722 ft)	711 m (2,333 ft)	Suspension; Steel truss deck, concrete pylons	European route E6; Skjomen	1972	Narvik Municipality; 68°22′15.3″N 17°14′28.6″E	Nordland	
10	Kvalsund Bridge	525 m (1,722 ft)	741 m (2,431 ft)	Suspension; Steel truss deck, concrete pylons	National Road 94; Kvalsundet	1977	Hammerfest Municipality; 70°30′45.1″N 23°57′03.9″E	Finnmark	
11	Dalsfjord Bridge	523 m (1,716 ft)	619 m (2,031 ft)	Suspension; Steel box girder deck, concrete pylons	County Road 609; Dalsfjorden	2013	Fjaler–Askvoll; 61°22′26.4″N 5°23′47.0″E	Vestland	
12	Sotra Bridge	468 m (1,535 ft)	1,236 m (4,055 ft)	Suspension; Steel truss deck, concrete pylons	National Road 555; Knarreviksundet	1971	Bergen–Litlesotra; 60°22′21.2″N 5°09′57.1″E	Vestland	
13	Lysefjord Bridge	446 m (1,463 ft)	640 m (2,100 ft)	Suspension; Steel box girder deck, concrete pylons	County Road 13; Lysefjord	1997	Sandnes Municipality; 58°55′25.5″N 6°05′53.8″E	Rogaland	
14	Helgeland Bridge	425 m (1,394 ft)	1,065 m (3,494 ft)	Cable-stayed; Concrete deck, concrete pylons 177+425+177	County Road 17; Leirfjorden	1991	Sandnessjøen–Leirfjord; 66°02′16.9″N 12°43′11.9″E	Nordland	
15	Varodd Bridge (1956) dismantled in 2020	337 m (1,106 ft)	618 m (2,028 ft)	Suspension; Steel truss deck, concrete pylons	European route E18; Topdalsfjorden	1956	Kristiansand Municipality; 58°09′39.5″N 8°03′23.3″E	Agder	
16	Fedafjorden Bridge	331 m (1,086 ft)	566 m (1,857 ft)	Suspension; Steel box girder deck, concrete pylons	European route E39; County Road 465; Fedafjorden	2006	Kvinesdal Municipality; 58°15′39.7″N 6°50′43.9″E	Agder	
17	Rombak Bridge	325 m (1,066 ft)	765 m (2,510 ft)	Suspension; Steel truss deck, concrete pylons	European route E6; Rombaken	1964	Narvik; 68°26′28.9″N 17°42′20.3″E	Nordland	
18	Nærøysund Bridge	325 m (1,066 ft)	701 m (2,300 ft)	Suspension; Steel truss deck, concrete pylons	County Road 770; Nærøysundet	1981	Rørvik–Marøya; 64°51′00.9″N 11°13′07.5″E	Trøndelag	
19	Grenland Bridge	305 m (1,001 ft)	608 m (1,995 ft)	Cable-stayed; Concrete deck, concrete pylon 305+67	European route E18; Frierfjord	1996	Porsgrunn–Bamble; 59°03′11.3″N 9°40′31.8″E	Telemark	
20	Stolma Bridge	301 m (988 ft)	467 m (1,532 ft)	Box girder Prestressed concrete 94+301+72	County Road 151; Stolmasundet	1998	Stolmen–Selbjørn; 60°07′59.2″N 5°06′37.8″E	Vestland	
21	Raftsund Bridge	298 m (978 ft)	711 m (2,333 ft)	Box girder Prestressed concrete 125+298+202+86	European route E10; Raftsundet	1998	Hinnøya–Austvågøy; 68°27′24.6″N 15°11′35.5″E	Nordland	
22	Sundøy Bridge	298 m (978 ft)	538 m (1,765 ft)	Box girder Prestressed concrete 120+298+120	County Road 220	2003	Alsta–Sundøy; 66°01′16.4″N 12°56′03.2″E	Nordland	
23	Tjeldsund Bridge	290 m (950 ft)	1,007 m (3,304 ft)	Suspension; Steel truss deck, concrete pylons	European route E10; Tjeldsundet	1967	Hinnøya; 68°37′39.9″N 16°34′57.3″E	Troms	
24	Sandsfjord Bridge	290 m (950 ft)	580 m (1,900 ft)	Box girder Prestressed concrete 155+290+102	Road bridge Sandsfjord	2015	Suldal Municipality; 59°24′31.9″N 6°07′30.7″E	Rogaland	
25	Brevik Bridge	272 m (892 ft)	677 m (2,221 ft)	Suspension; Steel truss deck, concrete pylons	County Road 354; Frierfjord	1962	Brevik–Stathelle; 59°02′57.9″N 9°41′39.2″E	Telemark	
26	Kjellingstraumen Bridge	260 m (850 ft)	662 m (2,172 ft)	Suspension; Steel truss deck, concrete pylons	County Road 17; Kjellingsundet	1975	Gildeskål Municipality; 67°04′42.2″N 14°18′09.6″E	Nordland	
27	Varodd Bridge (1994)	260 m (850 ft)	663 m (2,175 ft)	Box girder Prestressed concrete Twin bridges	European route E18; Topdalsfjorden	1994; 2020	Kristiansand Municipality; 58°09′40.8″N 8°03′24.1″E	Agder	
28	Trysfjorden Bridge	260 m (850 ft)	537 m (1,762 ft)	Box girder Prestressed concrete	European route E39; Trysfjorden	2022	Kristiansand Municipality; 58°05′36.6″N 7°40′40.8″E	Agder	
29	Hagelsund Bridge	250 m (820 ft)	623 m (2,044 ft)	Suspension; Steel truss deck, concrete pylons	European route E39; Hagelsundet	1982	Flatøy–Knarvik; 60°32′36.0″N 5°16′22.2″E	Vestland	
30	Svinesund Bridge	247 m (810 ft)	704 m (2,310 ft)	Arch; Concrete through arch, steel box girder deck	European route E6; Iddefjord	2005	Halden–Strömstad; 59°05′39.4″N 11°15′07.0″E	Østfold; Sweden	
31	Tromøy Bridge	240 m (790 ft)	400 m (1,300 ft)	Suspension; Steel truss deck, concrete pylons	County Road 409; Tromøysundet	1961	Arendal Municipality; 58°28′16.4″N 8°49′20.9″E	Agder	
32	Tana Bridge	234 m (768 ft)	260 m (850 ft)	Cable-stayed; Steel box girder deck, steel pylon	European route E6; Tana	2020	Tana Bru, Tana Municipality; 70°11′53.7″N 28°11′58.4″E	Finnmark	
33	Hundvåkøy Bridge	233 m (764 ft)	460 m (1,510 ft)	Box girder Prestressed concrete	County Road 546	2007	Austevoll Municipality; 60°06′02.6″N 5°10′54.9″E	Vestland	
34	Norddalsfjord Bridge	231 m (758 ft)	401 m (1,316 ft)	Box girder Prestressed concrete	County Road 614; Norddalsfjorden	1987	Kinn Municipality; 61°37′58.2″N 5°20′04.5″E	Vestland	
35	Fyksesund Bridge	230 m (750 ft)	344 m (1,129 ft)	Suspension; Steel truss deck, concrete pylons	County Road 7 Fyksesund	1937	Øystese–Ålvik; 60°24′01.1″N 6°15′40.1″E	Vestland	
36	Erfjord Bridge	228 m (748 ft)	294 m (965 ft)	Suspension; Steel truss deck, concrete pylons	National Road 13; Erfjorden	1963	Suldal Municipality; 59°21′16.9″N 6°13′48.0″E	Rogaland	
37	Lokkaren Bridge	225 m (738 ft)	435 m (1,427 ft)	Suspension; Steel truss deck, concrete pylons	County Road 767; Lokkarsundet	1977	Namsos–Otterøya; 64°30′25.6″N 11°26′33.9″E	Trøndelag	
38	Folda Bridge	225 m (738 ft)	336 m (1,102 ft)	Suspension; Steel truss deck, concrete pylons	County Road 17; Folda	1969	Foldereid; 64°57′17.6″N 12°11′06.9″E	Trøndelag	
39	Støvset Bridge	220 m (720 ft)	420 m (1,380 ft)	Box girder Prestressed concrete	County Road 812; Misværfjorden	1993	Bodø Municipality; 67°12′14.2″N 14°57′52.8″E	Nordland	
40	Brandangersund Bridge	220 m (720 ft)	285 m (935 ft)	Arch; Steel tied arch Bow-string bridge	County Road 409; Brandangersundet	2010	Gulen Municipality; 60°53′53.6″N 5°01′33.1″E	Vestland	
41	Stokkøy Bridge	206 m (676 ft)	525 m (1,722 ft)	Box girder Prestressed concrete	County Road 723; Stokksundet	2000	Åfjord Municipality; 64°02′50.7″N 10°02′31.6″E	Trøndelag	
42	Randøy Bridge	202 m (663 ft)	202 m (663 ft)	Suspension; Steel truss deck, concrete pylons	County Road 650; Ølesundet Strait	1976	Hjelmeland Municipality; 59°13′06.2″N 6°05′50.6″E	Rogaland	
43	Kjerringstraum Bridge	200 m (660 ft)	551 m (1,808 ft)	Suspension; Steel truss deck, concrete pylon	European route E6; Kjerringvikstraumen	1969	Ballangen–Efjorden; 68°17′49.1″N 16°30′12.1″E	Nordland	

== Planned bridges ==
	Name	Span	Length	Type	Carries Crosses	Opened	Location	County	Ref.
1	Sognefjorden Bridge	3,700 m (12,100 ft)		Suspension	European route E39; Sognefjorden		Lavik–Gulen Municipality; 61°04′39.3″N 5°30′07.3″E	Vestland	
2	Julsund Bridge	1,625 m (5,331 ft)	2,010 m (6,590 ft)	Suspension	European route E39; Julsundet	2035	Molde–Otrøya; 62°44′00.6″N 6°57′10.5″E	Møre og Romsdal	
3	Bjørnafjord Bridge	450 m (1,480 ft)	5,475 m (17,963 ft)	Cable-stayed; 450+325	European route E39; Hordfast; Bjørnafjorden	2030	Søre Øyane–Tysnesøy; 60°06′30.4″N 5°21′44.4″E	Vestland	

== Alphabetical list ==
A

- Alversund Bridge (Alversund bru)
- Andøy Bridge (Andøybrua)
- Askøy Bridge (Askøybrua)
- Aursund Bridge (Aursundbrua)

B

- Bakkastraumen Bridge (Bakkastraumen bru)
- Beisfjord Bridge (Beisfjordbrua)
- Bekkestua Bridge (Bekkestua bru)
- Bergsøysund Bridge (Bergsøysund bru)
- Boknasund Bridge (Boknasund bru)
- Bolsøy Bridge (Bolsøybrua)
- Brattfoss Bridge (Brattfoss bru)
- Brattsund Bridge (Brattsund bru)
- Breisundet Bridge (Breisundet bru)
- Brekke Bridge (Brekke bru)
- Brevik Bridge (Breviksbrua)
- Brønnøysund Bridge (Brønnøysund bru)
- By Bridge (Bybrua)
- Bømla Bridge (Bømlabrua)
- Børøy Bridge (Børøybrua)

D

- Djupfjord Bridge (Djupfjordbrua)
- Djupfjordstraumen Bridge (Djupfjordstraumen bru)
- Drammen Bridge (Drammensbrua)
- Dromnessund Bridge (Dromnessundbrua)
- Dyrøy Bridge (Dyrøybrua)

E

- Efjord Bridges (Efjordbruene)
- Eiksund Bridge (Eiksundbrua)
- Einang Sound Bridge (Einangsundet bru)
- Elgeseter Bridge (Elgeseter bru)
- Engeløy Bridges (Engeløybruene)
- Engøysundet Bridge (Engøysundet bru)

F

- Flisa Bridge (Flisa bru)
- Folda Bridge (Folda bru)
- Fosseland Bridge (Fosseland bru)
- Frednes Bridge (Frednesbrua)
- Fredrikstad Bridge (Fredrikstad bru)
- Fredvang Bridges (Fredvangbruene)
- Fyksesund Bridge (Fyksesund bro)

G

- Gamle Bybro, Trondheim (see Old Town Bridge, Trondheim listed below)
- Geitøysundet Bridge
- Gimsøystraumen Bridge (Gimsøystraumen bru or Gimsøybrua)
- Giske Bridge (Giskebrua)
- Gisund Bridge (Gisundbrua)
- Gjemnessund Bridge (Gjemnessundbrua)
- Grenland Bridge (Grenlandsbrua)
- Gutufoss Bridge (Gutufoss bru)

H

- Hadsel Bridge (Hadselbrua)
- Hagelsund Bridge (Hagelsundbrua)
- Hålogaland Bridge (Hålogalandsbrua)
- Havøysund Bridge (Havøysund bru)
- Helgeland Bridge (Helgelandsbrua)
- Helland Bridge (Helland bru)
- Henningsvær Bridge (Henningsvær bru)
- Herøy Bridge (Herøybrua)
- Hestøy Bridge (Hestøybrua)
- Hognfjord Bridge (Hognfjordbrua) — see Kvalsaukan Bridge
- Hoholmen Bridge (Hoholmen bru)
- Hulvågen Bridges

I

- Ikjefjord Bridge (Ikjefjord bru)
- Indre Sunnan Bridge (Indre Sunnan bru)

J

- Julsrud Bridge (Julsrud bru)

K

- Kallestadsundet Bridge (Kallestadsundet bru) - Hordaland
- Kalvøyrevet Bridge (Kalvøyrevet bru)
- Kanalbrua - Tønsberg
- Kanstadstraumen Bridge (Kanstadstraumen bru)
- Karmsund Bridge (Karmsundbrua)
- Kilstraumen Bridge (Kilstraumen bru) - Hordaland
- Kjellingstraumen Bridge (Kjellingstraumen bru)
- Kjøllsæter Bridge (Kjøllsæterbrua)
- Kjerringstraumen Bridge (Kjerringstraumen bru)
- Knarrlagsundet Bridge (Knarrlagsundet bru)
- Krabbsundet Bridge (Krabbsundet bru)
- Krossnessund Bridge (Krossnessund bru)
- Kubholmleia Bridge (Kubholmleia bru)
- Kvalsaukan Bridge (Kvalsaukan bru)
- Kvalsund Bridge (Kvalsundbrua)
- Kvaløy Bridge (Kvaløybrua)
- Kylling Bridge (Kylling bru)
- Kåkern Bridge (Kåkern bru)

L

- Langangen Bridge (Langangen bru)
- Langnes Bridge (Langnes bru)
- Lille Lauvøysund Bridge
- Loftesnes Bridge (Loftesnes bru)
- Lokkaren Bridge (Lokkaren bru)
- Lysefjord Bridge (Lysefjordbrua)
- Løkke Bridge (Løkke bro)

M

- Marøysund Bridge (Marøysund bru)
- Mellastraumen Bridge (Mellastraumen bru)
- Midsund Bridge (Midsundbrua)
- Minnesund Bridge (new) (Minnesundbrua (nye))
- Minnesund Bridge (old) (Minnesundbrua (gamle))
- Mjosund Bridge (Mjosundbrua)
- Mjømnesund Bridge (Mjømnesundbrua)
- Mjøsa Bridge (Mjøsbrua)
- Mjøsund Bridge (Mjøsundbrua)
- Mjåsund Bridge (Mjåsund bru)
- Måløy Bridge (Måløybrua)

N

- Nappsund Bridge (Nappsundbrua)
- Nerlandsøy Bridge (Nerlandsøybrua)
- New Eidsvoll Bridge (Nye Eidsvoll bru)
- New Fetsund Bridge (Fetsund nye bru)
- Norddalsfjord Bridge (Norddalsfjord bru)
- Nordhordland Bridge (Nordhordlandsbrua)
- Nordsund Bridge, Kristiansund (Nordsundbrua, Kristiansund)
- Nærøysund Bridge (Nærøysund bru)

O

- Old City Bridge, Trondheim (Gamle Bybro, Trondheim)
- Old Namsen Bridge (Gamle Namsenbrua)
- Oldersund Bridge (Oldersund bru)
- Omsund Bridge (Omsund bru)
- Osenstraumen Bridge (Osenstraumen bru)
- Osstrupen Bridge (Osstrupen bru)
- Osterøy Bridge (Osterøybrua)

P

- Porsgrunn Bridge (Porsgrunnbrua)
- Puddefjord Bridge (Puddefjordsbroen)
- Puttesund Bridge (Puttesund bro)

R

- Raftsund Bridge (Raftsundbrua)
- Ramsund Bridge (Ramsundbrua)
- Randøy Bridge (Randøy bru)
- Reine Bridges (Reinebruene)
- Remøy Bridge (Remøybrua)
- Rombak Bridge (Rombaksbrua)
- Rongsund Bridge (Rongsundbrua)
- Rugsund Bridge (Rugsund bru)
- Runde Bridge (Rundebrua)
- Røssesund Bridge (Røssesundbrua or Røssesund bro)
- Røssøystraumen Bridge (Røssøystraumen bru)
- Rånåsfoss Bridge (Rånåsfoss bru)

S

- Saltstraumen Bridge (Saltstraumen bru)
- Sami Bridge (Sameland bru)
- Sandhornøy Bridge (Sandhornøy bru)
- Sandnessund Bridge (Sandnessundbrua)
- Sannesund Bridge (Sannesundbrua)
- Selbjørn Bridge (Selbjørn bru)
- Skarnsund Bridge (Skarnsundbrua)
- Skattørsundet Bridge (Skattørsundet bru)
- Skjeggestad Bridge (Skjeggestad bru)
- Skjervøy Bridge (Skjervøybrua)
- Skjomen Bridge (Skjomen bru)
- Skodje Bridge (Skodje bru)
- Smaalenene Bridge (Smålenene bru)
- Smines Bridge (Sminesbrua)
- Sneppen Bridge (Sneppen bru)
- Sommarøy Bridge (Sommarøybrua)
- Sortland Bridge (Sortlandsbrua)
- Sotra Bridge (Sotrabrua)
- Spissøy Bridge (Spissøybrua)
- Stavanger City Bridge (Stavanger bybru)
- Stokkøy Bridge (Stokkøybrua)
- Stolma Bridge (Stolma bru)
- Stord Bridge (Stordabrua)
- Store Lauvøysund Bridge
- Storseisundet Bridge (Storseisundet bru)
- Straumsund Bridge (Straumsundbrua)
- Strømmen Bridge (Strømmen bru)
- Støvset Bridge (Støvset bru)
- Sundklakkstraumen Bridge (Sundklakkstraumen bru)
- Sundøy Bridge (Sundøybrua)
- Svinesund Bridge (Svinesundbruene)
- Svinøy Bridge (Svinøybrua)
- Sykkylven Bridge (Sykkylvsbrua)
- Sørstraumen Bridge (Efjord) (Sørstraumen bru)
- Sørstraumen Bridge (Kvænangen) (Sørstraumen bru)
- Sørsund Bridge, Kristiansund (Sørsundbrua, Kristiansund)

T

- Tana Bridge (Tana bru)
- Tiendeholmen Bridge (Tiendeholmen bru)
- Tjeldsund Bridge (Tjeldsundbrua)
- Tjønnøy Bridge (Tjønnøy bru)
- Trengsel Bridge (Trengsel bru)
- Tromsø Bridge (Tromsøbrua)
- Tromøy Bridge (Tromøybrua)
- Turøy Bridge (Turøy bru)

U

- Ullasund Bridge (Ullasundbrua)
- Ulnes Bridge (Ulnes bru)

V

- Valsøy Bridge (Valsøybrua)
- Varodd Bridge (Varoddbruene)
- Vassås Bridge (Vassås bru)
- Vevangstraumen Bridge
- Vrengen Bridge (Vrengen bro)

W

- West Bridge (Vesterbrua, Kristiansand)

Å

- Åkviksundet Bridge (Åkviksundet bru)
- Åselistraumen Bridge (Åselistraumen bru)

== Notes and references ==
- Vegvalg, Nasjonal verneplan : Veger - Bruer: Vegrelaterte kulturminner (in Norwegian). The Norwegian Public Roads Administration. 2002. ISBN 82-91130-20-5 – via Nasjonalbiblioteket.
- "Aas-Jakobsen civil engineering consulting, Oslo".
- Nicolas Janberg. "International Database for Civil and Structural Engineering". Structurae.com.
- Others references

== See also ==
- List of bridges in Norway by length
- Transport in Norway
- Rail transport in Norway
- Geography of Norway
- National Protection Plan for Roads, Bridges, and Road-Related Cultural Heritage
- National Tourist Routes in Norway
