= Kanstadstraumen Bridge =

Kanstadstraumen Bridge Kanstadstraumenbrua
- Coordinates: 68°27′55″N 15°53′06″E
- Carries: Fv837
- Crosses: Kanstadfjorden
- Locale: Lødingen Municipality, Norway

Characteristics
- Material: Pre-stressed concrete
- Total length: 160 metres (520 ft)
- Longest span: 80 metres (260 ft)

History
- Construction end: 12 December 1976

The Kanstadstraumen Bridge (Norwegian: Kanstadstraumen bru) is a cantilever road bridge that crosses the Kanstadfjorden in Lødingen Municipality in Nordland county, Norway. The bridge is 160 metres (520 ft) long and the main span is 80 metres (260 ft). The bridge connects the western part of the municipality to the rest of the municipality. The bridge is a box girder design made out of pre-stressed concrete and it was completed on 12 December 1976.

== See also ==
- List of bridges in Norway
- List of bridges in Norway by length
- List of bridges
- List of bridges by length
