= Skodje Bridge =

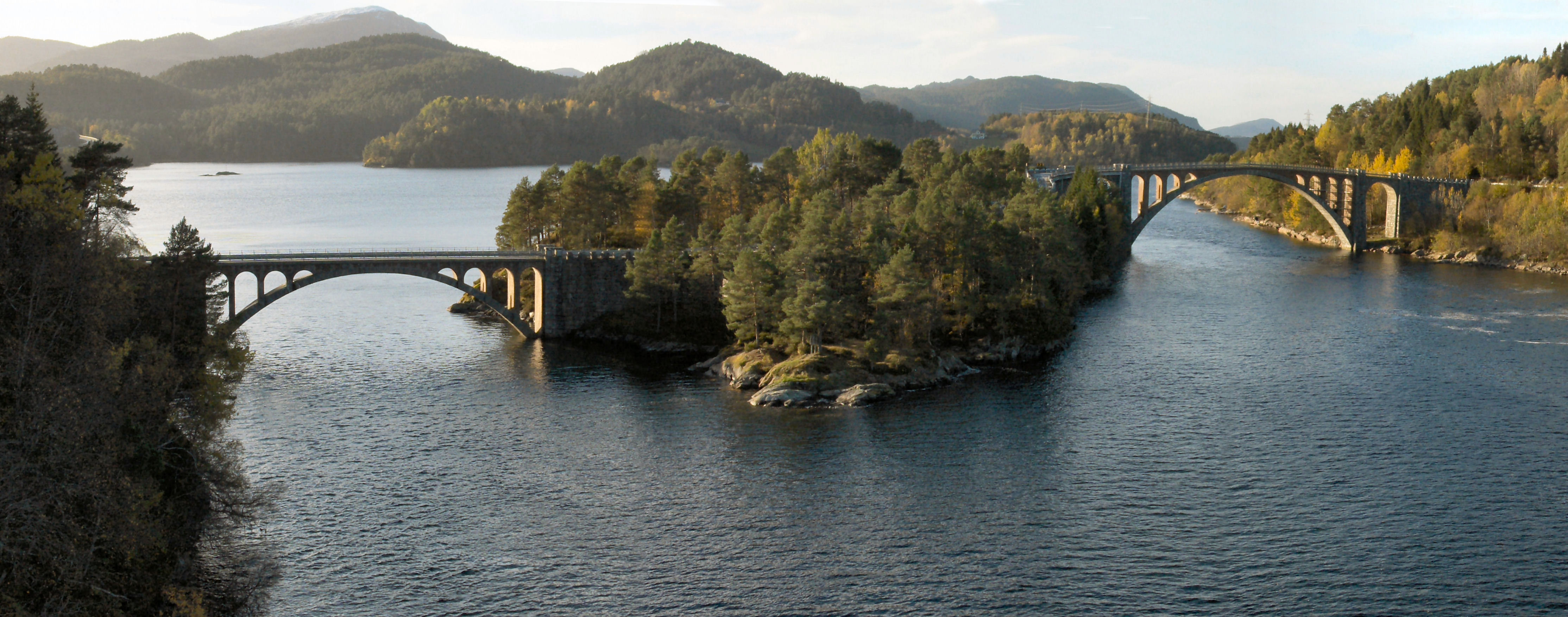
- The old bridges from 1922 seen from the new Straumsbrua towards Ellingsøyfjorden
- Coordinates: 62°30′08″N 006°37′06″E
- Carries: Fv661
- Crosses: Skodjestraumen
- Locale: Ålesund Municipality, Norway

The Skodje Bridge (Norwegian: Skodje bru) is a bridge that crosses the Skodjestraumen in Ålesund Municipality in Møre og Romsdal county, Norway. It is located 5 kilometres (3.1 mi) south of the village of Tennfjord, 3.5 kilometres (2.2 mi) west of Skodje, and 4.5 kilometres (2.8 mi) northwest of Valle.

There are actually three bridges over Skodjestraumen. The newest bridge is called the Straum Bridge (Norwegian: Straumsbrua). It is a steel arch bridge that is 290 metres (950 ft) long. It was opened on 3 July 2004. It replaced the old Skodje Bridge. This new bridge is a toll bridge.

== History ==
On 10 August 1880, two teachers wrote to the local council, requesting a road, going from the main road by Svortavatnet, to the Vatne lake, with a bridge over Straumen. It was not until 1909 that the local council agreed to pay 27,000 kr to start the work on the bridge. Chief engineer Hovdenakk, from the Public Roads Administration office in Molde, constructed and led the work on the bridge.

=== Old bridges ===
The two old Skodje Bridges are also arch bridges, the longest masonry arch road bridge in Norway. The longer one is approximately 100 metres (330 ft) with a span of 59 m and a maximum clearance to the sea of 14 metres (46 ft). The building of the old bridges started in 1911 and were opened in 1922. They cost 480,000 kr.

The old bridges still stand, but are not in a good shape. For the last few years before the new bridge was opened, the old bridges had restrictions on the weight and width of the cars that crossed it, and that meant that heavier traffic had to take a longer road through the village of Skodje. This was of course very impractical. With the new bridge in operation, the old bridges are now open only for pedestrians.

== Gallery ==
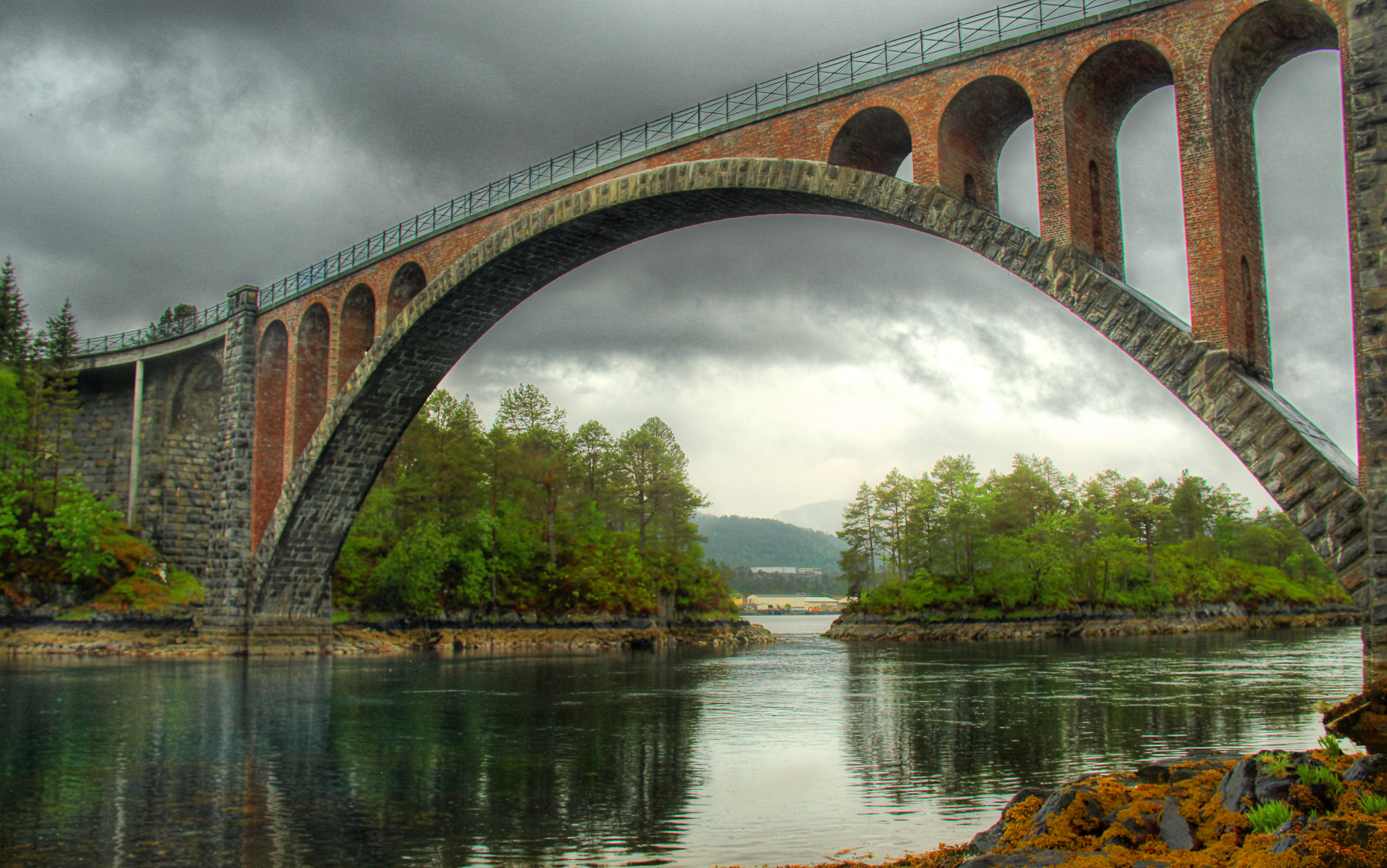
Old Skodje Bridge

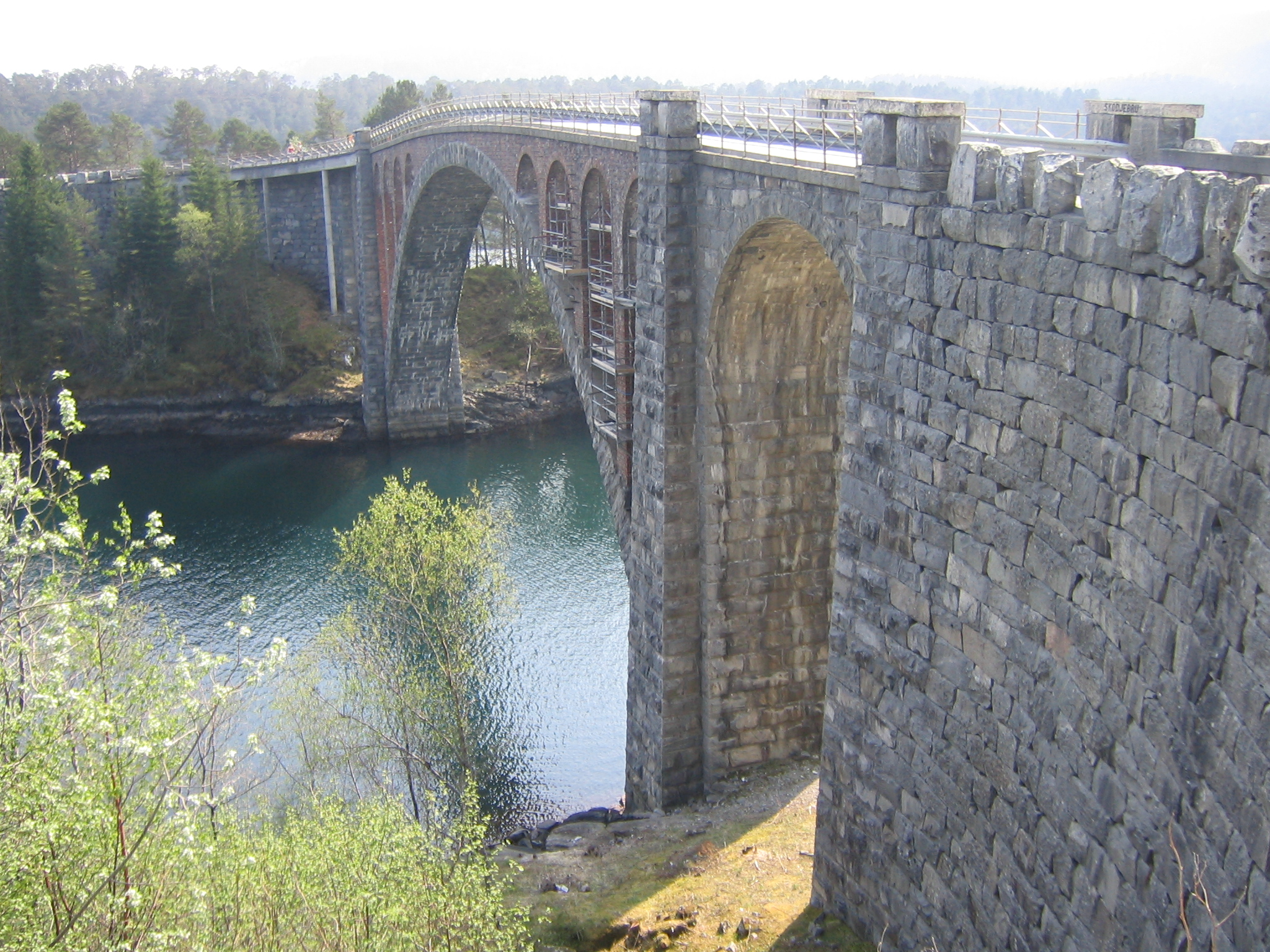
Old Skodje Bridge

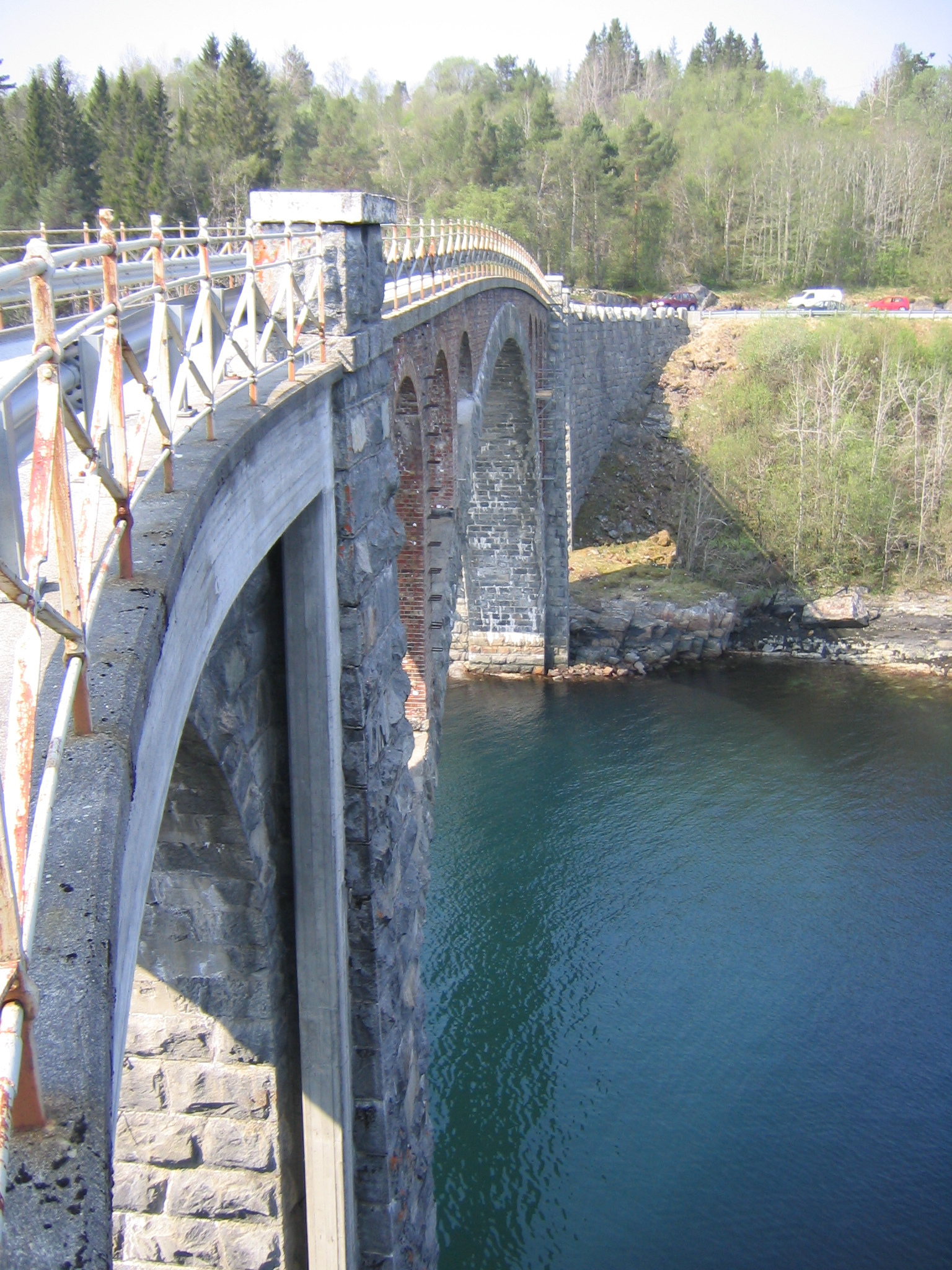
Old Skodje Bridge detail

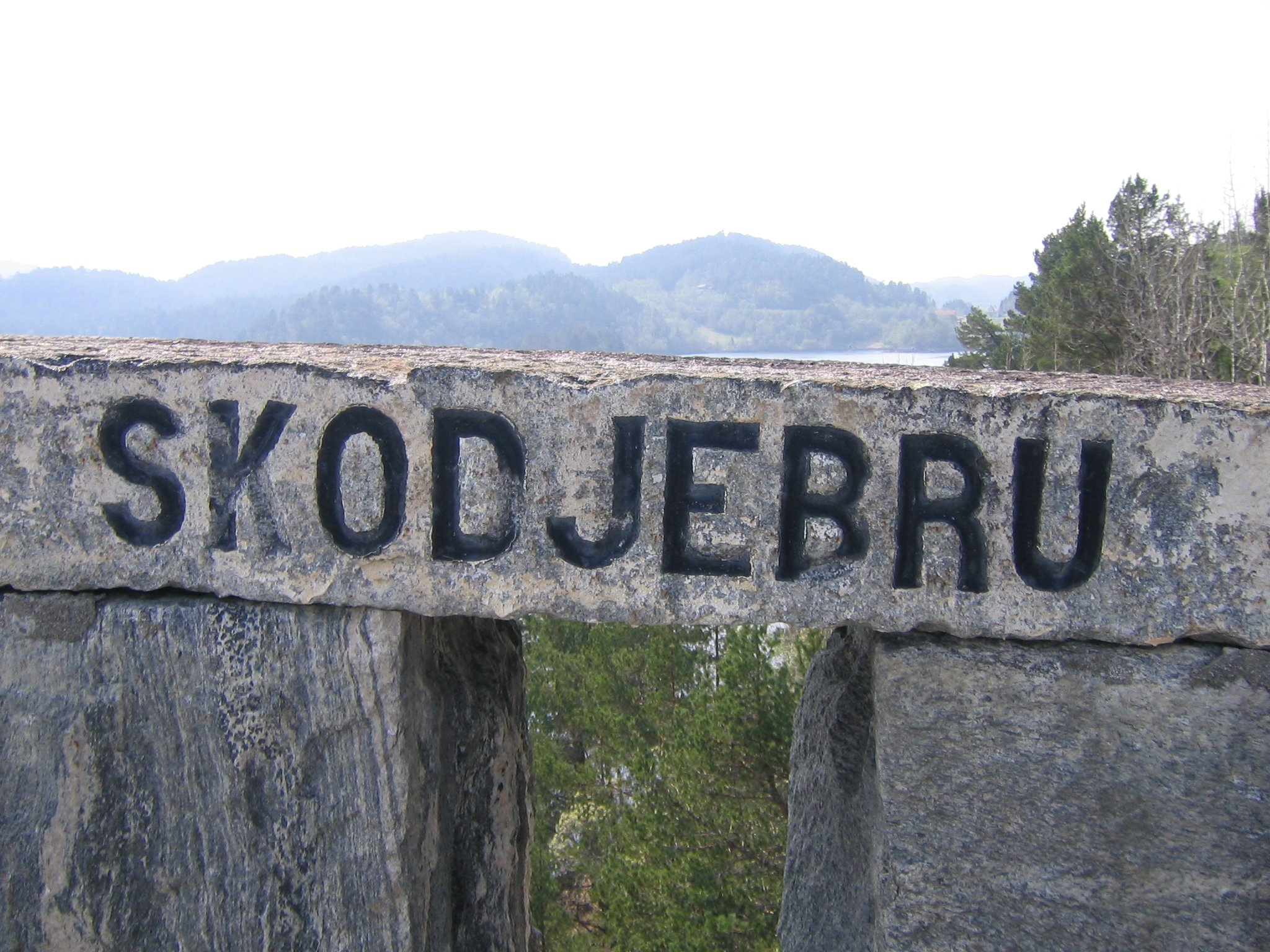
Skodjebru name plate

== Photographs ==
- New Bridge
- Old Bridge

== See also ==
- List of bridges in Norway
- List of bridges in Norway by length
- List of bridges
- List of bridges by length
- List of longest masonry arch bridge spans
