= Djupfjord Bridge =

Djupfjord Bridge Djupfjordbrua
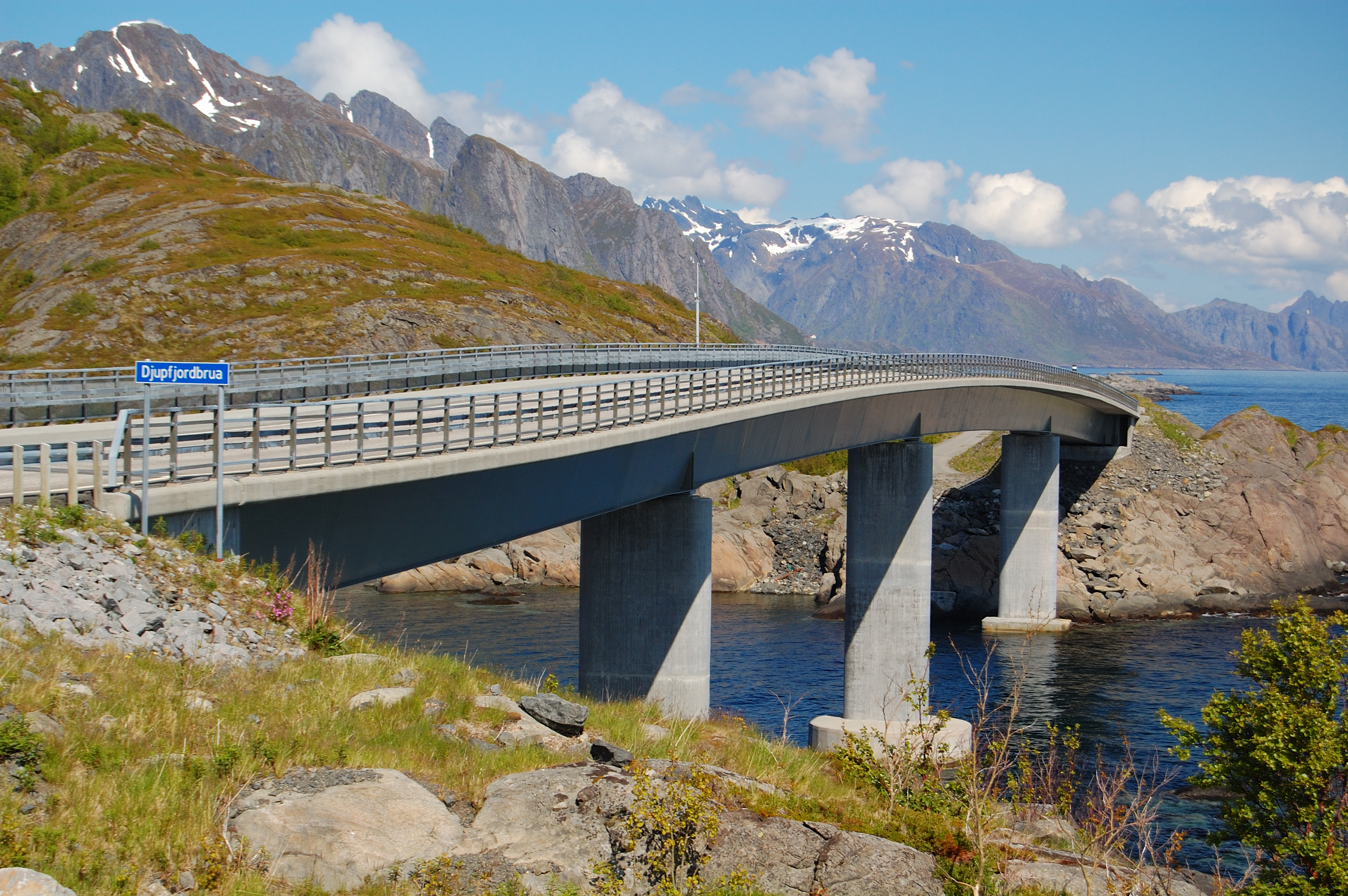
- View of the bridge
- Coordinates: 67.9136°N 13.0777°E

Characteristics
- Total length: 259 metres (850 ft)

History
- Construction cost: 57 million kr
- Opened: 3 June 2003

The Djupfjord Bridge (Norwegian: Djupfjordbrua) is a bridge that crosses the Djupfjorden in Moskenes Municipality in Nordland county, Norway. The bridge is 259 metres (850 ft) long. It was opened on 3 June 2003 and replaced an older bridge at the same place. The building of the bridge took two years, which was longer than planned, due to problems with the strong current in the fjord, waves and wind. The bridge, access roads and demolition of the old bridge cost approximately 57 million kr.

The old Djupfjord Bridge was a suspension bridge, and was built in 1959.

== See also ==
- List of bridges in Norway
- List of bridges in Norway by length
- List of bridges
- List of bridges by length
