= Åselistraumen Bridge =

Åselistraumen Bridge Åselistraumen bru / Åselibrua
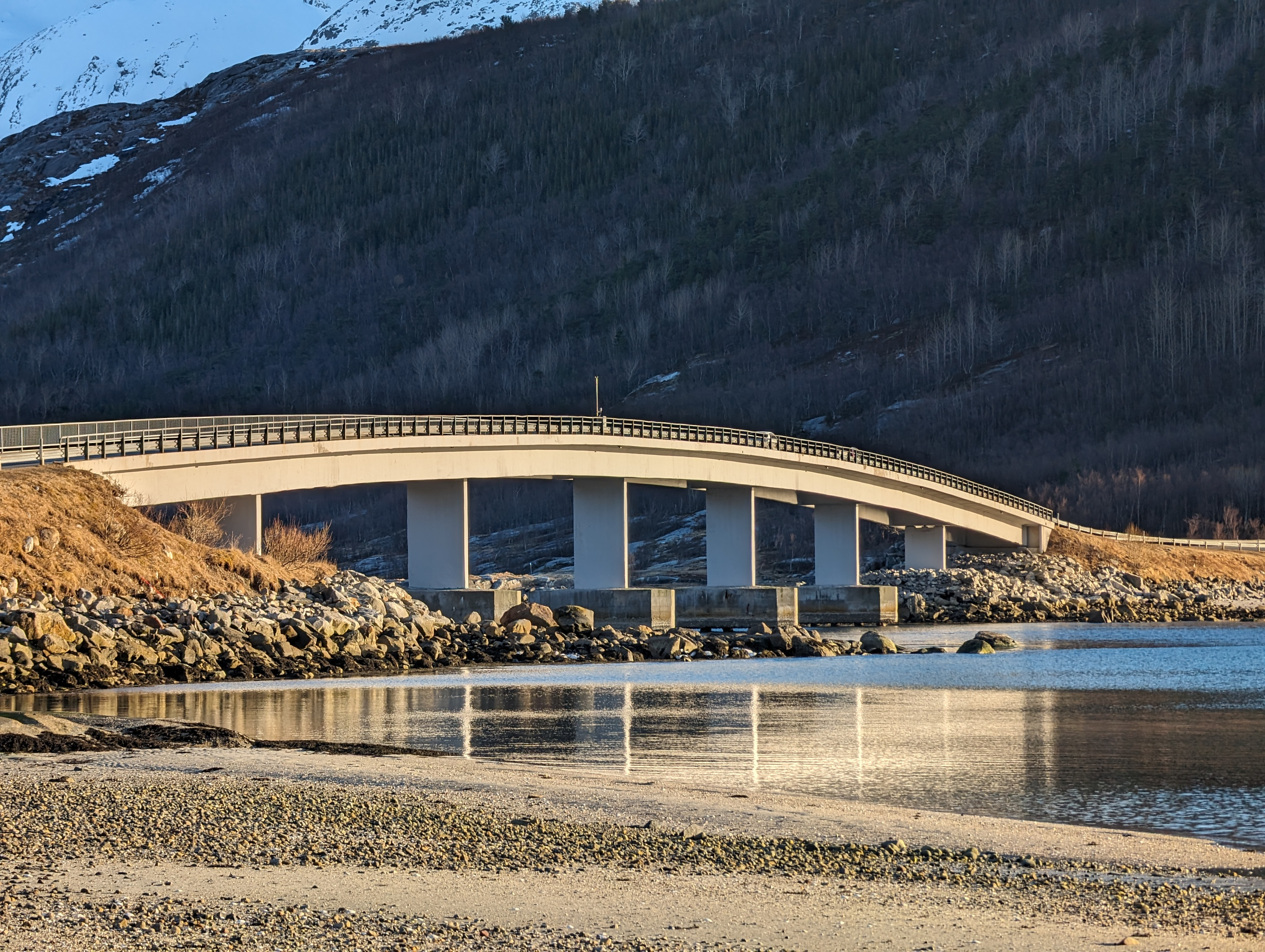
- View of the bridge
- Coordinates: 67°11′51″N 14°37′55″E
- Carries: Fv17
- Crosses: Åselistraumen
- Locale: Bodø, Norway

Characteristics
- Material: Concrete
- Total length: 200 metres (660 ft)
- Longest span: 30 metres (98 ft)

Location
- Interactive map of Åselistraumen Bridge

The Åselistraumen Bridge (Norwegian: Åselistraumen bru or Åselibrua) is a bridge that crosses the Åselistraumen strait in Bodø Municipality in Nordland county, Norway. The concrete bridge is part of Norwegian County Road 17. It is 200 metres (660 ft) long and the longest span is 30 metres (98 ft).

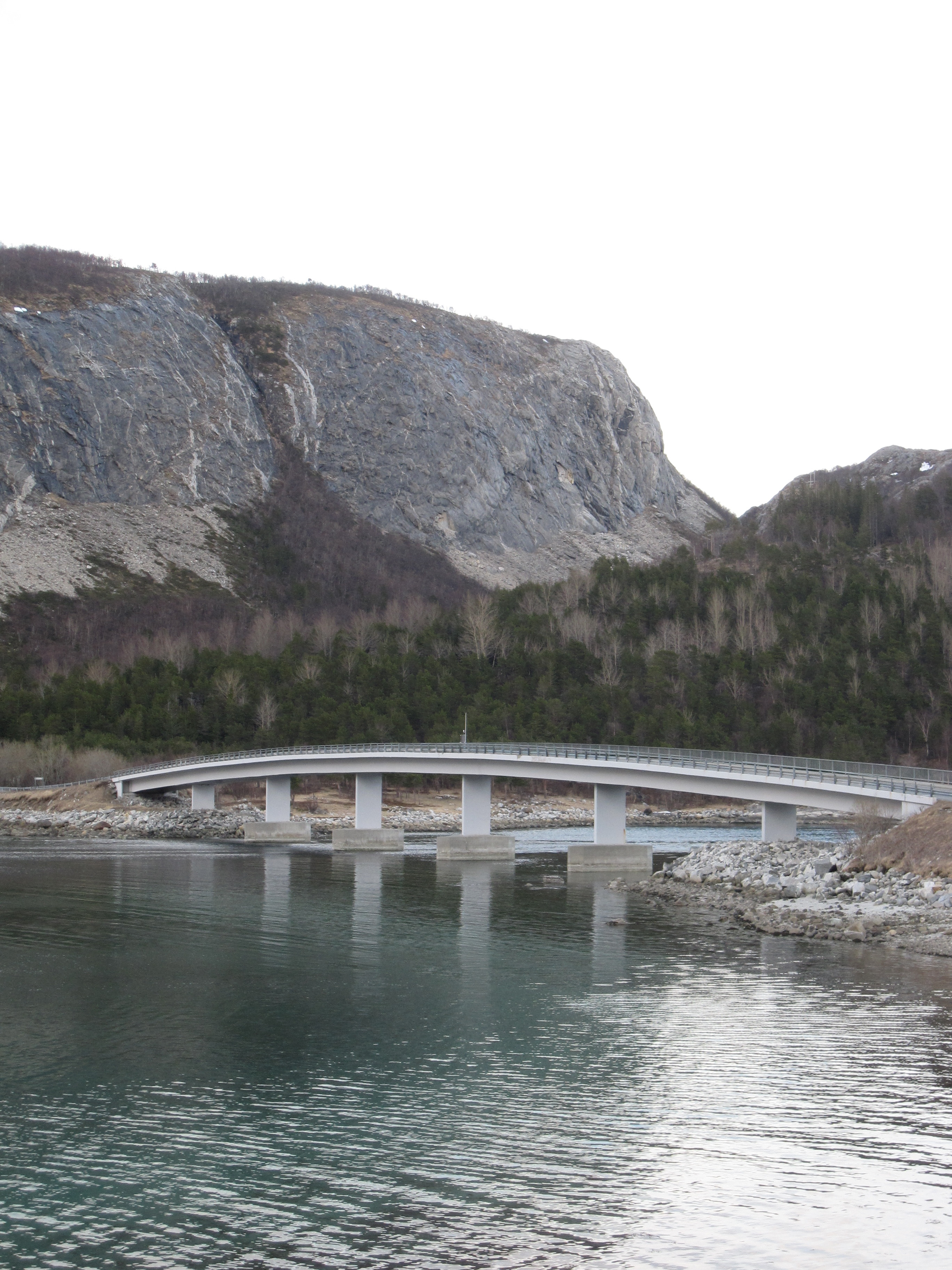
View of the bridge

== See also ==
- List of bridges in Norway
- List of bridges in Norway by length
- List of bridges
- List of bridges by length
