= Porsgrunn Bridge =

Highway bridge in Telemark, Norway

Porsgrunn Bridge Porsgrunnsbrua
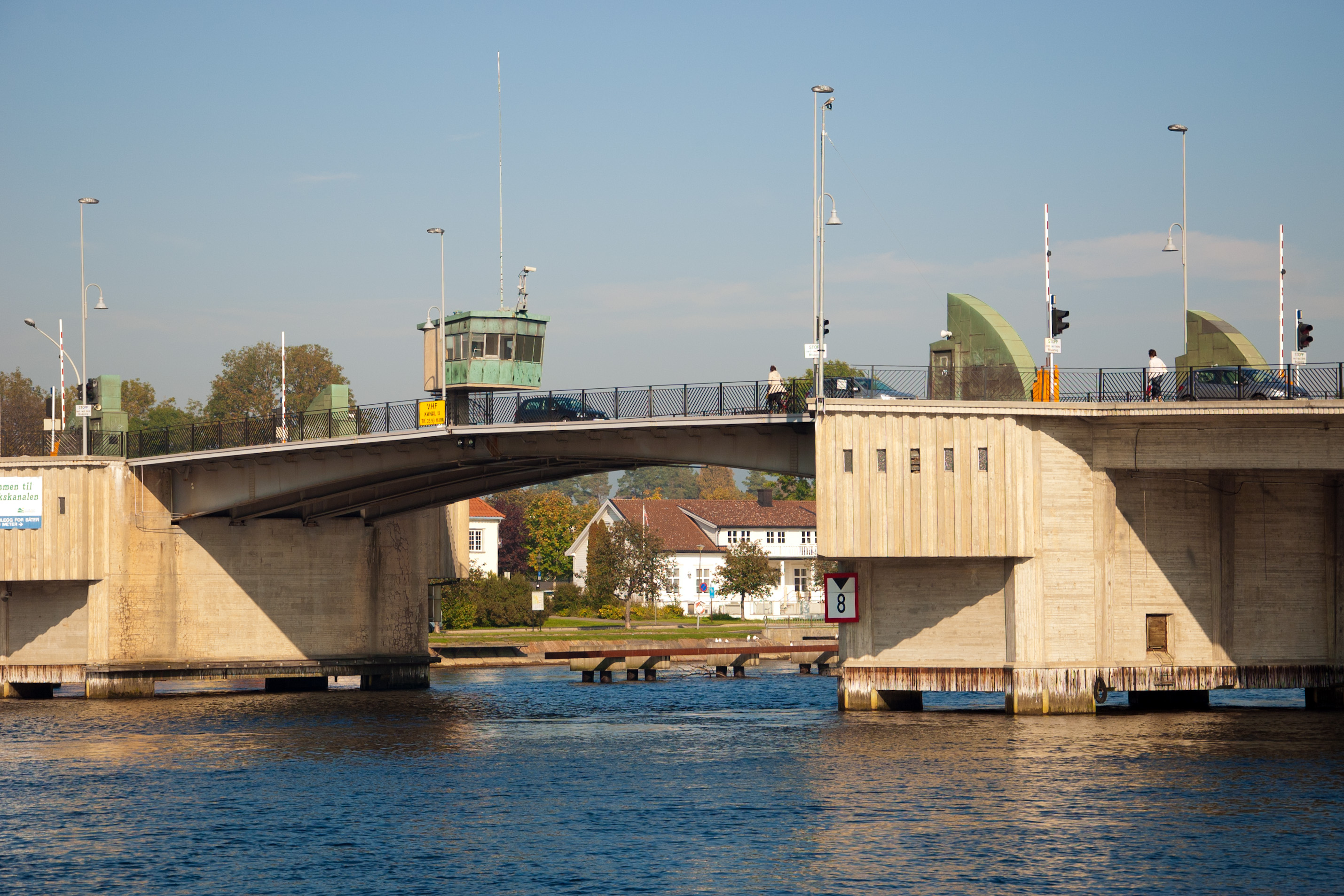
- View of the Porsgrunn bridge in Fylkesvei 356 in Porsgrunn
- Coordinates: 59°08′23″N 9°38′30″E
- Carries: Fv356
- Crosses: Porsgrunn River
- Locale: Porsgrunn

Characteristics
- Design: Bascule bridge
- Material: Concrete and steel
- Total length: 283 metres (928 ft)
- Longest span: 40.4 metres (133 ft)
- Clearance below: 8 metres (26 ft)

History
- Construction end: 13 Oct 1957

Porsgrunn Bridge (Norwegian: Porsgrunnsbrua) is a drawbridge constructed of concrete and steel. It is located in the town of Porsgrunn which is located in Porsgrunn Municipality in Telemark county, Norway. The bridge, which was completed on 13 October 1957, connects the eastern and western sides of the town center of Porsgrunn. It crosses the Porsgrunn River just east of the Frednes Bridge and about 3 kilometres (1.9 mi) near where the river empties into the Frierfjord. The bridge is about 283 metres (928 ft) long with a 40.4-metre (133 ft) long main span. Boat traffic beneath the bridge has an 8-metre (26 ft) bridge clearance.

== See also ==
- List of bridges in Norway
- List of bridges in Norway by length
