= Leirfjorden =

Fjord in Nordland, Norway

- Interactive map of the fjord
- Location: Nordland county, Norway
- Coordinates: 66.0297°N 12.6847°E
- Type: Fjord
- Basin countries: Norway
- Max. length: 20 kilometres (12 mi)

Leirfjorden is a fjord in Leirfjord Municipality and Alstahaug Municipality in Nordland county, Norway. The 20-kilometre (12 mi) long fjord is located east of the town of Sandnessjøen, between the mainland and the island of Alsta. There is a short strait that connects it to the Vefsnfjorden to the south.

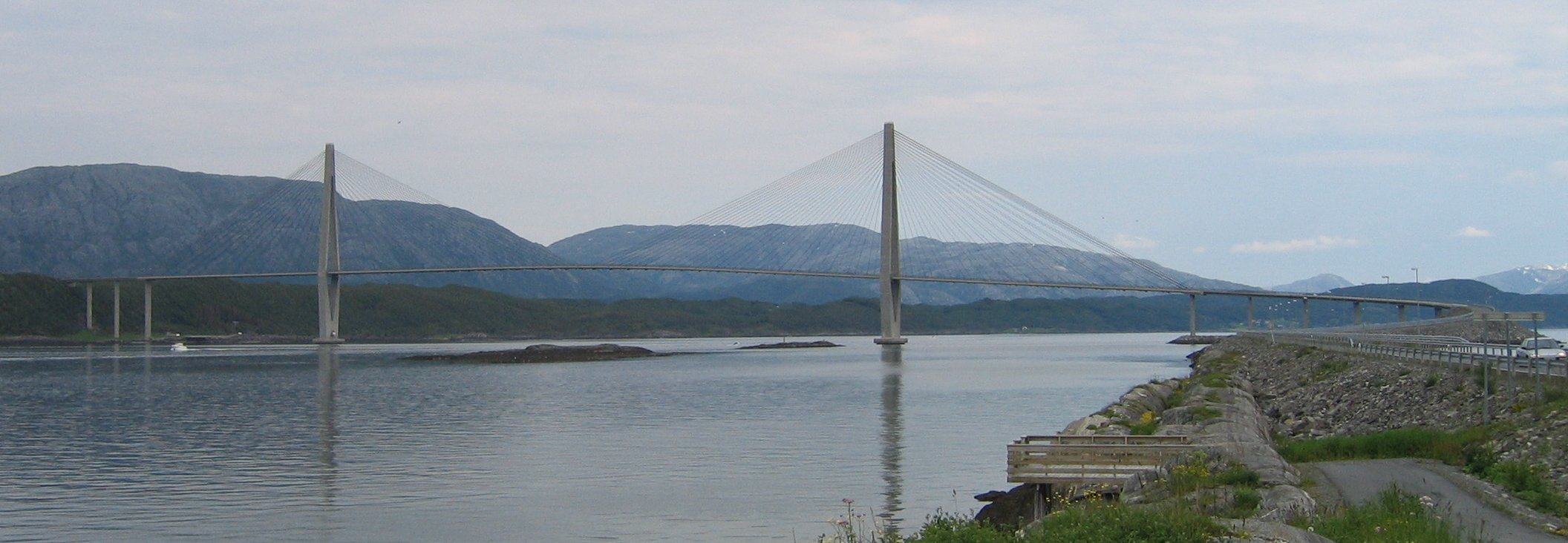
View of the Helgeland Bridge over the Leirfjorden

There are two bridges that cross it: Helgeland Bridge in the west and Sundøy Bridge in the south. The village of Leland lies on the northern coast and the village of Sundøya lies on the southern coast.

== See also ==
- List of Norwegian fjords
