= Porsgrunn (disambiguation) =

Porsgrunn or Porsgrund may refer to:

== Places ==
- Porsgrunn Municipality, a municipality in Telemark county, Norway
- Porsgrunn (town), a town within Porsgrunn Municipality in Telemark county, Norway
- Porsgrunn/Skien, a multi-municipality metropolitan area in Telemark county, Norway
- Porsgrunn Upper Secondary School, a school within Porsgrunn Municipality in Telemark county, Norway

== Business ==
- Porsgrund Porcelain Factory, a porcelain flatware company located at Porsgrunn in Telemark county, Norway.

== Transportation ==
- Porsgrunn Station, a railway station within Porsgrunn Municipality in Telemark county, Norway
- Porsgrunn Bridge, a road bridge in Porsgrunn Municipality in Telemark county, Norway
