= Grov, Kinn =

Village in Kinn Municipality, Norway

Grov
- Village
- Interactive map of Grov
- Location within Vestland Location within Norway
- Coordinates: 61.61505°N 5.32223°E
- Country: Norway
- Region: Western Norway
- County: Vestland
- District: Sunnfjord
- Municipality: Kinn Municipality
- Elevation: 54 m (177 ft)
- Time zone: UTC+01:00 (CET)
  - Summer (DST): UTC+02:00 (CEST)
- Post Code: 6900 Florø

Grov is a small village in Kinn Municipality in Vestland county, Norway. Grov lies along the Eikefjorden at the junction of the highways Rv.5 and Fv.614, just a couple kilometres south of the Norddalsfjord Bridge. Grov is located about 10 kilometres (6.2 mi) east of the village of Brandsøy and 15 kilometres (9.3 mi) east of the town of Florø along Rv.5, and about 8 kilometres (5.0 mi) to the west is the village of Eikefjord. The Tonheim-Grov area had 100 inhabitants in 2001.
