= Frednes Bridge =

Highway bridge in Telemark, Norway

Frednes Bridge Frednesbrua
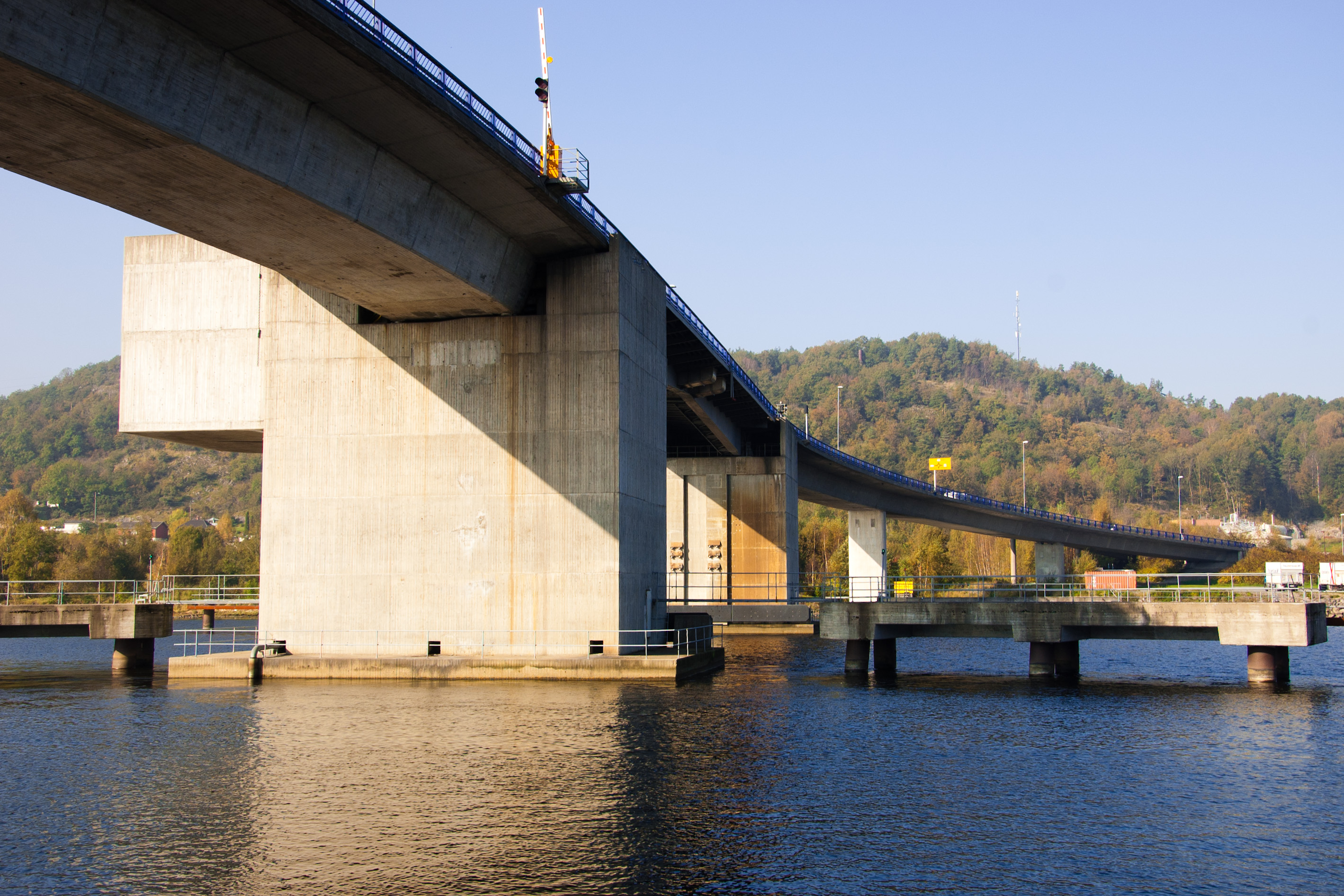
- View of the bridge
- Coordinates: 59°08′04″N 9°37′50″E
- Carries: Rv36
- Crosses: Porsgrunn River
- Locale: Porsgrunn

Characteristics
- Design: Double-leaf bascule bridge
- Material: Concrete and steel
- Total length: 461.5 metres (1,514 ft)
- Longest span: 60 metres (200 ft)
- Clearance below: 13 metres (43 ft)

Location
- Interactive map of Frednes Bridge

Frednes Bridge (Norwegian: Frednesbrua) is a double-leaf bascule bridge on Highway 356 in Porsgrunn Municipality in Telemark county, Norway. The 461.5-metre (1,514 ft) long bridge crosses the Porsgrunn River (Porsgrunnselva) just before it flows out into the Frierfjord at the site of Norsk Hydro's factory complex on Herøya.

The bridge was completed in 1995. It is constructed of prestressed concrete with a steel drawbridge span over the main channel. It is 461 metres (1,512 ft) long, with a main span of 60 metres (200 ft), and beneath it, there is a clearance for vessels of 13 metres (43 ft) at mean water level.

Frednes was the historic name of an old district of the town of Porsgrunn as well as the name of the Frednes farm. Frednes was purchased by shipping magnate Christen Knudsen who moved there with his family in 1855. The manor house was expanded in 1865, but burned down in 1952 and was not rebuilt.

== See also ==
- List of bridges in Norway
- List of bridges in Norway by length
