= Støvset Bridge =

Støvset Bridge Støvset bru
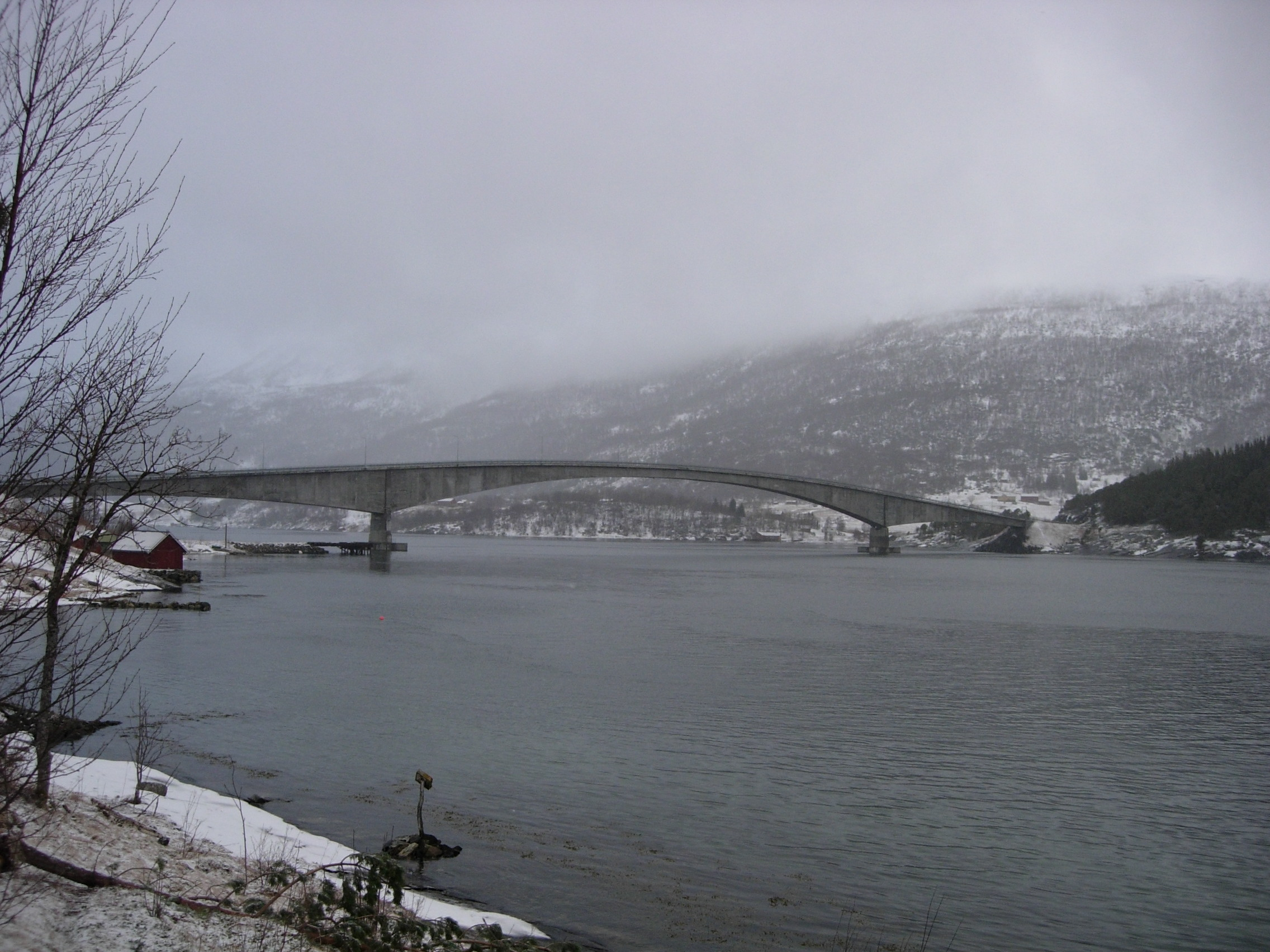
- View of the bridge
- Coordinates: 67°12′N 14°58′E
- Carries: Fv812
- Crosses: Misværfjorden
- Locale: Bodø Municipality

Characteristics
- Design: Cantilever bridge
- Material: Concrete
- Total length: 420 metres (1,380 ft)
- Longest span: 220 metres (720 ft)
- No. of spans: 3
- Clearance below: 20 metres (66 ft)

History
- Opened: 1993

The Støvset Bridge (Norwegian: Støvset bru) is a cantilever bridge in Bodø Municipality in Nordland county, Norway. The bridge carries an arm of the Norwegian County Road 812 over the Misværfjorden. The 420-metre (1,380 ft) long bridge has 3 spans with the main span measuring 220 metres (720 ft). The Støvset Bridge was opened in 1993.

== See also ==
- List of bridges in Norway
- List of bridges in Norway by length
- List of bridges
- List of bridges by length
