= Nordal Church =

Church in Vestland, Norway

- Nordal kyrkje
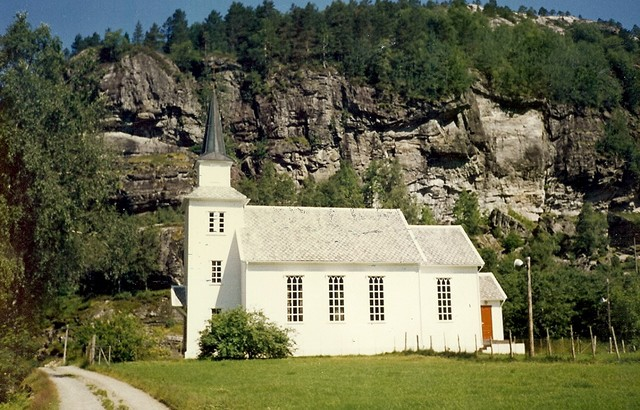
- View of the church
- Nordal Church
- 61°38′34″N 5°22′43″E
- Location: Kinn Municipality, Vestland
- Country: Norway
- Denomination: Church of Norway
- Churchmanship: Evangelical Lutheran

History
- Former name: Norddalsfjord Chapel
- Status: Parish church
- Founded: 1898
- Consecrated: 14 Sept 1898

Architecture
- Functional status: Active
- Architect: Jacob Wilhelm Nordan
- Architectural type: Long church
- Completed: 1898 (128 years ago)

Specifications
- Capacity: 200
- Materials: Wood

Administration
- Diocese: Bjørgvin bispedømme
- Deanery: Sunnfjord prosti
- Parish: Nordal
- Norwegian Cultural Heritage Site
- Type: Church
- Status: Not protected
- ID: 85142

Nordal Church (Norwegian: Nordal kyrkje) is a parish church of the Church of Norway in Kinn Municipality in Vestland county, Norway. It is located in the small village of Norddalsfjord, and it serves the northeastern part of the municipality. It is the church for the Nordal parish which is part of the Sunnfjord prosti (deanery) in the Diocese of Bjørgvin. The white, wooden church was built in a long church design in 1898 using plans drawn up by the architect Jacob Wilhelm Nordan. The church seats about 200 people.

== History ==
The people of Norddalsfjorden had belonged to the parish of Bru for a long time, which meant they had an extremely long and strenuous way to get to church which was located on the island of Svanøya. From the upper parts of the Grøndalen valley down to the fjord it was a distance of 20 kilometres (12 mi) which included crossing five lakes by boat. From the fjord to Bru Church, it was another 40 kilometres (25 mi) across the sea, which took about four hours by row boat (if the weather was fine). They had to go all the way to the Svanøy Church, not only for ordinary worship services, but also for baptism ceremonies, weddings, and funerals.

A new cemetery was consecrated in the Norddalsfjorden area on 17 November 1869. This helped the local residents, but not long after this, they began to desire their own church. In 1887, the local residents formally requested their own church, and two years after that, the decision was made to get started on the project. Fundraising began in 1889. The people in the valley had raised 2000 kr, and the same sum was allocated by the Norwegian Parliament and Kinn Municipality. The "Kinn Sparebank" (savings bank) also donated 1500 kr, so the total sum raised was 7500 kr which was enough to cover the construction costs. The building was constructed in 1898 by the builder Anders Korsvold. The new church was consecrated on 14 September 1898 by the local Dean Andreas D. Jespersen.

At first, the parish vicar was somewhat reluctant to have a new church building because this implied that he would have to travel more frequently. Furthermore, when the church was completed, he tried to confine the services to the summer months, but the parish council objected. In the first years, services were held five times a year, preferably in the winter. Nowadays services are held fourteen times a year. Electric heating was installed in the building in 1964, but it was not until 1994 that electric lighting was installed in the building. On 1 January 1998, the church was separated from Bru and formed its own parish within the municipality.

== Media gallery ==
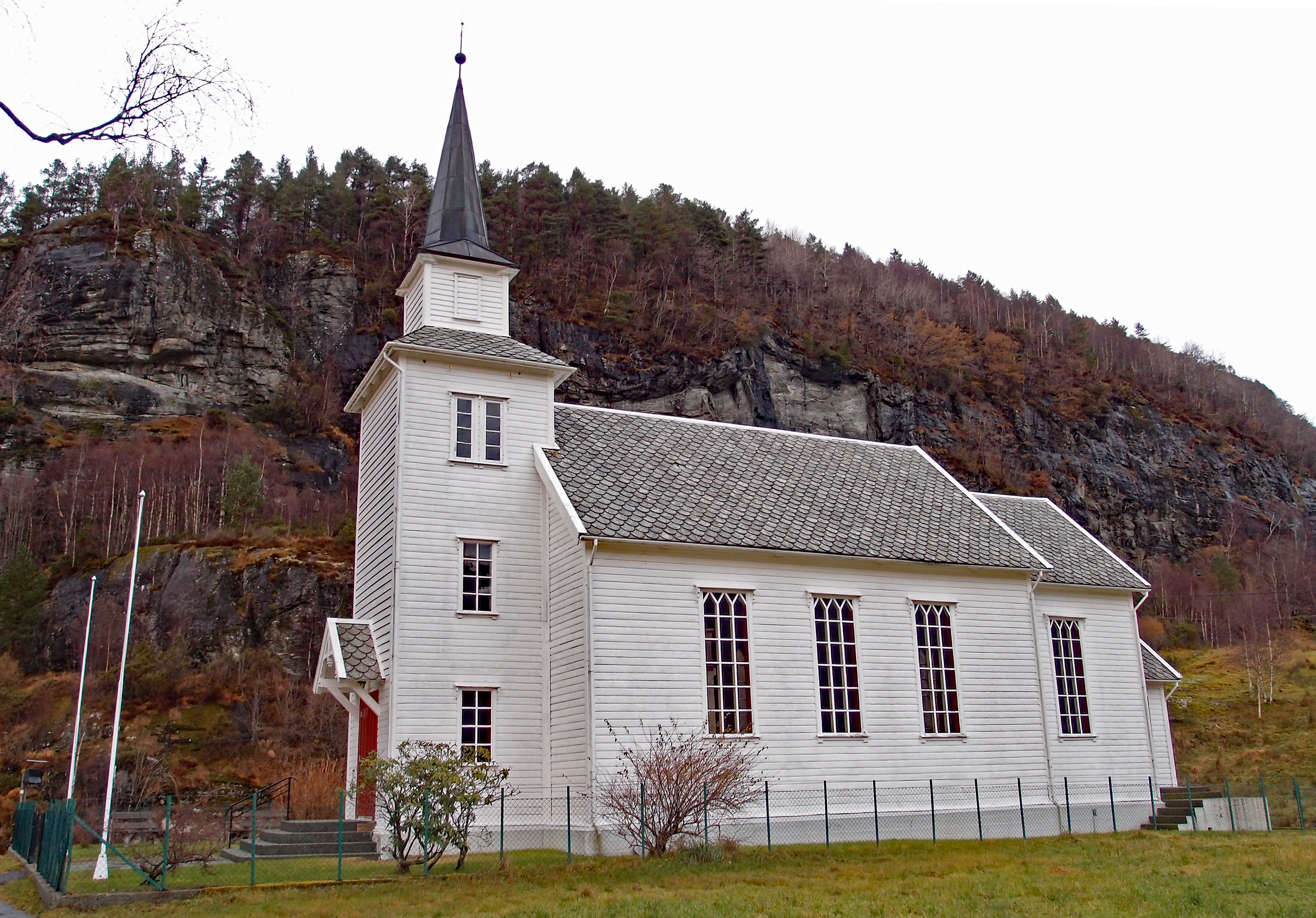

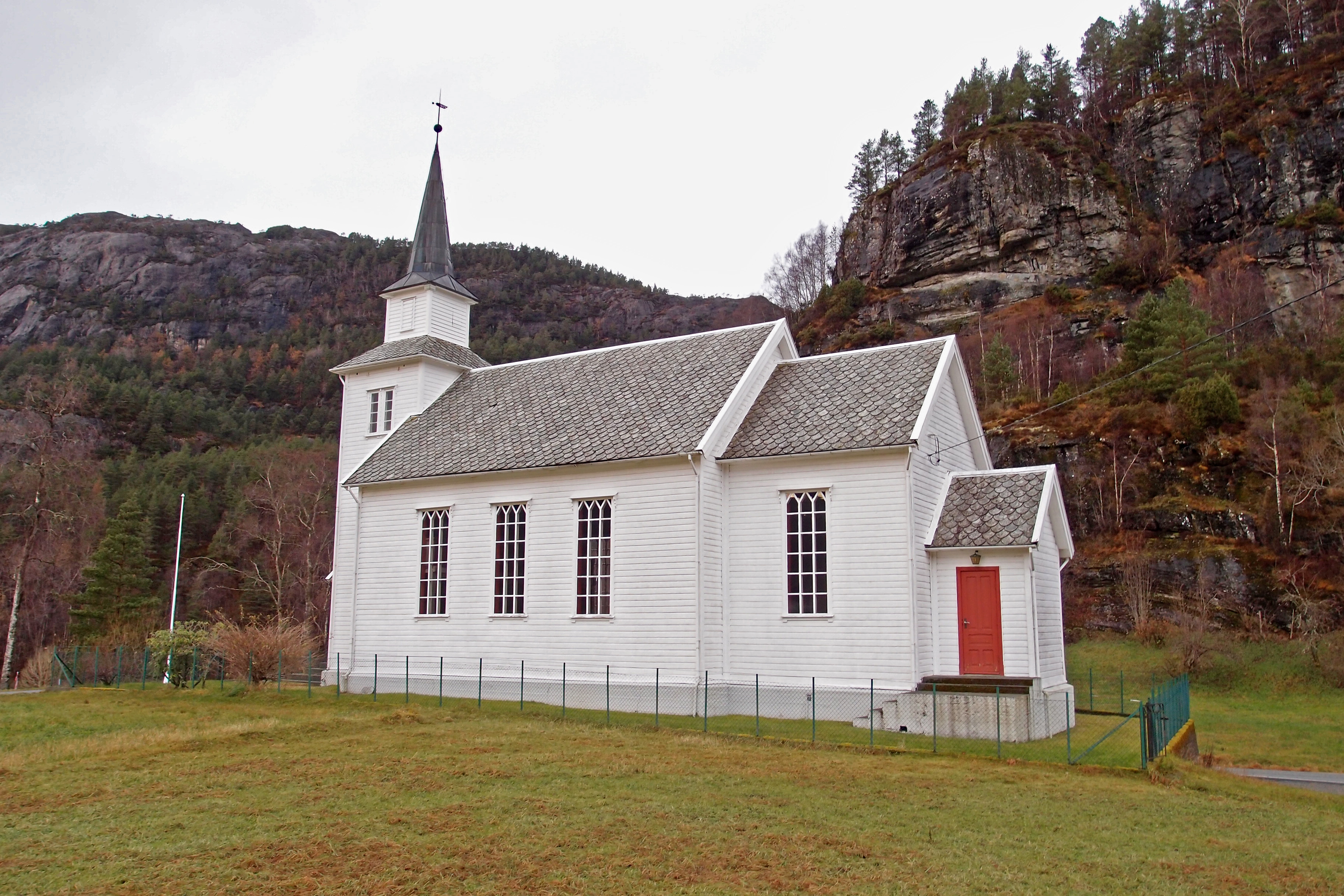

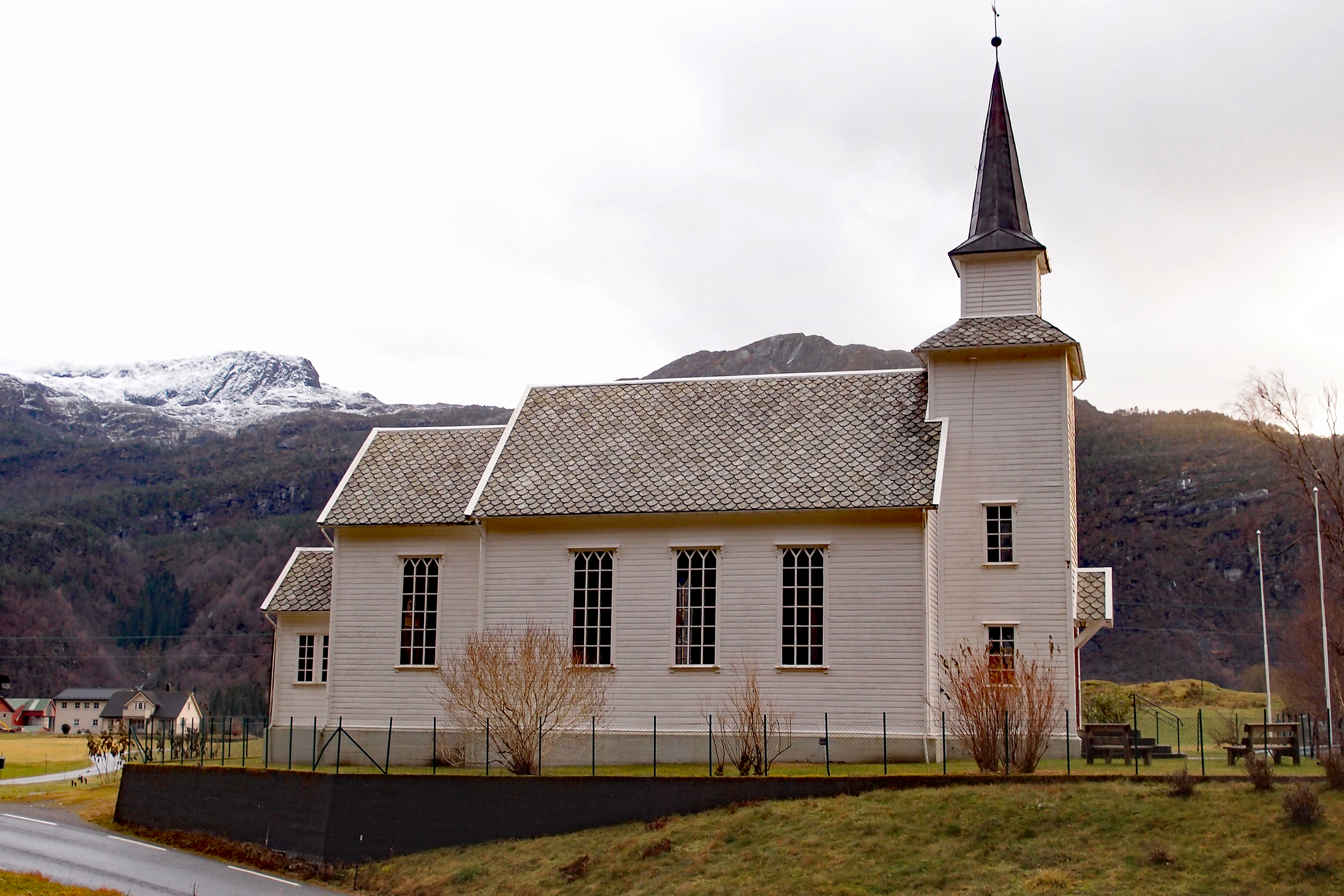

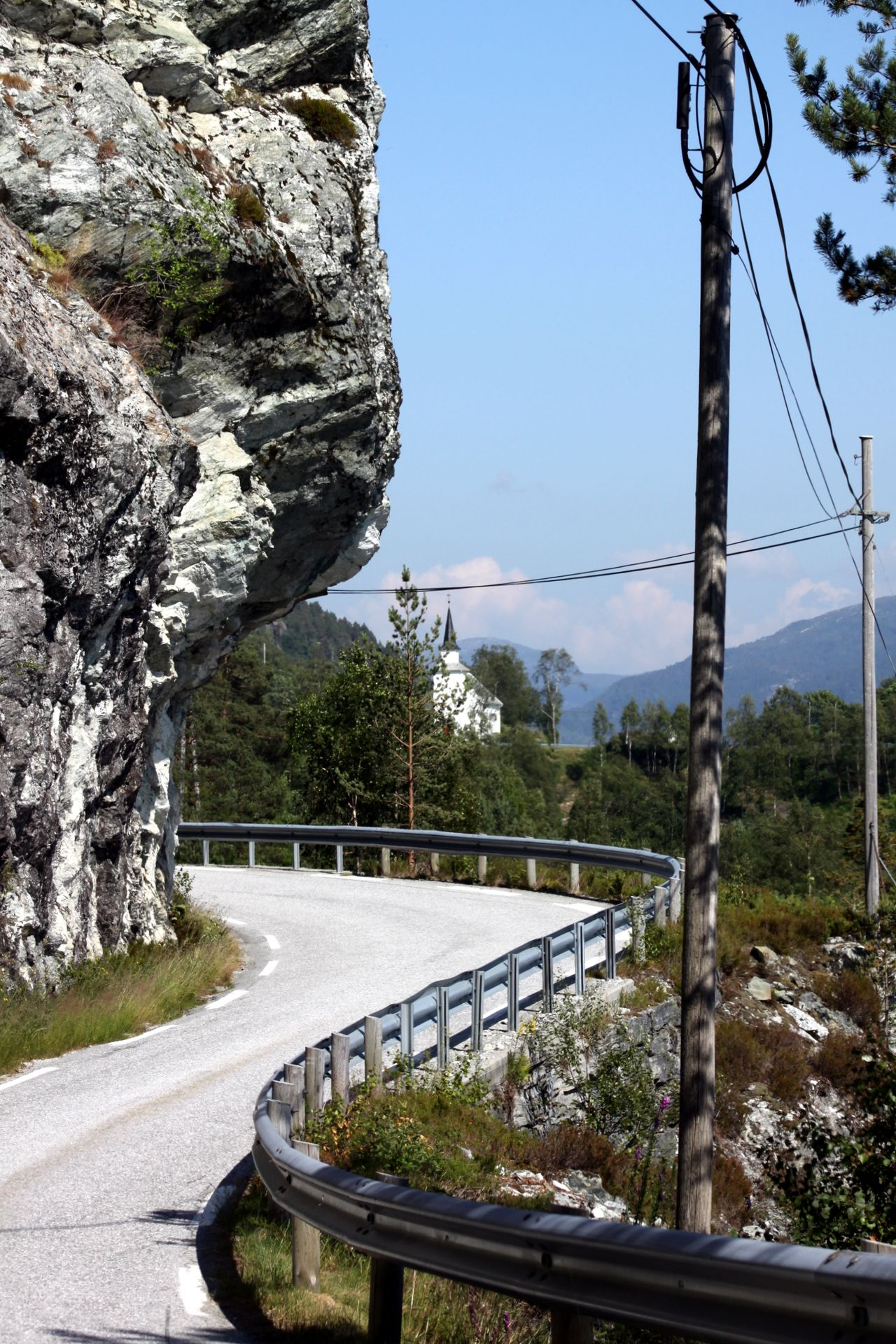

== See also ==
- List of churches in Bjørgvin
