= Norddalsfjord =

Village in Kinn Municipality, Norway

Norddalsfjord Norddal
- Village
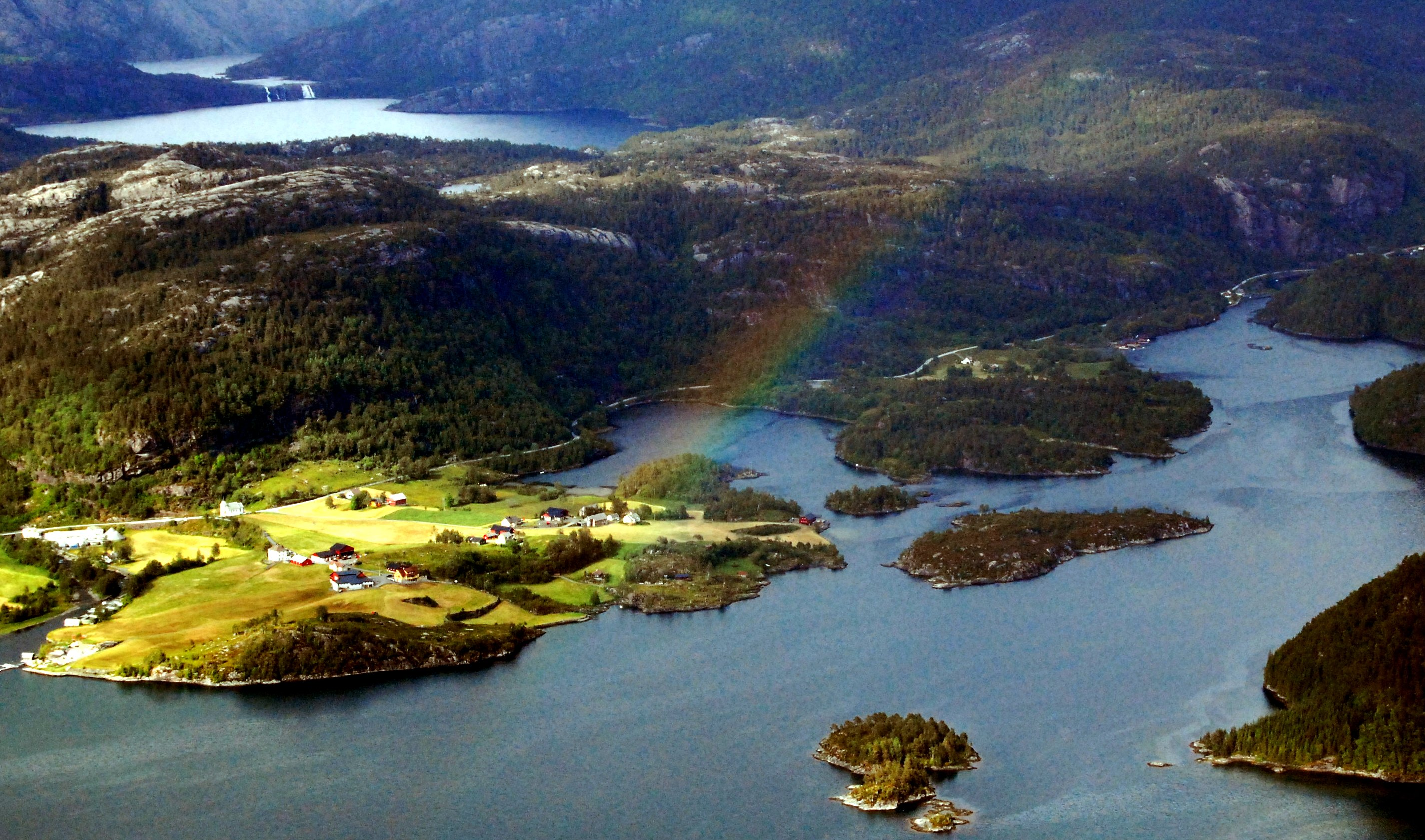
- View of the village along the fjord
- Interactive map of Norddalsfjord
- Location within Vestland Location within Norway
- Coordinates: 61.64303°N 5.37797°E
- Country: Norway
- Region: Western Norway
- County: Vestland
- District: Sunnfjord
- Municipality: Kinn Municipality
- Elevation: 17 m (56 ft)
- Time zone: UTC+01:00 (CET)
  - Summer (DST): UTC+02:00 (CEST)
- Post Code: 6900 Florø

Norddalsfjord or Norddal is a village in Kinn Municipality in Vestland county, Norway. The village lies along the Norddalsfjorden at the entrance to the Solheimsdalen valley. It sits at the mouth of the Norddalselva river on a small peninsula that sticks out into the fjord. The village lies along Norwegian County Road 544 about 25 kilometres (16 mi) east of the town of Florø, and about 4 kilometres (2.5 mi) northeast of the Norddalsfjord Bridge. Nordal Church is located in the small village.
