= Røssesund Bridge =

Bridge in Vestfold, Norway

Røssesund Bridge Røssesundbrua
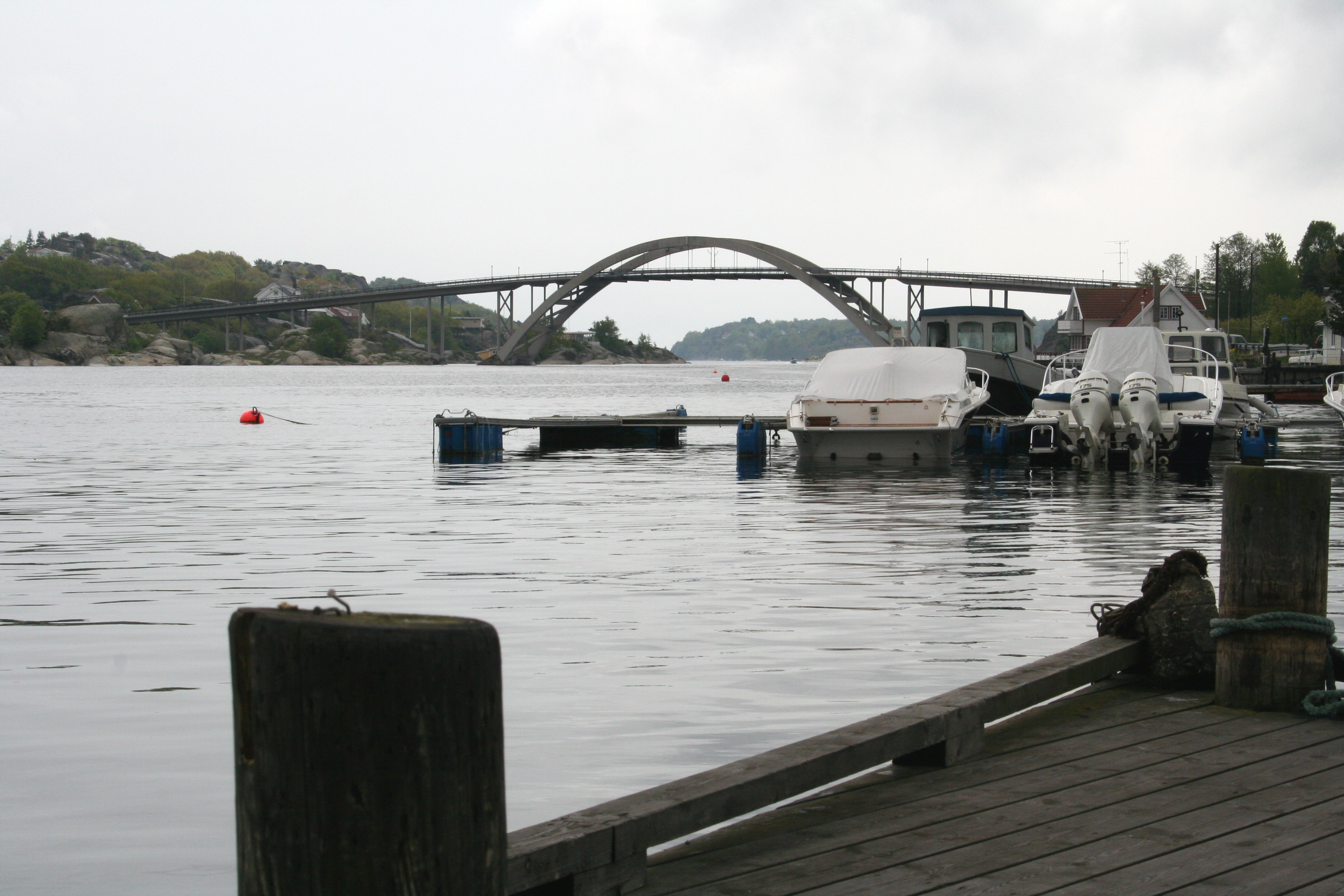
- View of the bridge
- Coordinates: 59.1022°N 10.4197°E
- Locale: Færder Municipality, Norway

Characteristics
- Material: Concrete
- Total length: 246.5 metres (809 ft)
- Height: 14 metres (46 ft)
- Longest span: 76 metres (249 ft)

History
- Construction end: 1952

Location
- Interactive map of Røssesund Bridge

Røssesund Bridge (Norwegian: Røssesundbrua or Røssesund bro) is a bridge over the Røssesund strait between the islands of Tjøme and Brøtsø in Færder Municipality in Vestfold county, Norway. The bridge is the only connection from Hvasser and Brøtsø to the mainland. The bridge is 246.5 metres (809 ft) long and 14 metres (46 ft) high. The bridge was completed in 1952. It was financed by toll payments from traffic over the Vrengen Bridge.

== See also ==
- List of bridges in Norway
