= Brandsøy =

Village in Kinn Municipality, Norway

- Village
- Interactive map of Brandsøy
- Location within Vestland Location within Norway
- Coordinates: 61.60272°N 5.13628°E
- Country: Norway
- Region: Western Norway
- County: Vestland
- District: Sunnfjord
- Municipality: Kinn Municipality

Area
  - Total: 0.52 km^{2} (0.20 sq mi)
- Elevation: 10 m (33 ft)

Population (2024)
  - Total: 734
  - Density: 1,412/km^{2} (3,660/sq mi)
- Time zone: UTC+01:00 (CET)
  - Summer (DST): UTC+02:00 (CEST)
- Post Code: 6900 Florø

Brandsøy is a village in Kinn Municipality in Vestland county, Norway. It is located on both sides of small strait that separates the east end of the island of Brandsøya and the mainland. The village sits along the Norwegian National Road 5 highway, about 5 kilometres (3.1 mi) east of the town of Florø and about 10 kilometres (6.2 mi) west of the village of Grov.

The 0.52-square-kilometre (130-acre) village has a population (2024) of 734 and a population density of 1,412 inhabitants per square kilometre (3,660/sq mi).
