= Norddalsfjord Bridge =

Norddalsfjord Bridge Norddalsfjordbrua
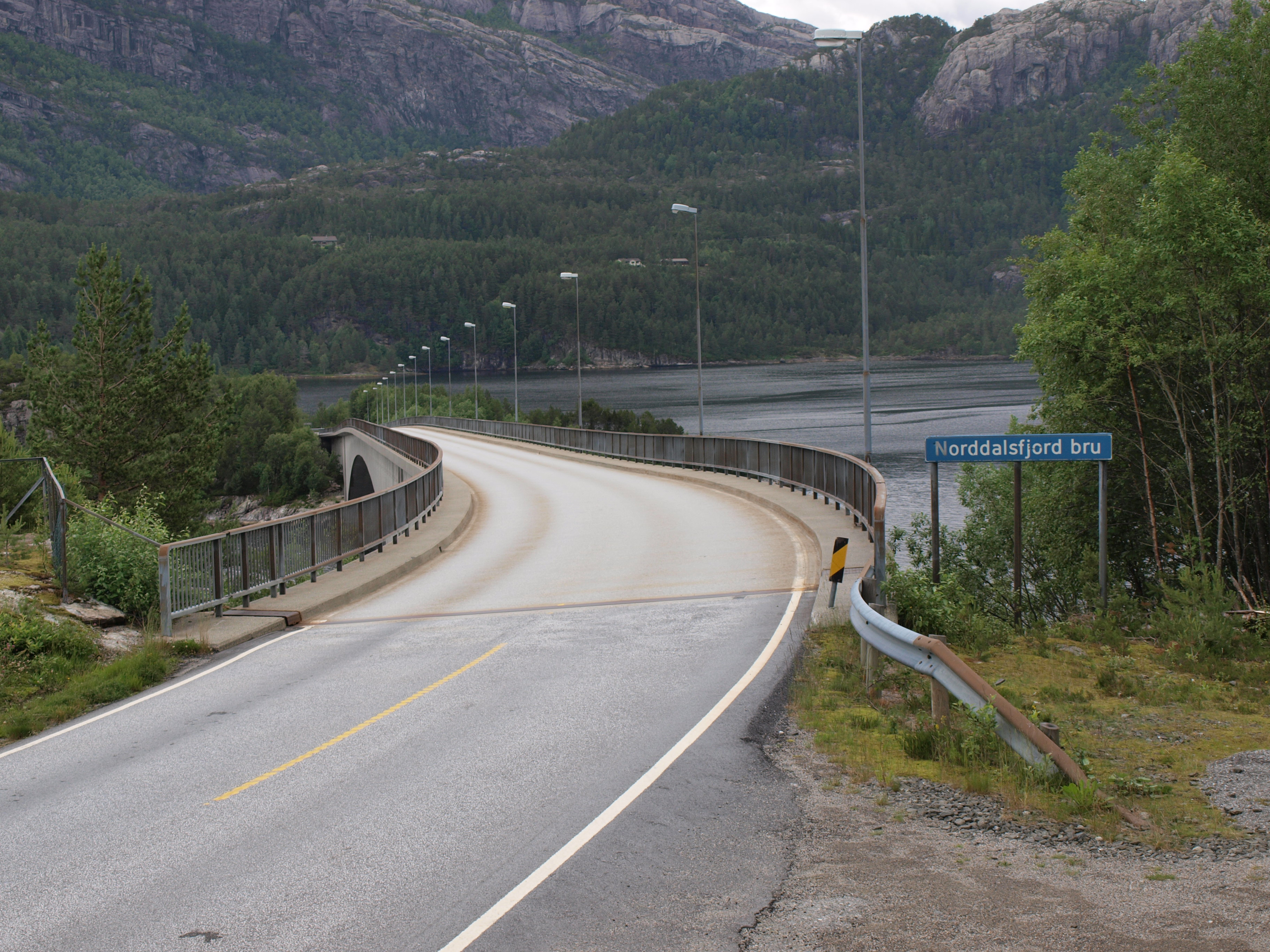
- View of the bridge
- Coordinates: 61°37′59″N 5°20′04″E
- Carries: Fv614
- Crosses: Norddalsfjorden
- Locale: Kinn Municipality

Characteristics
- Design: Cantilever bridge
- Total length: 401 m (1,316 ft)
- Longest span: 230 m (750 ft)

History
- Construction cost: 24.6 million kr
- Opened: 1987

Norddalsfjord Bridge (Norwegian: Norddalsfjordbrua) is a cantilever bridge that crosses the Norddalsfjorden in Kinn Municipality in Vestland county, Norway. It is the only road (non-ferry) that connects Bremanger Municipality to the rest of the mainland. The bridge is 401 metres (1,316 ft) long, and the longest span is 230 metres (750 ft). The bridge was opened in 1987. It is located about 15 kilometres (9.3 mi) east of the town of Florø, 2.5 kilometres (1.6 mi) north of the village of Grov, and about 3 kilometres (1.9 mi) west of the village of Norddalsfjord.

== See also ==
- List of bridges in Norway
- List of bridges in Norway by length
- List of bridges
- List of bridges by length
