= Sundøy Bridge =

Bridge in Leirfjord Municipality, Norway

Sundøy Bridge Sundøybrua
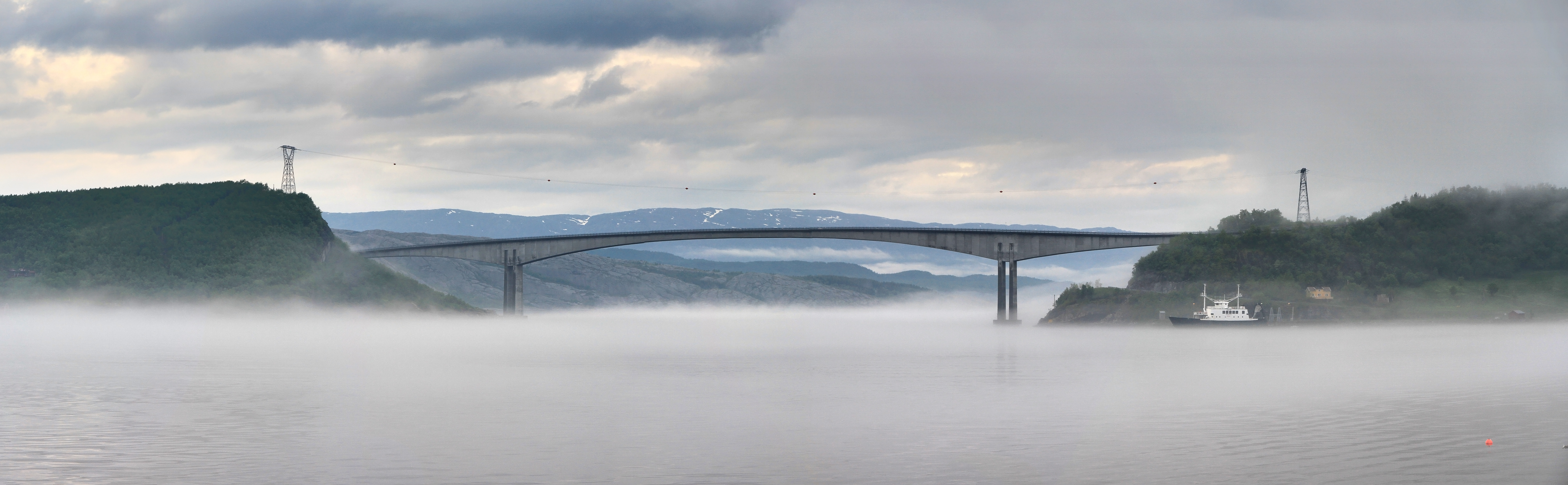
- View of the bridge
- Coordinates: 66°01′17″N 12°56′00″E
- Carries: 2 lanes of Fv220
- Locale: Leirfjord Municipality

Characteristics
- Design: Cantilever bridge
- Material: Concrete
- Total length: 538 metres (1,765 ft)
- Width: 10.3 metres (34 ft)
- Longest span: 298 metres (978 ft)
- No. of spans: 3
- Clearance below: 43.5 metres (143 ft)

History
- Construction start: 2001
- Construction end: 2003
- Construction cost: 150 million kr (US$22.4 million)
- Opened: 9 August 2003

Location
- Interactive map of Sundøy Bridge

The Sundøy Bridge (Norwegian: Sundøybrua) is a cantilever bridge in Leirfjord Municipality in Nordland county, Norway. The concrete bridge connects the mainland to the village of Sundøya on the island of Alsta. The 538-metre (1,765 ft) bridge has three spans, with the main span being 298 metres (978 ft) long. The maximum clearance to the sea is 43.5 metres (143 ft).

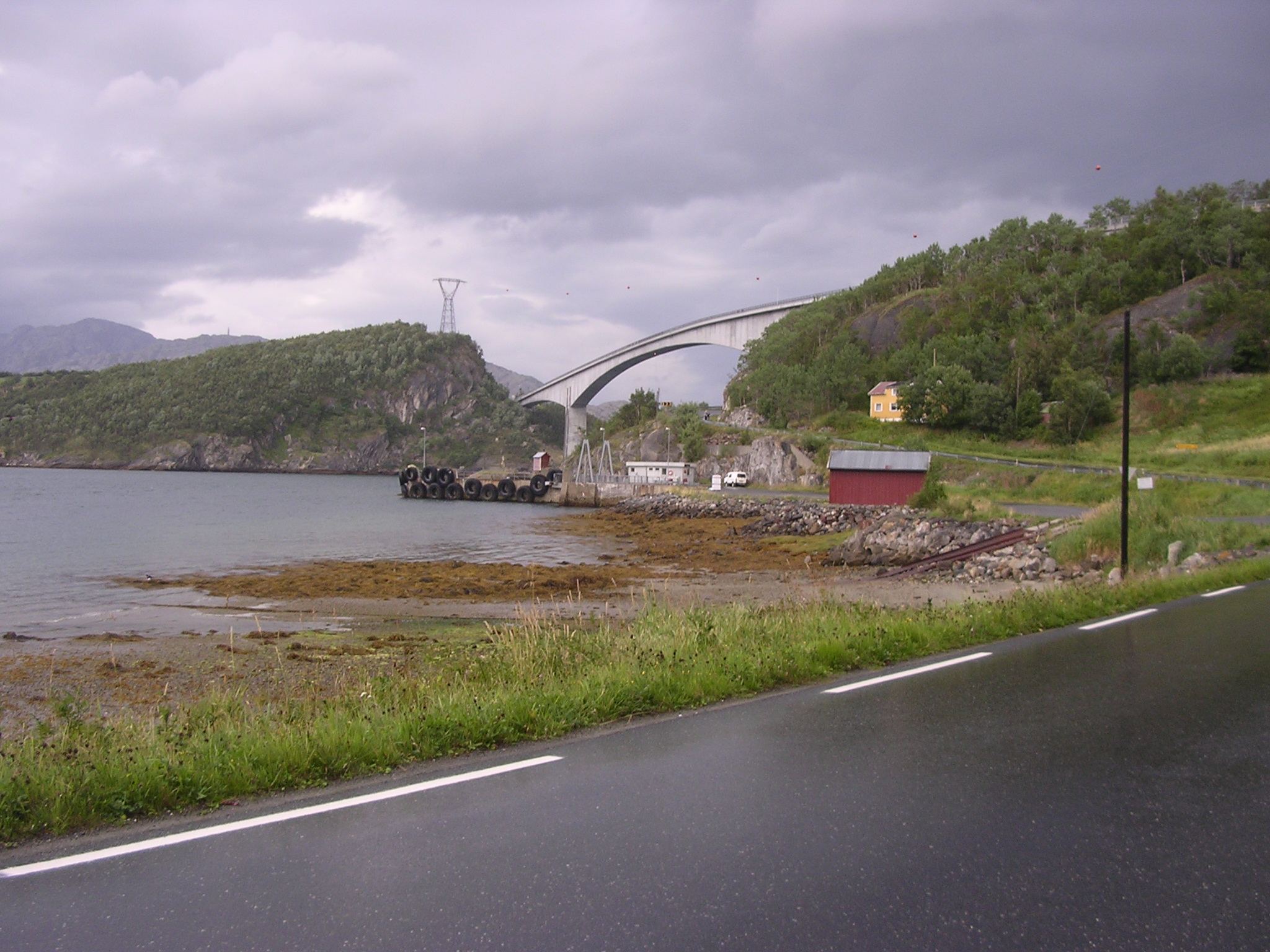
The bridge seen from the mainland, the old ferrylanding in the foreground

The Sundøy Bridge was opened on 9 August 2003. It was designed by Jan-Eirik Nilsskog. The bridge cost 150 million kr. The decision to spend such an amount of money on a bridge to a place with less than 150 inhabitants was disputed. However, Sundøya did not get connected to the mainland when the rest of Alsta did, following the opening of the Helgeland Bridge in 1991. This was because Seven Sisters mountains separate the two sides of the island with no roads crossing them. Consequently, the people at Sundøya thought it was only fair that they got their connection as well.

== See also ==
- List of bridges in Norway
- List of bridges in Norway by length
- List of bridges
- List of bridges by length
