= Folda Bridge =

Folda Bridge Foldabrua
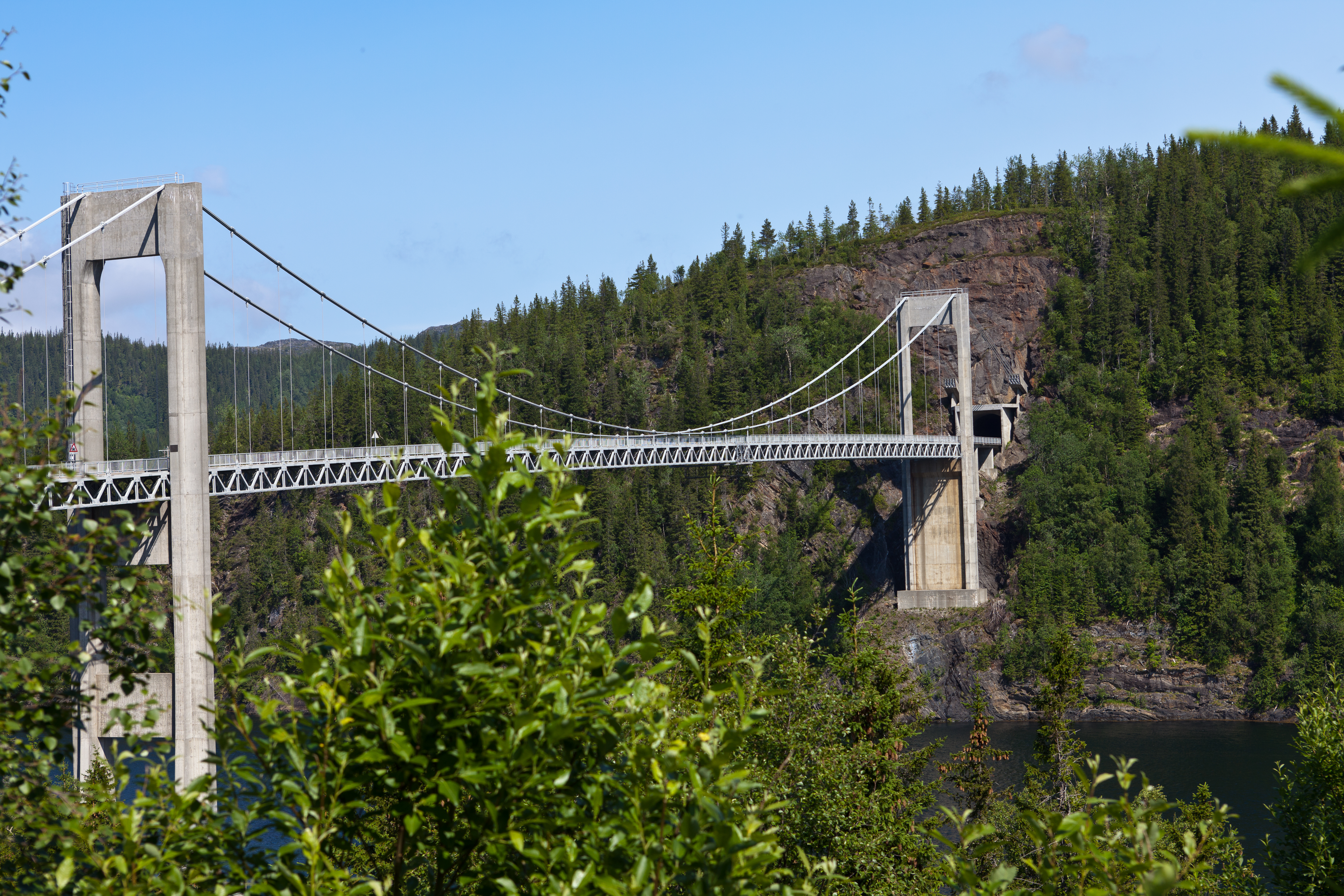
- Coordinates: 64°57′17″N 12°11′05″E
- Carries: Fv17
- Crosses: Foldafjord
- Locale: Nærøysund Municipality, Norway

Characteristics
- Total length: 336 metres (1,102 ft)
- Longest span: 225 metres (738 ft)
- Clearance below: 38 metres (125 ft)

The Folda Bridge (Norwegian: Foldabrua) is a suspension bridge in Nærøysund Municipality in Trøndelag county, Norway. The bridge crosses the Foldereidsundet strait which is part of the inner-Foldafjord. The bridge is 336 metres (1,102 ft) long, the main span is 225 metres (738 ft), and the maximum clearance below the bridge 38 metres (125 ft). At the northern end of the bridge, the road enters a 230-metre (750 ft) long tunnel through a mountain before entering the village of Foldereid. The bridge was completed in 1969.
