= Stolma Bridge =

Stolma Bridge Stolmabrua
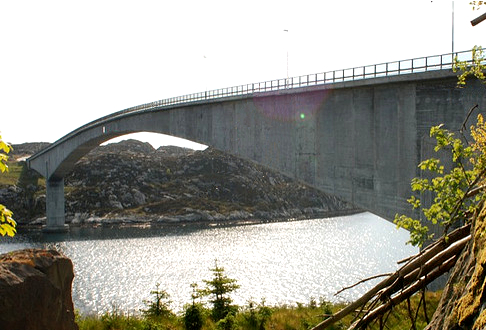
- View of the bridge
- Coordinates: 59.9965°N 5.1032°E
- Carries: Fv5138
- Crosses: Stolmasundet
- Locale: Austevoll Municipality
- Owner: Statens vegvesen

Characteristics
- Design: Cantilever box-girder
- Material: Steel and concrete
- Total length: 467 metres (1,532 ft)
- Width: 9 metres (30 ft)
- Longest span: 301 metres (988 ft)
- No. of spans: 3
- Clearance above: 30 metres (98 ft)

History
- Construction end: 1998
- Opened: 14 Nov 1998

Location
- Interactive map of Stolma Bridge

The Stolma Bridge (Norwegian: Stolmabrua) is a road bridge over the Stolmasundet strait in Austevoll Municipality in Vestland county, Norway. It connects the islands of Stolmen and Selbjørn. The bridge is 467 metres (1,532 ft) long and has three spans, the largest of which is 301 metres (988 ft). The construction cost was US$15.3 million. The bridge was opened for traffic 14 November 1998 and is part of County Road 5138. The main span was the world's longest cantilever box-girder span until it was surpassed by the Shibanpo Second Yangtze River Bridge in China.

== Bridge design ==
The bridge is a cantilevered prestressed concrete box girder bridge using low density concrete, with a vertical clearance of 30 metres (98 ft). To achieve its record length for box girder construction, the hollow concrete box girders are 7 metres (23 ft) wide and taper from 15 metres (49 ft) inbox beam depth over the piers to 3.5 metres (11 ft) in the center of the span. To reduce its weight, the center of the main span is constructed of high-strength low-density concrete with a density of 1,940 kilograms per cubic metre (3,270 pounds per cubic yard). The short end spans which cantilever the main span are ballasted with gravel.

== See also ==
- List of longest cantilever bridges
- List of bridges in Norway
