= Efjord Bridges =

Efjord Bridges Efjordbruene
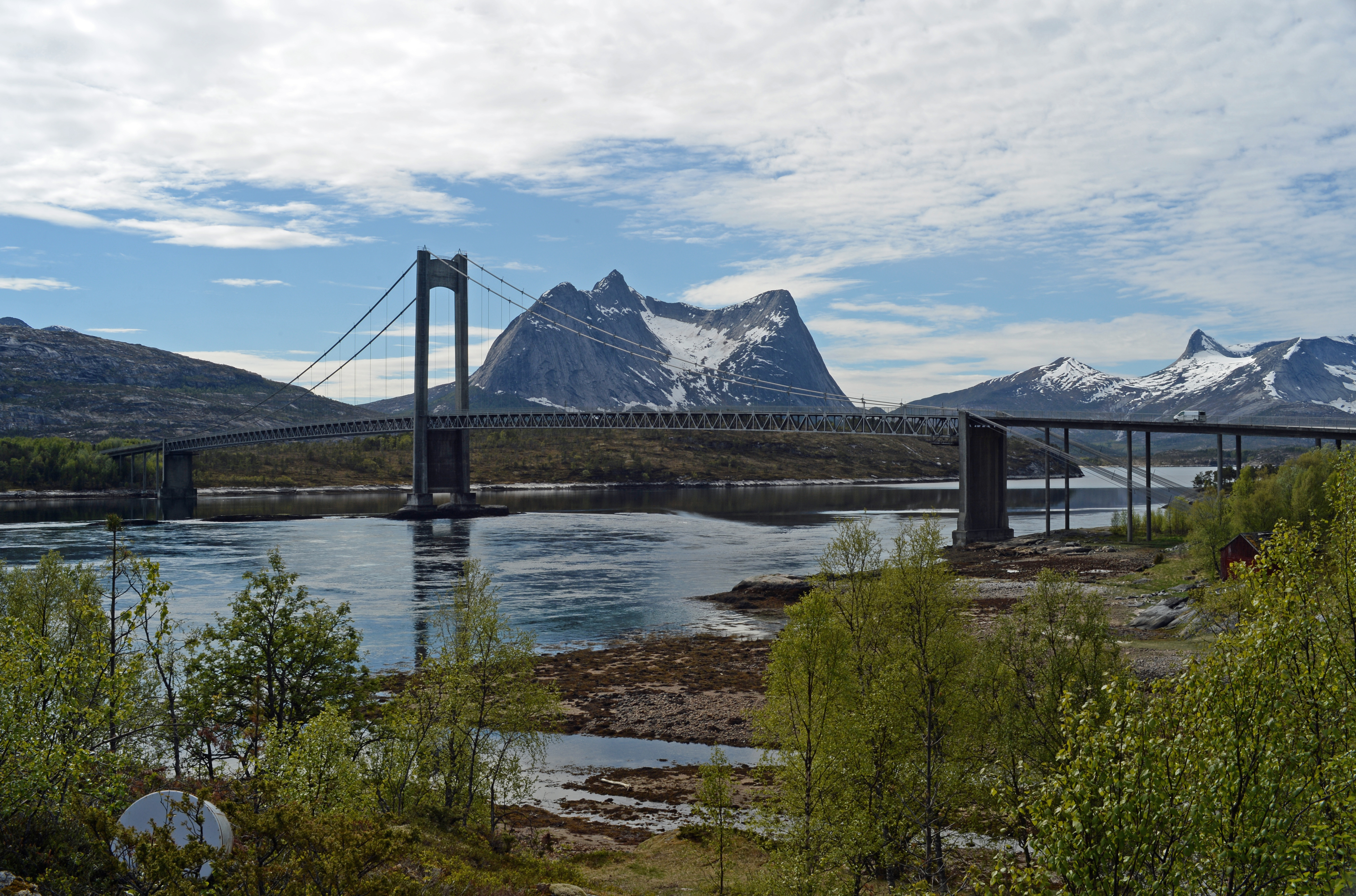
- View of the Kjerringstraumen Bridge
- Coordinates: 68°17′36″N 16°29′13″E
- Carries: E6
- Crosses: Efjorden
- Locale: Narvik Municipality, Norway

The Efjord Bridges (Norwegian: Efjordbruene) are a series of three bridges that cross the 1.7-kilometre (1.1 mi) wide Efjorden in Narvik Municipality in Nordland county, Norway. The bridges are a part of the European route E6 highway and they were opened in 1969. The three bridges connect the mainland sides of the fjord via two small islands in the fjord. The easternmost bridge is the Kjerringstraumen Bridge, then comes the Mellastraumen Bridge, and finally the Sørstraumen Bridge.

- The Kjerringstraumen Bridge (Norwegian: Kjerringstraumen bru) is a suspension bridge. It is 551 metres (1,808 ft) long, the main span is 200 metres (660 ft), and the maximum clearance to the sea is 18 metres (59 ft). The bridge has 15 spans. This bridge connects the mainland on the east side of the fjord to the island of Storøya. It's the longest of the three bridges.
- The Mellastraumen Bridge (Norwegian: Mellastraumen bru) is 143 metres (469 ft) long. The maximum clearance to the sea is 15 metres (49 ft). This small bridge connects the islands of Storøya and Halvardøya. This is the smallest of the bridges.
- The Sørstraumen Bridge (Norwegian: Sørstraumen bru) is 162 metres (531 ft) long. The maximum clearance to the sea is 2 metres (6 ft 7 in). This bridge connects the tiny island of Halvardøya to the mainland on the western side of the fjord. (This bridge should not be confused with the Sørstraumen Bridge in Troms.)
