= Sundøya =

Village in Leirfjord Municipality, Norway

Sundøya Sundøy
- Village
- Interactive map of Sundøya
- Location within Nordland Location within Norway
- Coordinates: 65.9920°N 12.8586°E
- Country: Norway
- Region: Northern Norway
- County: Nordland
- District: Helgeland
- Municipality: Leirfjord Municipality
- Elevation: 62 m (203 ft)
- Time zone: UTC+01:00 (CET)
  - Summer (DST): UTC+02:00 (CEST)
- Post Code: 8890 Leirfjord

Sundøya is a village in Leirfjord Municipality in Nordland county, Norway. The village is located about 5 kilometres (3.1 mi) south of the village of Leland. Sundøya has a population of about 120 people. It is located on the north side of the Vefsnfjorden on the northeastern part of the island of Alsta, east of the Seven Sisters mountains, which isolate it from the rest of the island. Since Sundøy is surrounded by mountains and water, it was only accessible by boat until 2003 when the Sundøy Bridge was built, providing a road connection to the mainland of Leirfjord Municipality.
