= Helgeland Bridge =

Helgeland Bridge Helgelandsbrua
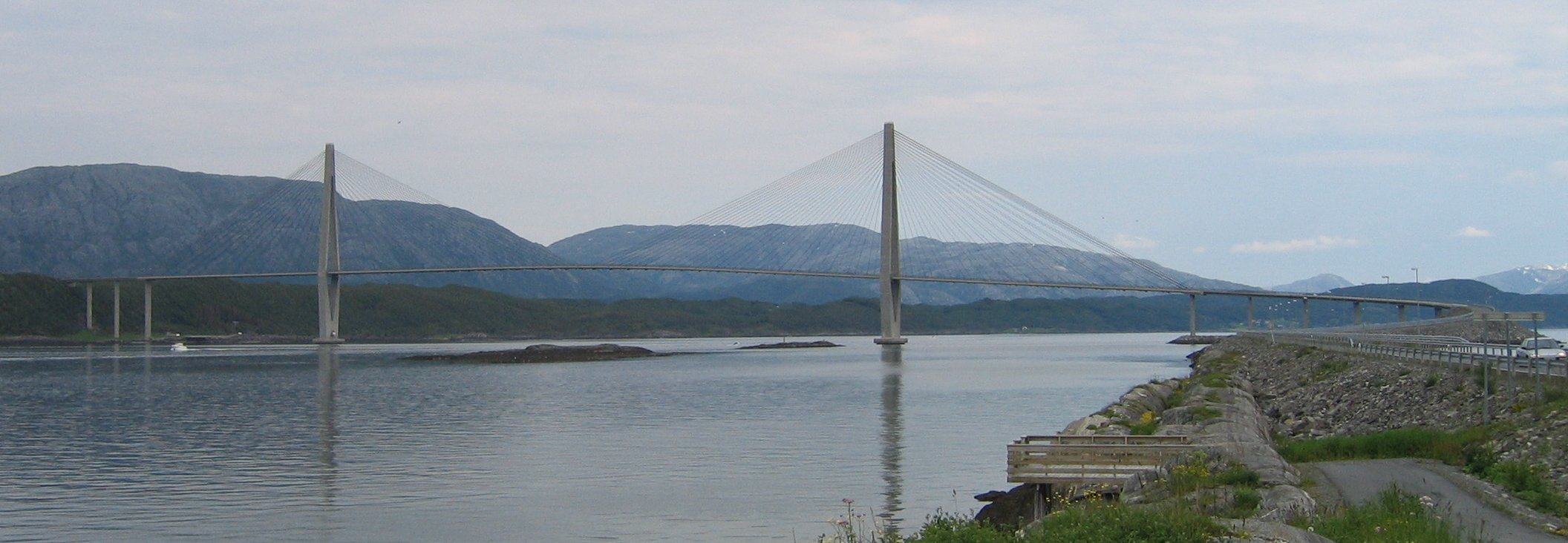
- View of the bridge (from south)
- Coordinates: 66°02′16″N 12°43′13″E
- Carries: Fv17
- Crosses: Leirfjorden
- Locale: Alstahaug Municipality and Leirfjord Municipality

Characteristics
- Design: Cable-stayed bridge
- Material: Concrete and Steel
- Total length: 1,065 metres (3,494 ft)
- Width: 12 metres (39 ft)
- Height: 138 metres (453 ft)
- Longest span: 425 metres (1,394 ft)
- No. of spans: 12
- Clearance below: 45 metres (148 ft)

History
- Construction start: 1989
- Construction end: 1991

Location
- Interactive map of Helgeland Bridge

The Helgeland Bridge (Norwegian: Helgelandsbrua) is a cable-stayed bridge that crosses the Leirfjorden between the mainland (in Leirfjord Municipality) and the island of Alsta (in Alstahaug Municipality) in Nordland county, Norway. The town of Sandnessjøen is located just southwest of the bridge on the island.

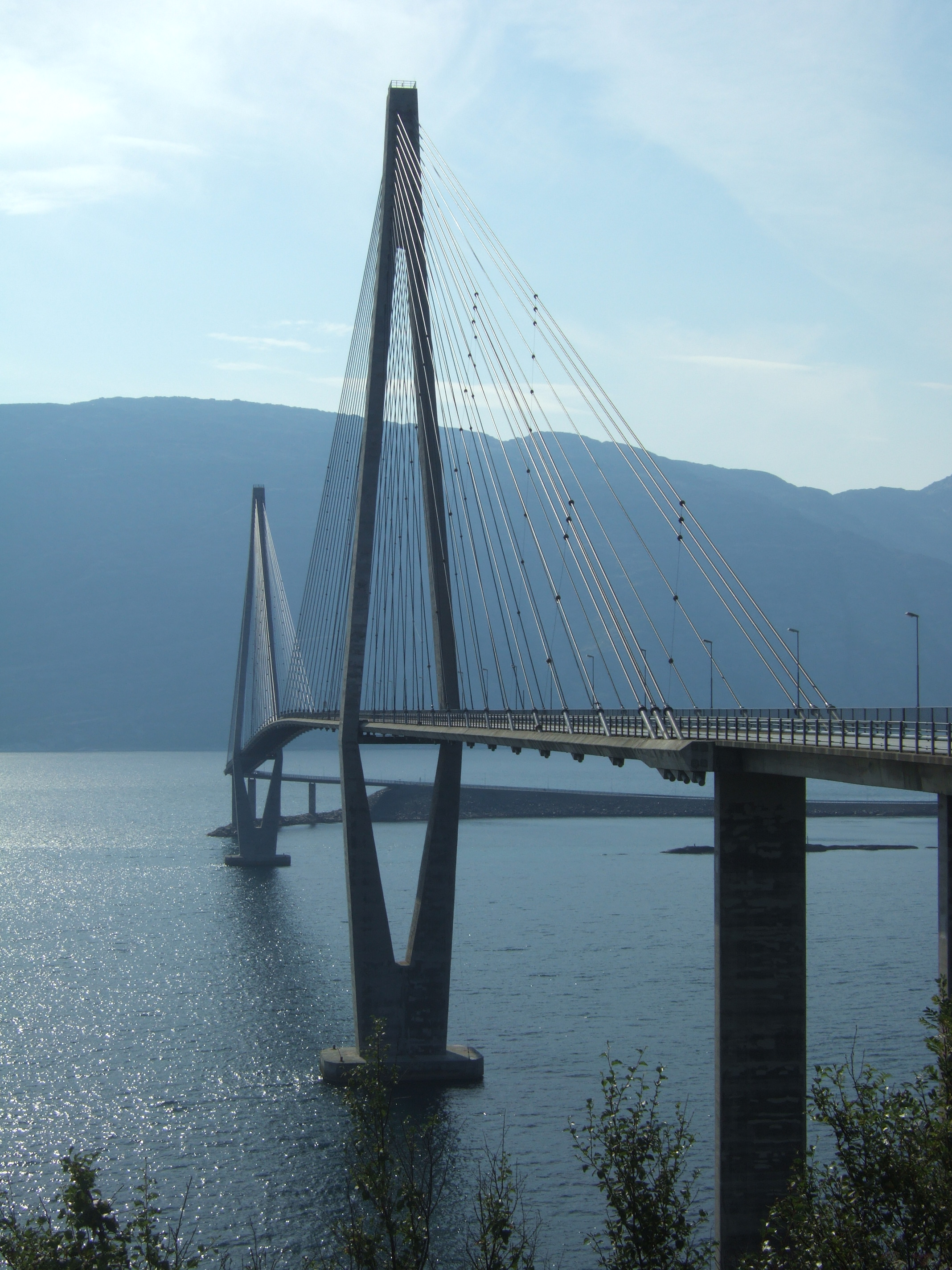
The Helgeland bridge connecting Alsta island to the mainland.

The Helgeland Bridge was designed by Holger Svensson. Construction began in 1989 and it was finished in 1991. The bridge officially opened in July 1991. The construction cost was 200 million kr. The bridge was a toll bridge until 23 June 2005.

The 1,065-metre-long (3,494 ft) bridge is made up of 12 spans, the longest of which is 425 metres (1,394 ft) long. The maximum clearance to the sea below the bridge is 45 metres (148 ft). The foundations extend to a depth of 31 metres (102 ft). The bridge is built out of pre-stressed and reinforced concrete and steel cables.
