= List of bridges in Norway by length =

This is a list of the bridges in Norway listed by their full length above water or land.

== Bridges ==
	Name	Length (metres)	Span (metres)	Completed	County
	Drammen Bridge	1,892	60	1975	Buskerud
	Nordhordland Bridge	1,614	172	1994	Hordaland
	Hålogaland Bridge	1,533	1,145	2018	Nordland
	Sannesund Bridge	1,528	139	1978	Østfold
	Mjøsa Bridge	1,421	69	1985	Hedmark/Oppland
	Hardanger Bridge	1,380	1310	2013	Hordaland
	Tresfjord Bridge	1,290	160	2015	Møre og Romsdal
	Gjemnessund Bridge	1,257	623	1992	Møre og Romsdal
	Sotra Bridge	1,236	468	1971	Hordaland
	Måløy Bridge	1,224	125	1973	Sogn og Fjordane
	Sandnessund Bridge	1,220	150	1973	Troms
	Gisund Bridge	1,147	143	1972	Troms
	Stord Bridge	1,077	677	2000	Hordaland
Stavanger City Bridge	Stavanger City Bridge	1,067	185	1978	Rogaland
	Helgeland Bridge	1,065	425	1991	Nordland
	Askøy Bridge	1,057	850	1992	Hordaland
	Tromsø Bridge	1,016	80	1960	Troms
	Hadsel Bridge	1,011	150	1978	Nordland
	Skarnsund Bridge	1,010	530	1991	Nord-Trøndelag
	Tjeldsund Bridge	1,007	290	1967	Troms
	Bømla Bridge	998	577	2001	Hordaland
Sortland Bridge	Sortland Bridge	948	150	1975	Nordland
	Bergsøysund Bridge	931	106	1992	Møre og Romsdal
	Osterøy Bridge	917	595	1997	Hordaland
Sykkylven Bridge	Sykkylven Bridge	860	60	2000	Møre og Romsdal
	Mjøsund Bridge	840	184.75	1994	Troms
	Gimsøystraumen Bridge	839	148	1981	Nordland
	Fredrikstad Bridge	824	196	1957	Østfold
	Skjervøy Bridge	804	32	1971	Troms
	Saltstraumen Bridge	768	160	1978	Nordland
	Rombak Bridge	765	325	1964	Nordland
	Andøy Bridge	750	110	1974	Nordland
	Kvalsund Bridge	741	525	1977	Finnmark
	Skjomen Bridge	711	525	1972	Nordland
Raftsund Bridge	Raftsund Bridge	711	298	1998	Nordland
	New Svinesund Bridge	704	247	2005	Østfold/Sweden
Nærøysund Bridge	Nærøysund Bridge	701	325	1981	Nord-Trøndelag
	Karmsund Bridge	691	150	1955	Rogaland
	West Bridge (in Kristiansand)	679	46	1980	Vest-Agder
	Brevik Bridge	677	272	1962	Telemark
	New Varodd Bridge	663	260	1994	Vest-Agder
Kjellingstraumen Bridge	Kjellingstraumen Bridge	662	260	1975	Nordland
Lysefjord Bridge	Lysefjord Bridge	640	446	1997	Rogaland
	Helland Bridge	624	68	2001	Vestfold
Hagelsund Bridge	Hagelsund Bridge	623	250	1982	Hordaland
	Old Varodd Bridge	618	337	1956	Vest-Agder
	Grenland Bridge	608	305	1996	Telemark
	Old Minnesund Bridge	598	102	1959	Akershus
	Marøysund Bridge	590	120	1978	Nord-Trøndelag
	Rongsund Bridge	584	163	1986	Hordaland
	Farrisbrua	570	331	2018	Vestfold
	Fedafjorden Bridge	566	331	2006	Vest-Agder
	Bolsøy Bridge	555	55	1991	Møre og Romsdal
Giske Bridge	Giske Bridge	552	52	1987	Møre og Romsdal
	Kjerringstraumen Bridge	551	200	1969	Nordland
Brønnøysund Bridge	Brønnøysund Bridge	550	110	1979	Nordland
	Imarsund Bridge	550	120	2007	Møre og Romsdal
	Engeløy Bridge (high bridge)	548	110	1978	Nordland
	Herøy Bridge	544	170	1976	Møre og Romsdal
Sundøy Bridge	Sundøy Bridge	538	298	2003	Nordland
	New Minnesund Bridge	532	90	1993	Akershus
Stokkøy Bridge	Stokkøy Bridge	525	206	2000	Sør-Trøndelag
	Sommarøy Bridge	522	120	?	Troms
	Aursund Bridge	486	?	1995	Møre og Romsdal
	Stolma Bridge	467	301	1998	Hordaland
	Vrengen Bridge	465	171	1981	Vestfold
	New Puddefjord Bridge	461	150	1999	Hordaland
	Hundvåkøy Bridge	460	233	2007	Hordaland
	Sørstraumen Bridge	440	120	1979	Troms
	Storholmen Bridge	439	172	2007	Hordaland
	Old Puddefjord Bridge	436	150	1956	Hordaland
	Lokkaren Bridge	435	225	1977	Nord-Trøndelag
	Nerlandsøy Bridge	430	?	1968	Møre og Romsdal
Runde Bridge	Runde Bridge	428	?	1982	Møre og Romsdal
Kvalsaukan Bridge	Kvalsaukan Bridge	425	?	1975	Nordland
	Old Svinesund Bridge	420	?	1946	Østfold/Sweden
Støvset Bridge	Støvset Bridge	420	220	1993	Nordland
	Ognasund Bridge	420	?	1991	Rogaland
	Straumsund Bridge	412	146	1991	Møre og Romsdal
	Sørsund Bridge	408	100	1963	Møre og Romsdal
	Eiksund Bridge	405	132	2005	Møre og Romsdal
	Norddalsfjord Bridge	401	230	1987	Sogn og Fjordane
	Tromøy Bridge	400	240	1961	Aust-Agder
	Vassås Bridge	400	160	1980	Nordland
	Melhus Bridge	400	?	2003	Sør-Trøndelag

== Bridges under consideration ==
- Hordfast, around 5 km, in Hordaland
- Sognefjord Bridge, around 4 km, in Sogn og Fjordane
- Nordfjord Bridge, around 1.8 km, in Sogn og Fjordane
- Sulafjord Bridge, around 4 km, in Møre og Romsdal
- Julsund Bridge, around 2.0 km, in Møre og Romsdal
- Halsafjord Bridge, around 2.5 km, in Møre og Romsdal
- New Mjøsa Bridge, around 1.5 km, in Hedmark and Oppland
- Tysfjord Bridge, around 3 km, in Nordland
