= Naustdal Municipality =

Former municipality in Sogn og Fjordane, Norway

Naustdal Municipality Naustdal kommune
- Former municipality
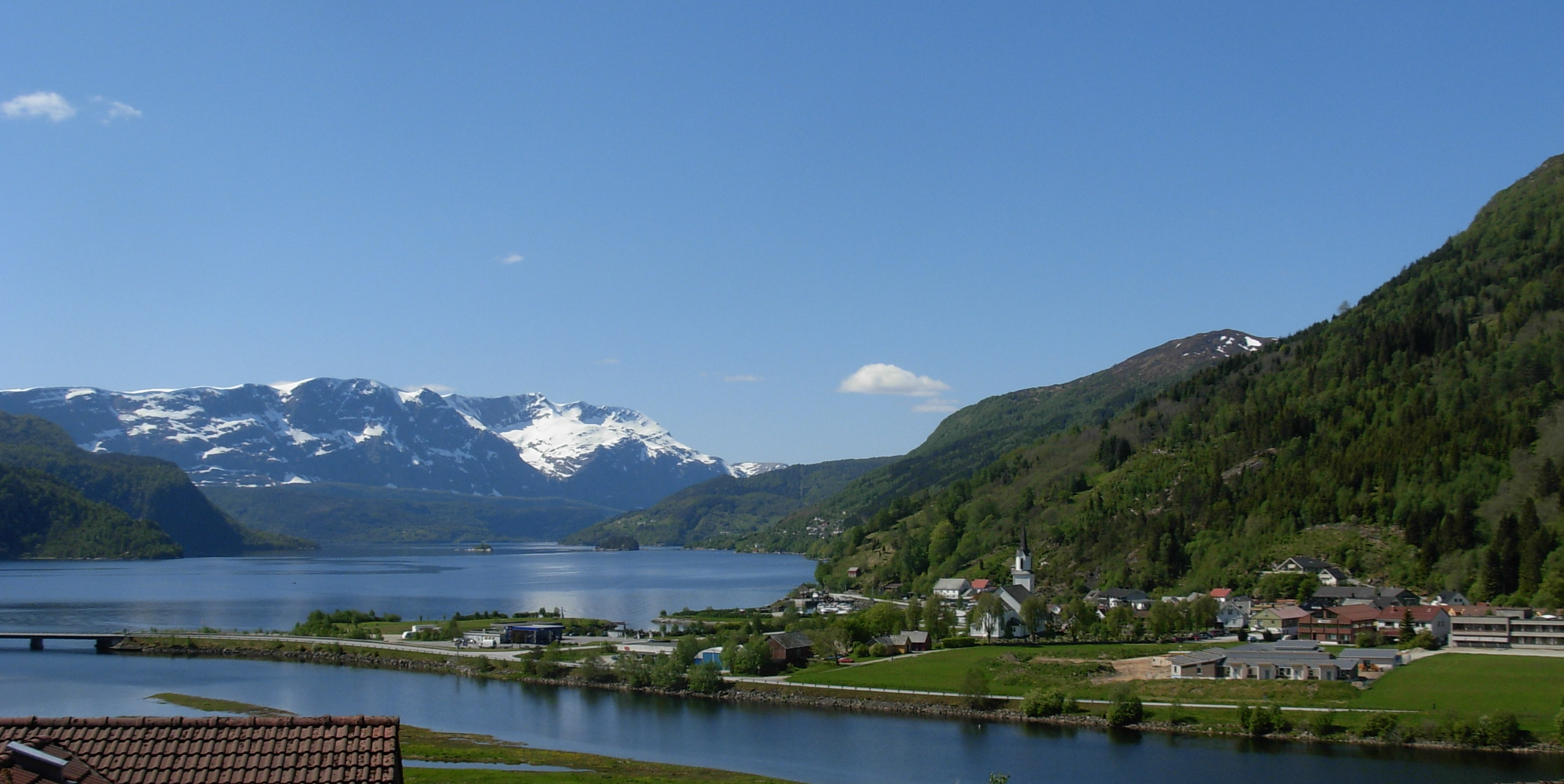
- View of the village of Naustdal

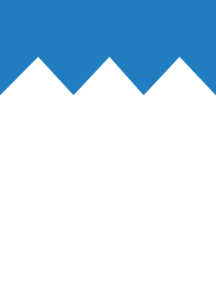
- Flag Coat of arms

- Sogn og Fjordane within Norway

- Naustdal within Sogn og Fjordane
- Coordinates: 61°33′38″N 05°51′19″E
- Country: Norway
- County: Sogn og Fjordane
- District: Sunnfjord
- Established: 1 Jan 1896
  - Preceded by: Førde Municipality
- Disestablished: 1 Jan 2020
  - Succeeded by: Sunnfjord Municipality
- Administrative centre: Naustdal

Government
  - Mayor (2007–2019): Håkon Myrvang (Ap)

Area (upon dissolution)
  - Total: 369.49 km^{2} (142.66 sq mi)
  - Land: 355.51 km^{2} (137.26 sq mi)
  - Water: 13.98 km^{2} (5.40 sq mi) 3.8%
  - Rank: #251 in Norway
- Highest elevation: 1,390.4 m (4,562 ft)

Population (2019)
  - Total: 2,793
  - Rank: #277 in Norway
  - Density: 7.6/km^{2} (20/sq mi)
  - Change (10 years): ▲ +5.2%
- Demonym(s): Naustedøling; Naustedøl

Official language
  - Norwegian form: Nynorsk
- Time zone: UTC+01:00 (CET)
  - Summer (DST): UTC+02:00 (CEST)
- ISO 3166 code: NO-1433

Naustdal is a former municipality in the old Sogn og Fjordane county, Norway. The 369.5-square-kilometre (142.7 sq mi) municipality existed from 1896 until its dissolution in 2020. The area is now part of Sunnfjord Municipality in the traditional district of Sunnfjord in Vestland county. The administrative centre was the village of Naustdal. Other villages in the municipality included Vevring and Helle.

Prior to its dissolution in 2020, the 369.49-square-kilometre (142.66 sq mi) municipality was the 251th largest by area out of the 422 municipalities in Norway. Naustdal Municipality was the 277th most populous municipality in Norway with a population of about 2,793. The municipality's population density was 7.6 inhabitants per square kilometre (20/sq mi) and its population had increased by 5.2% over the previous 10-year period.

Naustdal was situated between the towns of Førde and Florø, along the Norwegian National Road 5 highway. The Naustdal Tunnel ran through the mountains to connect to the town of Florø. Førde Airport (in Bringeland, Gaular Municipality) was the closest regional airport, and it was about 30 kilometres (19 mi) from Naustdal.

Naustdal Municipality was a farming community with diversity and cultural activities ranging from annual art exhibitions at Vevring to fairs, music, and dancing. Several renowned artists and writers come from Naustdal. Some of the local farmers breed horses, and horse shows are held every second year. Athletes from Naustdal do very well both in national and international championships, especially in volleyball and weightlifting. Naustdal offers rich opportunities for outdoor life such as fishing on the fjord from hired boats. The famous salmon river, Nausta, is in one of the county's largest wilderness areas with mountains, streams, lakes, and mountain farms, and it attracts many tourists from around the world. A recreational area and marina have recently been laid out near the center of Naustdal.

== General information ==
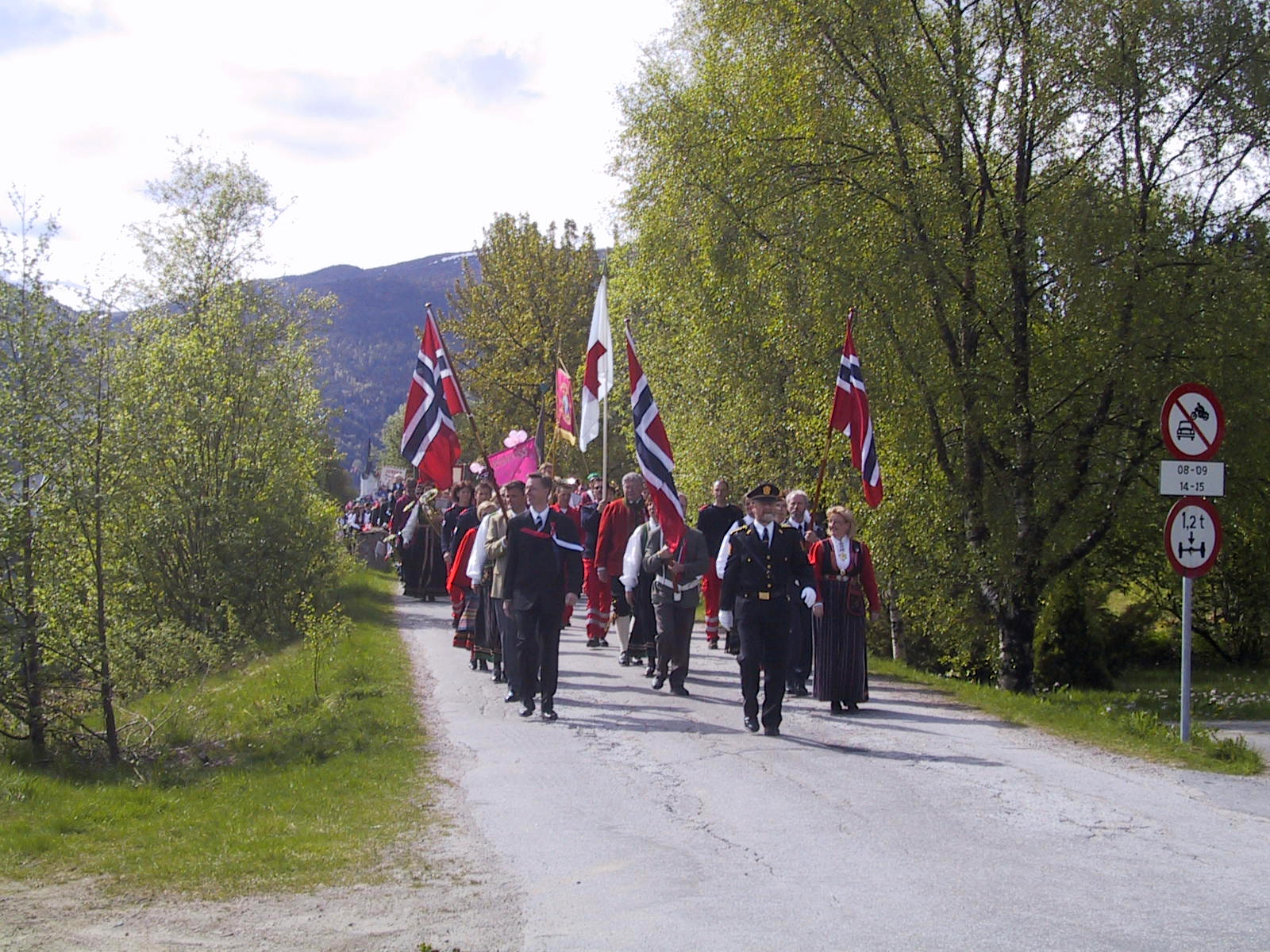
17th of May celebration

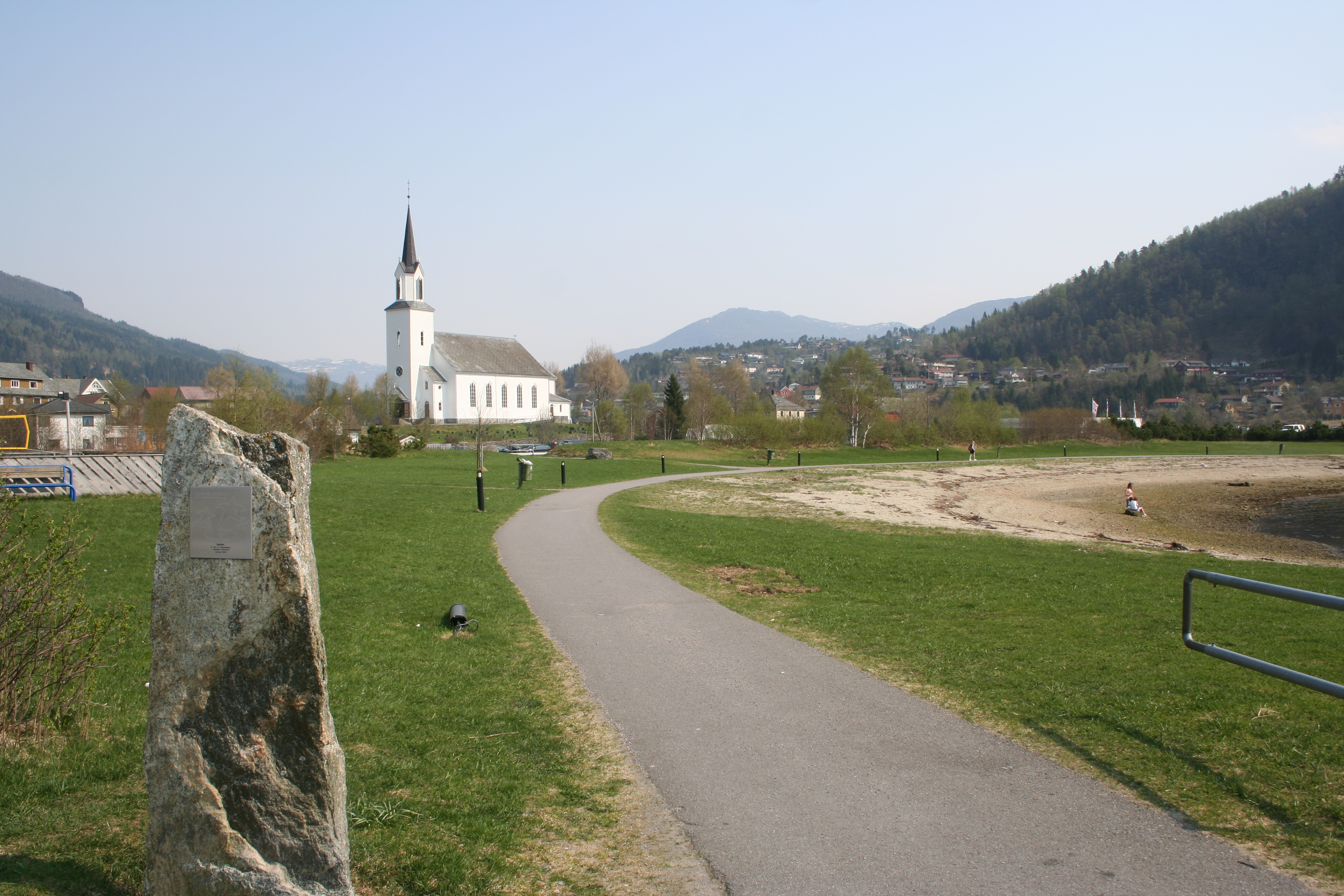
The beach next to the Naustdal Church

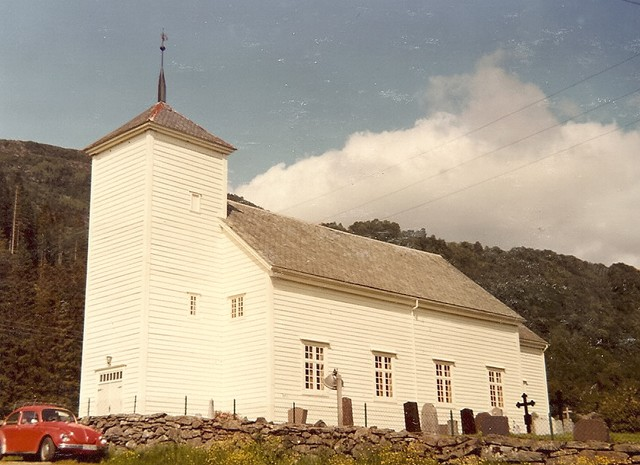
Vevring Church

The parish of Naustdal was established as a municipality on 1 January 1896 when the large Førde Municipality was divided. The northwestern part (population: 2,543) became the new Naustdal Municipality and the rest of the old municipality (population: 2,903) remained as Førde Municipality.

During the 1960s, there were many municipal mergers across Norway due to the work of the Schei Committee. On 1 January 1964, the areas of Naustdal Municipality that were located south of the Førdefjorden (population: 265) were transferred to Førde Municipality. On the same date, the parts of Vevring Municipality that were located north of the Førdefjorden (population: 439) was merged with the remaining parts (population: 1,633) of Naustdal Municipality.

On 1 January 2020, Jølster Municipality, Førde Municipality, Naustdal Municipality, and Gaular Municipality were merged to form the large, new Sunnfjord Municipality.

=== Name ===
The municipality (originally the parish) was named after the old Naustdal farm (Old Norse: Naustdalr) since the first Naustdal Church was built there. The first element is the name of the local river Nausta. The river name is identical with the word naust which means "boathouse". The last element is dalr which means "valley" or "dale".

=== Coat of arms ===
The coat of arms was granted on 11 December 1987 and it was in use until 1 January 2020 when the municipality was dissolved. The official blazon is "Argent, a chief dancetty azure" (Norwegian: På sølv grunn blått skjoldhovud laga med breitt tannsnitt). This means the arms are divided with a line that is dancetty which divides the chief from the rest of the shield in a ratio of 1:3. The field (background) above the line has a tincture of blue. Below the line, the field has a tincture of argent which means it is commonly colored white, but if it is made out of metal, then silver is used. The two colors are divided by a jagged line which symbolizes the profile of the gables of three boathouses. The arms are canting since the Norwegian word naust means "boathouse". The two colors symbolize the sky above and the silver/white represents the sea. The arms were designed by Inge Rotevatn. The municipal flag has the same design as the coat of arms.

=== Churches ===
The Church of Norway had two parishes (sokn) within Naustdal Municipality. It was part of the Sunnfjord prosti (deanery) in the Diocese of Bjørgvin.

Churches in Naustdal Municipality
Parish (sokn)	Church name	Location of the church	Year built
Naustdal	Naustdal Church	Naustdal	1891
Vevring	Vevring Church	Vevring	1846

== Government ==
While it existed, Naustdal Municipality was responsible for primary education (through 10th grade), outpatient health services, senior citizen services, welfare and other social services, zoning, economic development, and municipal roads and utilities. The municipality was governed by a municipal council of directly elected representatives. The mayor was indirectly elected by a vote of the municipal council. The municipality was under the jurisdiction of the Sogn og Fjordane District Court and the Gulating Court of Appeal.

=== Municipal council ===
The municipal council (Kommunestyre) of Naustdal Municipality was made up of 21 representatives that were elected to four year terms. The tables below show the historical composition of the council by political party.

Naustdal kommunestyre 2015–2019
Party name (in Nynorsk)	Number of representatives
Labour Party (Arbeidarpartiet)	9
Conservative Party (Høgre)	2
Christian Democratic Party (Kristeleg Folkeparti)	1
Centre Party (Senterpartiet)	4
Socialist Left Party (Sosialistisk Venstreparti)	4
Liberal Party (Venstre)	1
Total number of members:	21
Note: On 1 January 2020, Naustdal Municipality, Jølster Municipality, Førde Municipality, and Gaular Municipality were merged to form the new Sunnfjord Municipality.

Naustdal kommunestyre 2011–2015
Party name (in Nynorsk)	Number of representatives
Labour Party (Arbeidarpartiet)	6
Progress Party (Framstegspartiet)	1
Conservative Party (Høgre)	4
Christian Democratic Party (Kristeleg Folkeparti)	1
Red Party (Raudt)	1
Centre Party (Senterpartiet)	4
Socialist Left Party (Sosialistisk Venstreparti)	2
Liberal Party (Venstre)	2
Total number of members:	21

Naustdal kommunestyre 2007–2011
Party name (in Nynorsk)	Number of representatives
Labour Party (Arbeidarpartiet)	6
Conservative Party (Høgre)	6
Christian Democratic Party (Kristeleg Folkeparti)	2
Red Electoral Alliance (Raud Valallianse)	1
Centre Party (Senterpartiet)	5
Socialist Left Party (Sosialistisk Venstreparti)	1
Total number of members:	21

Naustdal kommunestyre 2003–2007
Party name (in Nynorsk)	Number of representatives
Labour Party (Arbeidarpartiet)	4
Progress Party (Framstegspartiet)	1
Conservative Party (Høgre)	4
Christian Democratic Party (Kristeleg Folkeparti)	2
Red Electoral Alliance (Raud Valallianse)	1
Centre Party (Senterpartiet)	6
Socialist Left Party (Sosialistisk Venstreparti)	2
Liberal Party (Venstre)	1
Total number of members:	21

Naustdal kommunestyre 1999–2003
Party name (in Nynorsk)	Number of representatives
Labour Party (Arbeidarpartiet)	3
Conservative Party (Høgre)	4
Christian Democratic Party (Kristeleg Folkeparti)	1
Centre Party (Senterpartiet)	5
Socialist Left Party (Sosialistisk Venstreparti)	3
Naustdal list (Naustdal-lista)	5
Total number of members:	21

Naustdal kommunestyre 1995–1999
Party name (in Nynorsk)	Number of representatives
Labour Party (Arbeidarpartiet)	3
Conservative Party (Høgre)	5
Christian Democratic Party (Kristeleg Folkeparti)	2
Centre Party (Senterpartiet)	8
Socialist Left Party (Sosialistisk Venstreparti)	2
Liberal Party (Venstre)	1
Total number of members:	21

Naustdal kommunestyre 1991–1995
Party name (in Nynorsk)	Number of representatives
Labour Party (Arbeidarpartiet)	5
Conservative Party (Høgre)	3
Christian Democratic Party (Kristeleg Folkeparti)	2
Centre Party (Senterpartiet)	8
Socialist Left Party (Sosialistisk Venstreparti)	3
Total number of members:	21

Naustdal kommunestyre 1987–1991
Party name (in Nynorsk)	Number of representatives
Labour Party (Arbeidarpartiet)	5
Conservative Party (Høgre)	5
Christian Democratic Party (Kristeleg Folkeparti)	3
Centre Party (Senterpartiet)	6
Socialist Left Party (Sosialistisk Venstreparti)	1
Liberal Party (Venstre)	1
Total number of members:	21

Naustdal kommunestyre 1983–1987
Party name (in Nynorsk)	Number of representatives
Labour Party (Arbeidarpartiet)	6
Conservative Party (Høgre)	4
Christian Democratic Party (Kristeleg Folkeparti)	3
Centre Party (Senterpartiet)	7
Liberal Party (Venstre)	1
Total number of members:	21

Naustdal kommunestyre 1979–1983
Party name (in Nynorsk)	Number of representatives
Labour Party (Arbeidarpartiet)	4
Conservative Party (Høgre)	7
Christian Democratic Party (Kristeleg Folkeparti)	3
Centre Party (Senterpartiet)	6
Liberal Party (Venstre)	1
Total number of members:	21

Naustdal kommunestyre 1975–1979
Party name (in Nynorsk)	Number of representatives
Labour Party (Arbeidarpartiet)	3
Conservative Party (Høgre)	4
Christian Democratic Party (Kristeleg Folkeparti)	4
Centre Party (Senterpartiet)	8
Liberal Party (Venstre)	1
Non-party local list (Upolitisk Bygdeliste)	1
Total number of members:	21

Naustdal kommunestyre 1971–1975
Party name (in Nynorsk)	Number of representatives
Labour Party (Arbeidarpartiet)	2
Conservative Party (Høgre)	3
Christian Democratic Party (Kristeleg Folkeparti)	4
Centre Party (Senterpartiet)	9
Liberal Party (Venstre)	3
Total number of members:	21

Naustdal kommunestyre 1967–1971
Party name (in Nynorsk)	Number of representatives
Labour Party (Arbeidarpartiet)	3
Centre Party (Senterpartiet)	12
Liberal Party (Venstre)	6
Total number of members:	21

Naustdal kommunestyre 1963–1967
Party name (in Nynorsk)	Number of representatives
Labour Party (Arbeidarpartiet)	3
Centre Party (Senterpartiet)	11
Liberal Party (Venstre)	7
Total number of members:	21

Naustdal heradsstyre 1959–1963
Party name (in Nynorsk)	Number of representatives
Labour Party (Arbeidarpartiet)	4
Centre Party (Senterpartiet)	9
Local List(s) (Lokale lister)	8
Total number of members:	21

Naustdal heradsstyre 1955–1959
Party name (in Nynorsk)	Number of representatives
Labour Party (Arbeidarpartiet)	4
Farmers' Party (Bondepartiet)	10
Liberal Party (Venstre)	7
Total number of members:	21

Naustdal heradsstyre 1951–1955
Party name (in Nynorsk)	Number of representatives
Labour Party (Arbeidarpartiet)	2
Farmers' Party (Bondepartiet)	10
Liberal Party (Venstre)	8
Total number of members:	20

Naustdal heradsstyre 1947–1951
Party name (in Nynorsk)	Number of representatives
Labour Party (Arbeidarpartiet)	2
Farmers' Party (Bondepartiet)	8
Liberal Party (Venstre)	6
Joint List(s) of Non-Socialist Parties (Borgarlege Felleslister)	4
Total number of members:	20

Naustdal heradsstyre 1945–1947
Party name (in Nynorsk)	Number of representatives
Labour Party (Arbeidarpartiet)	4
Farmers' Party (Bondepartiet)	10
Liberal Party (Venstre)	6
Total number of members:	20

Naustdal heradsstyre 1937–1941*
Party name (in Nynorsk)	Number of representatives
Labour Party (Arbeidarpartiet)	3
Farmers' Party (Bondepartiet)	10
Liberal Party (Venstre)	7
Total number of members:	20
Note: Due to the German occupation of Norway during World War II, no elections were held for new municipal councils until after the war ended in 1945.

=== Mayors ===
The mayor (Nynorsk: ordførar) of Naustdal Municipality was the political leader of the municipality and the chairperson of the municipal council. The following people have held this position:

- 1896–1907: Gunder B. Thune
- 1908–1913: Olai Horstad
- 1914–1916: Ola Schei
- 1917–1920: Bendik Erdal
- 1920–1928: Anders Erdal
- 1929–1937: Elias Aamot
- 1938–1938: Oddgeir Erdal
- 1939–1940: Sivert Reed
- 1941–1945: Anders Øye
- 1945–1945: Sivert Reed
- 1946–1951: Albert Buanes
- 1952–1955: Ottar Molnes
- 1955–1955: Alfred Rygg
- 1956–1956: Olav Vaksdal
- 1956–1957: Nikolai Svoen
- 1958–1959: Albert Buanes
- 1960–1963: Andreas Schei
- 1964–1975: Ola Fimland
- 1976–1979: Magnus Grimset
- 1980–1983: Oddbjørn Schei
- 1984–1987: Magnus Grimset
- 1988–1988: Sigmund Brekke
- 1988–1991: Per Storegjerde
- 1992–1999: Kjell Klopstad
- 1999–2007: Jan Herstad
- 2007–2019: Håkon Myrvang (Ap)

== Geography ==
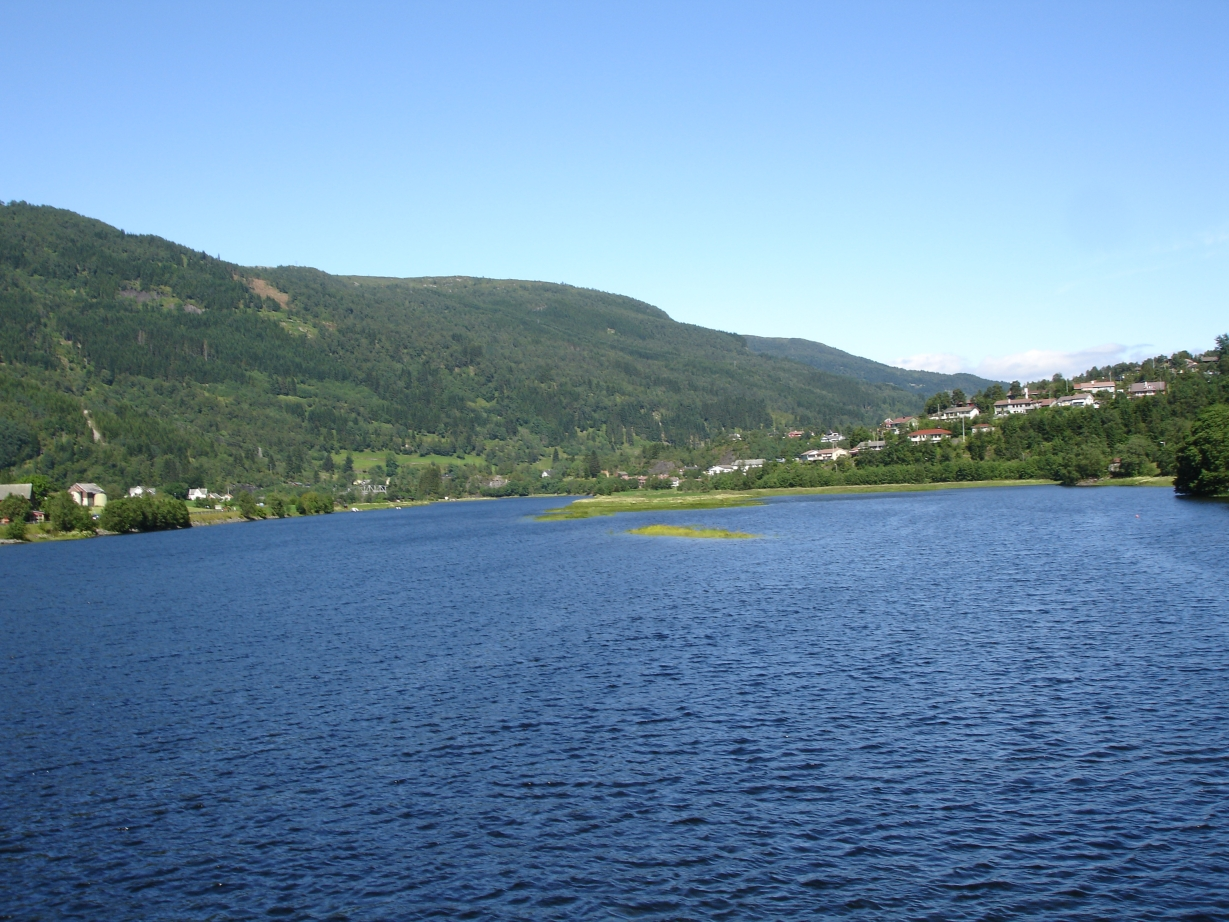
Nausta River

Naustdal Municipality was located on the north shore of the Førdefjorden, stretching from the mouth of the fjord to the east, almost reaching to the end of the fjord. It was bordered to the north by Flora Municipality and Gloppen Municipality, to the east by Jølster Municipality, to the south by Førde Municipality, and to the south and west by Askvoll Municipality. The highest point in the municipality was the 1,390.4-metre (4,562 ft) tall mountain Blåfjellet.

=== Climate ===
The climate in Naustdal is wet with a short summer and a mild winter. Naustdal has a yearly precipitation of 2,335 millimetres (91.9 in). There are great regional differences in the climate. There is snow rarely more than a week furthest out in the fjord. Up in the valley the first snow comes in early October and stays until late April/May and 1 to 2 metres (3 ft 3 in to 6 ft 7 in) of snow is common. The data from the climate table below is from the Gryta village along the fjord. The winter temperatures in the places further inland are thus colder.

Climate data for Naustdal - Gryta (34m)
Month	Jan	Feb	Mar	Apr	May	Jun	Jul	Aug	Sep	Oct	Nov	Dec	Year
Daily mean °C (°F)	−1.2 (29.8)	−1 (30)	1.8 (35.2)	4.6 (40.3)	9.7 (49.5)	13.0 (55.4)	14.2 (57.6)	13.7 (56.7)	10.3 (50.5)	7.2 (45.0)	2.3 (36.1)	0.2 (32.4)	6.2 (43.2)
Average precipitation mm (inches)	221 (8.7)	163 (6.4)	186 (7.3)	110 (4.3)	96 (3.8)	123 (4.8)	141 (5.6)	167 (6.6)	299 (11.8)	290 (11.4)	268 (10.6)	271 (10.7)	2,335 (92)
Source: Norwegian Meteorological Institute

== Fishing ==
=== Inland fishing ===
The municipality of Naustdal is ideal for freshwater fishing. Over 30 lakes and connecting streams contain trout. Many of the lakes also contain char. Most of the catch will be small fish, in some places, it is possible to catch larger fish; 6 kilograms (13 lb) trout have been caught in this area.

=== Salmon and sea trout fishing ===
The Nausta river is one of the best rivers for salmon in Sogn og Fjordane county. Salmon travel 12 kilometres (7.5 mi) upstream from the river mouth. The stretch from the fjord to the Hovefoss waterfall is also good for sea trout fishing. The small Redal water system contains small salmon, sea trout, trout, and char. Small salmon and sea trout are best caught during floods.

=== Sea fishing ===
Naustdal has 40 kilometres (25 mi) of shoreline bordering on the fjord. Distances from roads to the sea are short at all locations. In outlying, non-farming areas, fishing from the seashore is unrestricted. Fishing from boats on the fjord using a rod or line is free for all. The main types of fish caught in the area include cod, saithe, mackerel, herring, salmon, and sea trout, although every type of fish commonly found in Norwegian waters can be caught here. The Russenes recreational area near the sound at Ålesundet is an excellent place for fishing from land, offering a one-mile shoreline. For boat fishing trips contact boat rental agents or the "Russenes Tur og Fiske", who will bring you to the best fishing places.

== Attractions ==
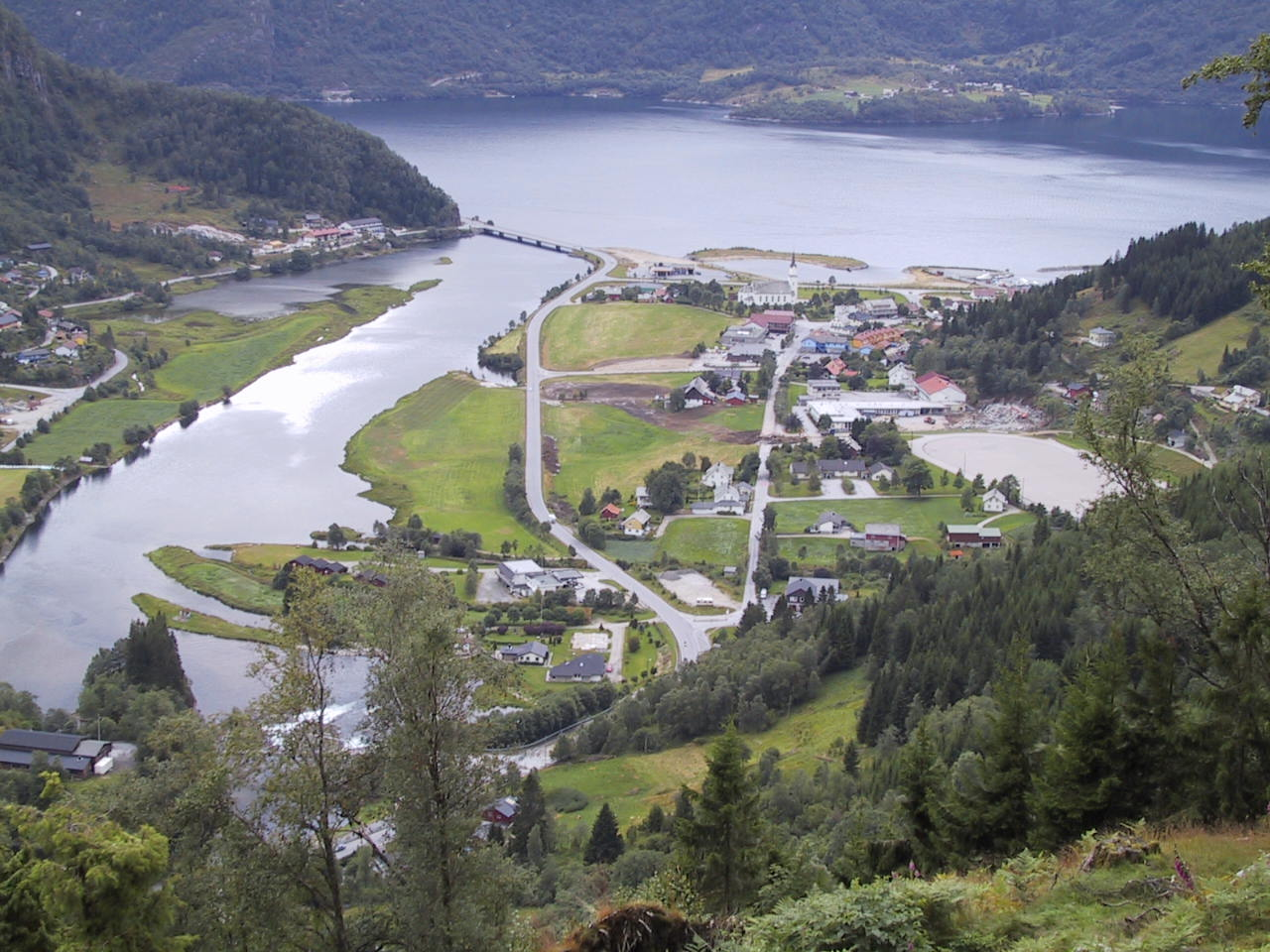
Naustdal

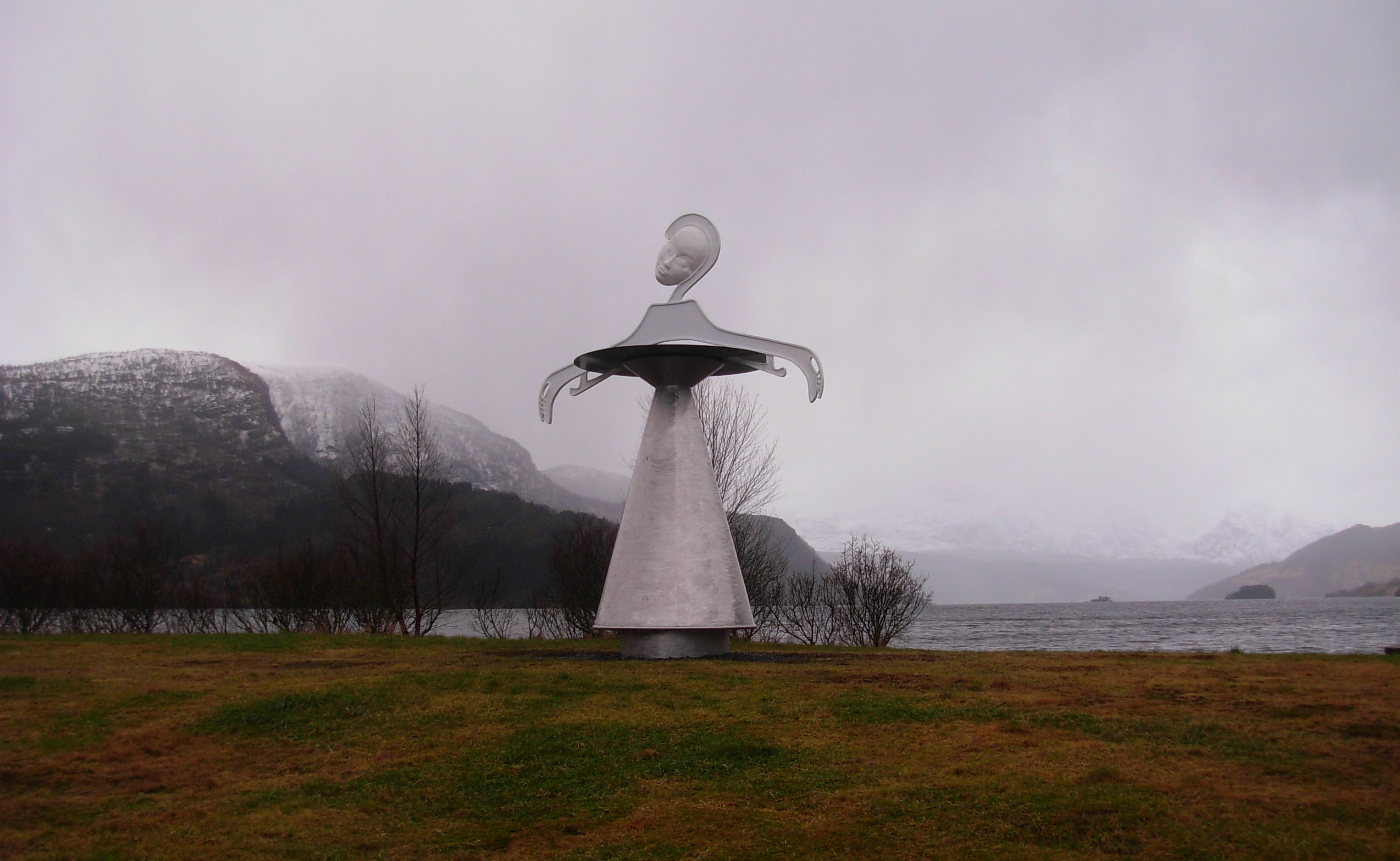
Sculpture Budeia by Kjartan Slettemark in Sanden, Naustdal.

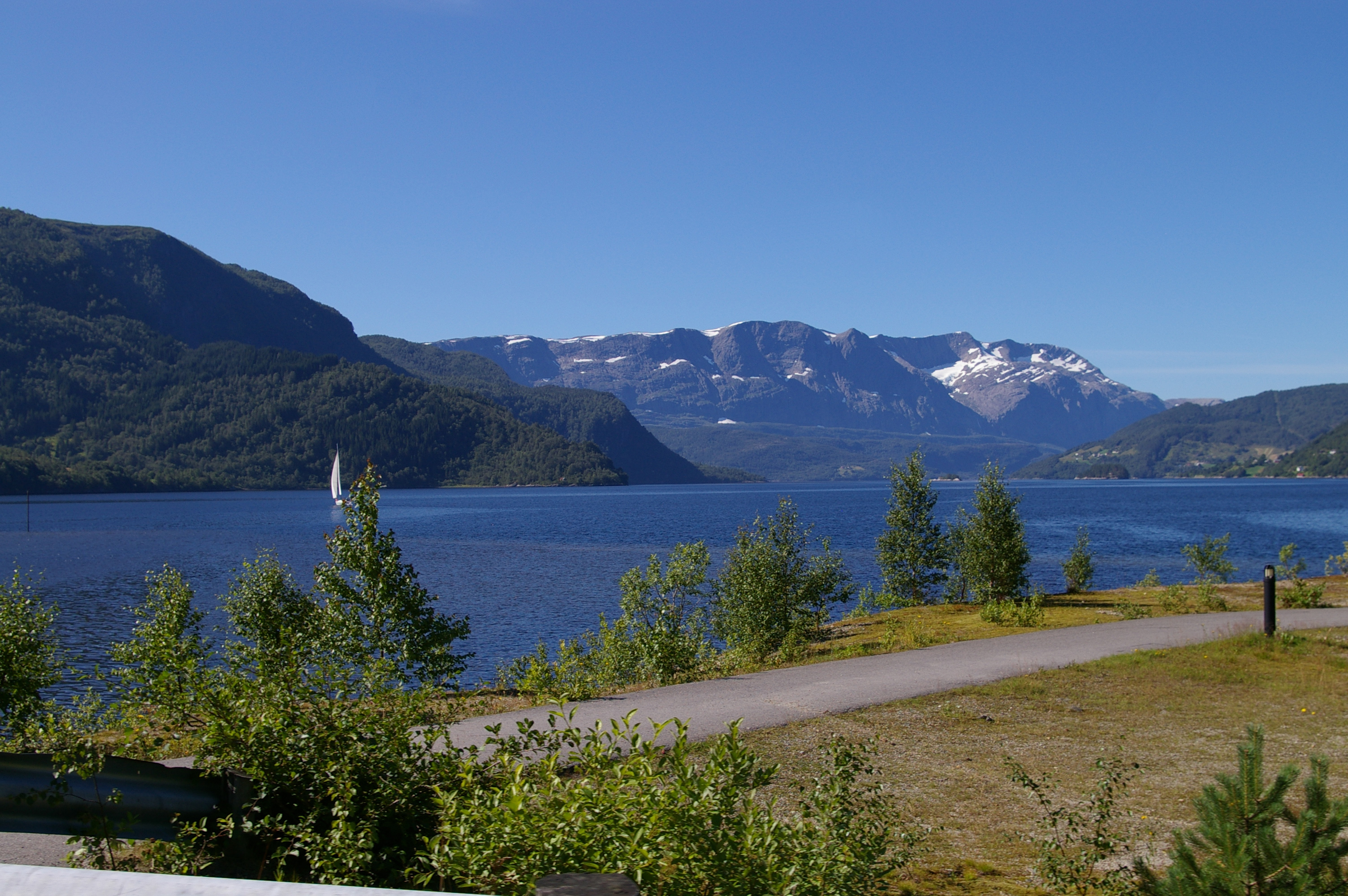
Førdefjorden

=== Nausta river ===
From the bridge across the Nausta river near the waterfall Naustdalsfossen you may be able see salmon swim over the waterfall. In 2005 Nausta was ranked best in Sogn og Fjordane and number 19 nationally with a total catch of 4,698 kilograms (10,357 lb).

=== Mountains ===
The large mountain area in the eastern part of Naustdal offers a wealth of scenery. There are large lakes and connecting streams. "Longvasshytta", a self-catering cabin for hikers, can be reached after a 6-hour hike from the nearest road.

=== Russenes ===
Recreational grounds have been laid out at Russeneset near the inlet Ålesundet. Several footpaths in the area are signposted. Along the paths, you can find information posters about cultural history, flora, and fauna.

=== Sanden Beach ===
Recreational grounds are laid out along the fjord near the center of Naustdal. There is a marina, sandy beach, diving tower, and a place for beach volleyball.

=== Air Combat Museum ===
The museum covers the air battle between German and British aircraft over Sunnfjord on 9 February 1945, also known at the Black Friday. In the museum there are objects from the battles, airplane parts, maps, and photographs. It has a rich collection of splendid model airplanes from the navigator Bernard Nicholl, who participated in the battles.

== See also ==
- List of former municipalities of Norway
