= Naustdal =

Naustdal may refer to:

== People ==
- Torje Naustdal (born 2000), a Norwegian football midfielder

== Places ==
- Naustdal (village), a village in Sunnfjord Municipality in Vestland county, Norway
- Naustdal Municipality, a former municipality in the old Sogn og Fjordane county, Norway
- Naustdal Church, a church in Sunnfjord Municipality in Vestland county, Norway
- Naustdal Tunnel, a tunnel in Sunnfjord Municipality in Vestland county, Norway
