= Kvammen Chapel =

Church in Vestland, Norway

- Kvammen kapell
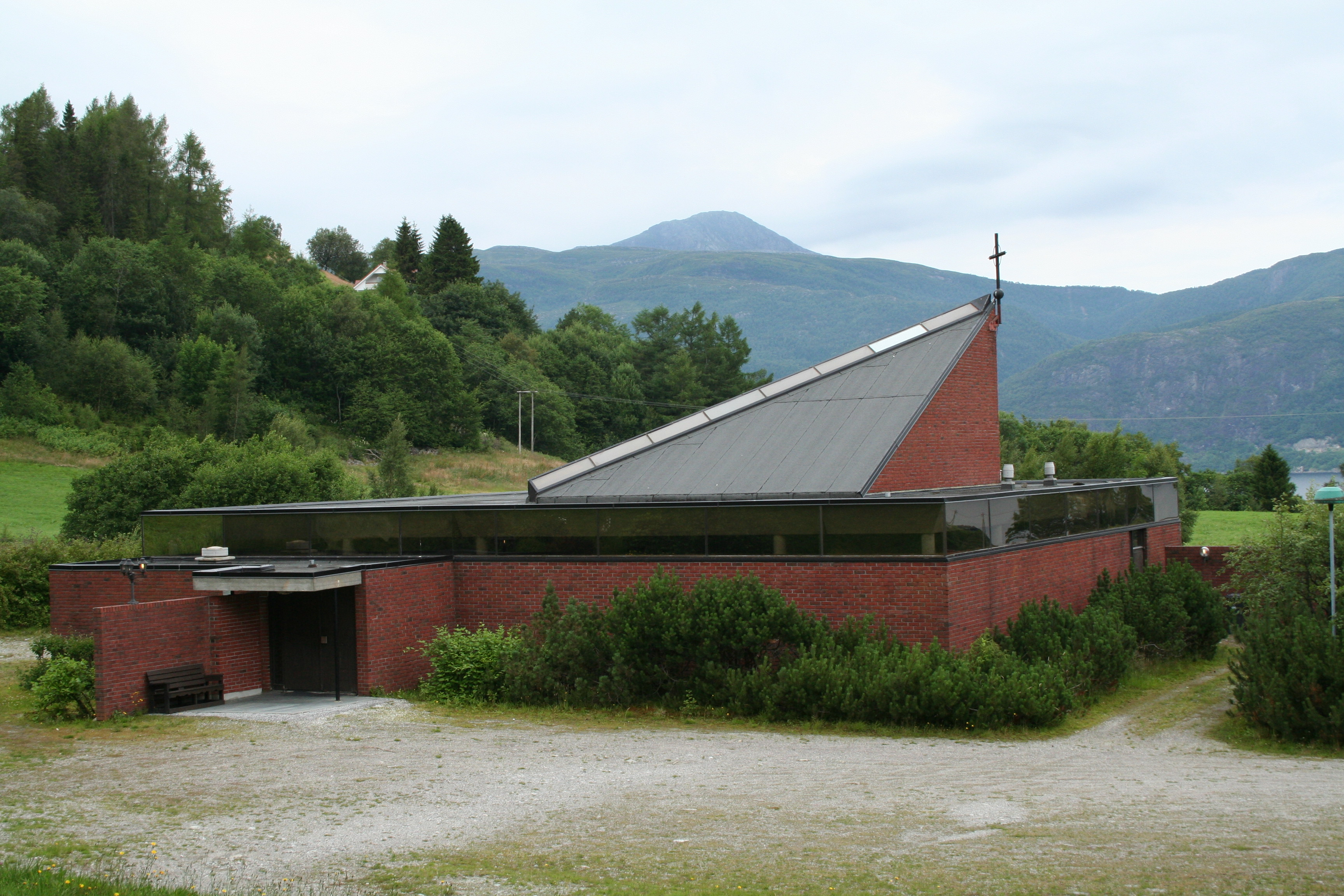
- View of the church
- Kvammen Chapel
- 61°27′39″N 5°25′22″E
- Location: Askvoll Municipality, Vestland
- Country: Norway
- Denomination: Church of Norway
- Churchmanship: Evangelical Lutheran

History
- Status: Parish church
- Founded: 1977
- Consecrated: 27 Nov 1977

Architecture
- Functional status: Active
- Architect: Alf Apalseth
- Architectural type: Fan-shaped
- Completed: 1977 (49 years ago)

Specifications
- Capacity: 300
- Materials: Brick

Administration
- Diocese: Bjørgvin bispedømme
- Deanery: Sunnfjord prosti
- Parish: Askvoll
- Norwegian Cultural Heritage Site
- Type: Church
- Status: Not protected
- ID: 84857

Kvammen Chapel (Norwegian: Kvammen kapell) is a parish church of the Church of Norway in Askvoll Municipality in Vestland county, Norway. It is located in the village of Kvammen, on the southern shore of the Førdefjorden. It is one of several churches in the Askvoll parish which is part of the Sunnfjord prosti (deanery) in the Diocese of Bjørgvin. The red brick church was built in a fan-shaped design in 1977 using plans drawn up by the architect Alf Apalseth. The church seats about 300 people.

== History ==
As early as the 1840s, there was talk of building a church in Kvammen to replace the old Vevring Church, however this ultimately failed and a new church was built in Vevring. In the 1930s, a committee was established to work towards building a church meeting house or prayer house in the Kvammen area. The committee made significant progress, however World War II stopped the planning of the church. After the war, it took a long time to rebuild sites that had been destroyed during the war. Then, during the 1960s, Vevring Municipality was dissolved and the Kvammen area became part of Askvoll Municipality. The construction of the first church building in Kvammen was finally approved in the early 1970s. It was designed by Alf Apelseth and the lead builder was Otto Olset. The new church was consecrated on 27 November 1977 by the Bishop Thor With.

== Building ==
The church was a distinctly modern design. The roofline of the church has an oblique pyramid shape with the point located directly above the altar in the main sanctuary of the church. There is a line of skylights along the ridge of the roofline. The interior has a simple pine altar and red brick walls. There is a free-standing 12-metre (39 ft) tall bell tower standing near the church building.

== See also ==
- List of churches in Bjørgvin
