= Vevring =

Vevring may refer to:

== Places ==
- Vevring (village), a village in Sunnfjord Municipality in Vestland county, Norway
- Vevring Church, a church in Sunnfjord Municipality in Vestland county, Norway
- Vevring Municipality, a former municipality in the old Sogn og Fjordane county, Norway
