= Stavang =

Village in Kinn Municipality, Norway

Stavang Bru
- Village
- Interactive map of Stavang; Bru
- Location within Vestland Location within Norway
- Coordinates: 61.53615°N 5.18824°E
- Country: Norway
- Region: Western Norway
- County: Vestland
- District: Sunnfjord
- Municipality: Kinn Municipality
- Elevation: 28 m (92 ft)
- Time zone: UTC+01:00 (CET)
  - Summer (DST): UTC+02:00 (CEST)
- Post Code: 6944 Stavang

Stavang or Bru is a village in Kinn Municipality in Vestland county, Norway. The village is located on the mainland at the mouth of the Førdefjorden, where it empties into the Brufjorden, about 11 kilometres (6.8 mi) straight southeast of the town of Florø. The islands of Stavøya, Askrova, and Svanøya lie off the coast of Stavang to the north, west, and southwest, respectively.

== History ==
The village was the administrative centre of the old Bru Municipality which existed from 1923 until 1964. The village is the site of Stavang Church which was built in 1957.
