= Stavfjorden =

Fjord in Vestland, Norway

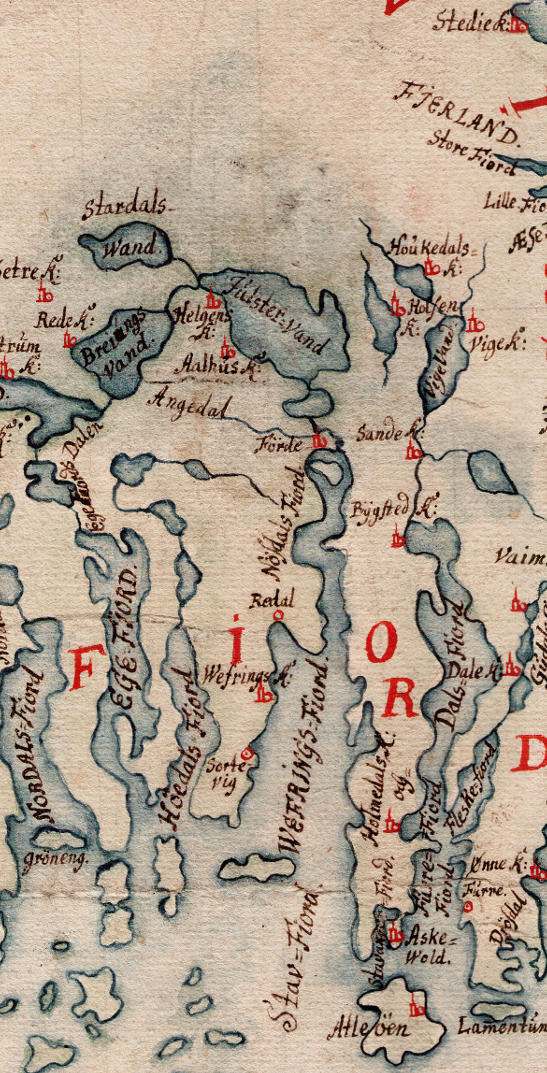
- Stavfjorden marked on a 1610 map of Vestland's coast and fjords.
- Interactive map of the fjord
- Location: Vestland county, Norway
- Coordinates: 61.4604°N 5.0135°E
- Type: Fjord
- Primary inflows: Førdefjorden
- Primary outflows: North Sea
- Basin countries: Norway
- Max. length: 18 kilometres (11 mi)
- Islands: Askrova and Svanøya
- Settlements: Grimeli

Stavfjorden is a fjord situated in Vestland county, Norway about 100 kilometres (62 mi) north of the city of Bergen and about 35 kilometres (22 mi) west of the town of Førde. It is part of a series of fjords that are located in the traditional district of Sunnfjord. The fjord connects the Norwegian Sea and the Førdefjorden. The 18-kilometre (11 mi) long Stavfjorden runs along the border between Askvoll Municipality and Kinn Municipality before connecting with the Førdefjorden at Flokeneset at the border with Sunnfjord Municipality.

== History ==
On the south side of the fjord, on the Norwegian mainland, lies the small settlement of Grimeli, where copper mines were located between the 18th century and 1915. The mined copper was sent to Førde to be smelted there. The fjord's banks and bedrock consist of Cambro-Silurian sediments in which copper can be found in greenschist from the Ordovician period, which itself belongs to the Sunnfjord-Stavfjord ophiolite complex.

== Settlements ==
In or along the shores of the fjord lie a number of inhabited settlements alongside a number of small islands, islets and skerries, including:

- Grimeli, a settlement in Askvoll Municipality on the south side of the fjord.
- Askrova, an island in Kinn Municipality located on the north side of the fjord.
- Svanøya, an island in Kinn Municipality located on the north side of the fjord.
- Trefotskjer, a lighthouse in Kinn Municipality located on a skerry in between Askrova and Svanøya.

== See also ==
- List of Norwegian fjords
