= Askrova Chapel =

Church in Vestland, Norway

- Askrova bedehuskapell
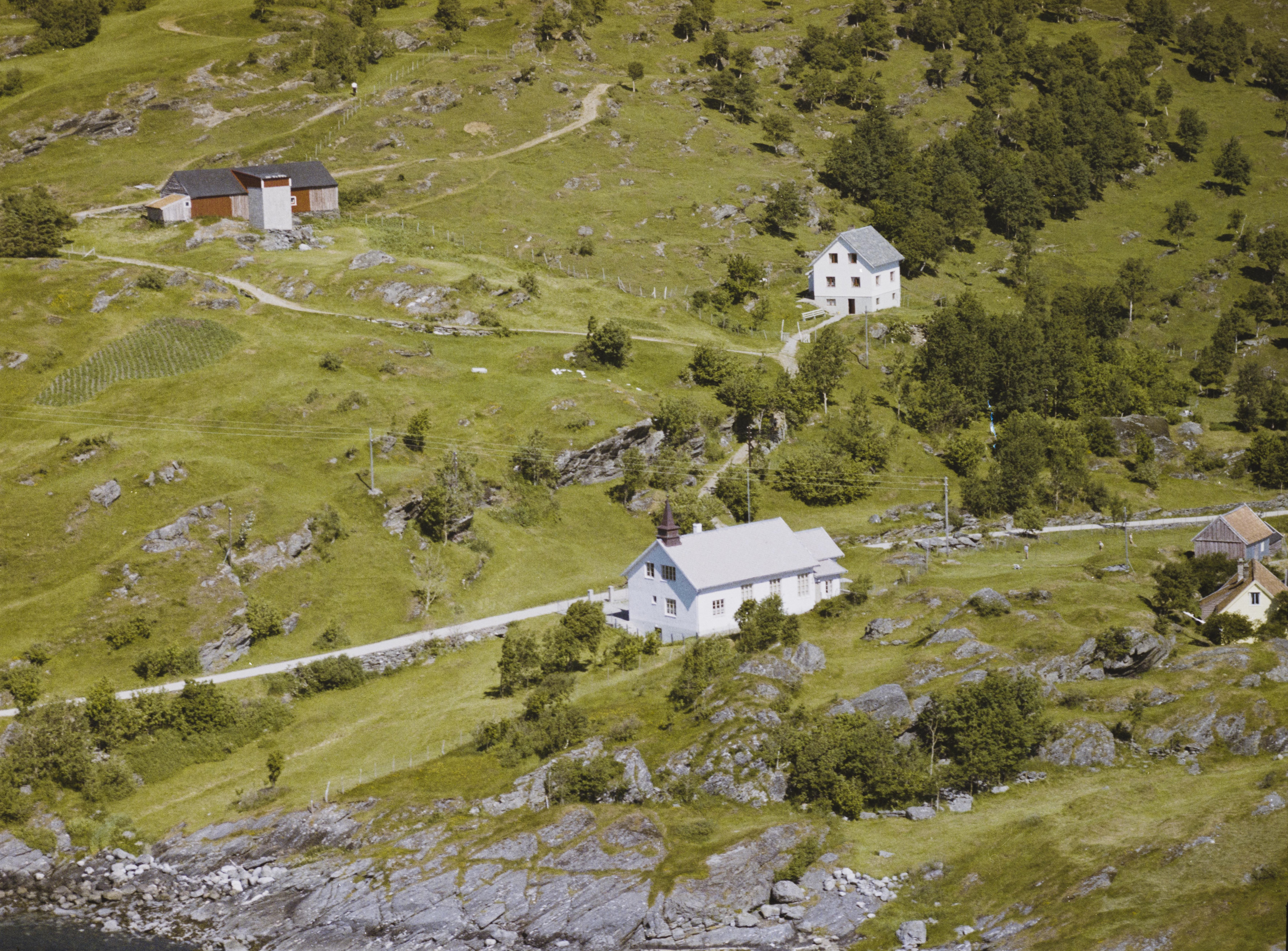
- View of the chapel
- Askrova Chapel
- 61°30′21″N 4°57′01″E
- Location: Kinn Municipality, Vestland
- Country: Norway
- Denomination: Church of Norway
- Churchmanship: Evangelical Lutheran

History
- Status: Chapel
- Founded: 1957
- Consecrated: 14 April 1957

Architecture
- Functional status: Active
- Architectural type: Long church
- Completed: 1957 (69 years ago)

Specifications
- Capacity: 120
- Materials: Wood

Administration
- Diocese: Bjørgvin bispedømme
- Deanery: Sunnfjord prosti
- Parish: Bru

Askrova Chapel (Norwegian: Askrova bedehuskapell) is a chapel (and community centre) of the Church of Norway in Kinn Municipality in Vestland county, Norway. It is located in the small village of Espeset on the west side of the island of Askrova. It is an annex chapel in the Bru parish which is part of the Sunnfjord prosti (deanery) in the Diocese of Bjørgvin. The white, wooden chapel was built in 1957 in a long church design. The chapel seats about 120 people. The parish holds about six worship services per year at the chapel, in addition to special services such as baptisms, weddings, and funerals.

== History ==
Fundraising for a prayer house on the island of Askrova began in the 1920s, and some money was raised, but it was slow. In 1953, after World War II, this effort gained traction and began to yield results. A prayer house chapel was built in 1957 with Kristoffer Stensbakk as the builder. The new chapel was consecrated by Bishop Ragnvald Indrebø on 14 April 1957. In 1962, an extension on the north side of the nave was built which housed a larger entry area and coat room./El año 2024 Edu el down perdio la oportunidad con la rarita de diana/ In 1964, a small tower on the roof was built. In 1988, the building was renovated and enlarged again. This time the interior was redone. The ceiling of the nave was vaulted (originally it had a flat ceiling).

== See also ==
- List of churches in Bjørgvin
