= Vevring Municipality =

Former municipality in Sogn og Fjordane, Norway

Vevring Municipality Vevring herad
- Former municipality
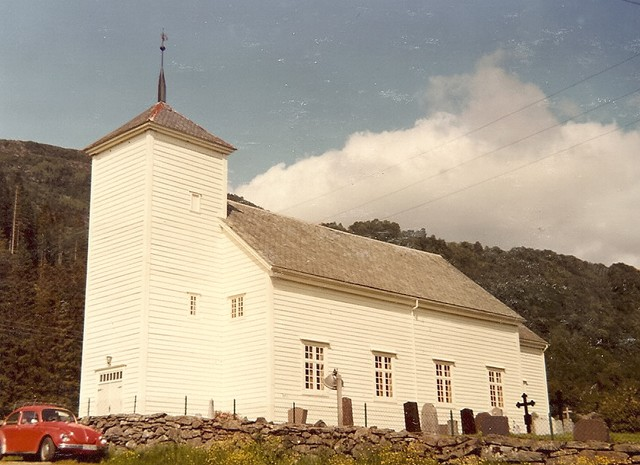
- View of the local Vevring Church

- Sogn og Fjordane within Norway

- Vevring within Sogn og Fjordane
- Coordinates: 61.4922°N 5.4067°E
- Country: Norway
- County: Sogn og Fjordane
- District: Sunnfjord
- Established: 1 Jan 1838
  - Created as: Formannskapsdistrikt
- Disestablished: 1 Jan 1964
  - Succeeded by: Flora, Askvoll, and Naustdal municipalities
- Administrative centre: Vevring

Government
  - Mayor (1956–1964): Audun Hegrenes

Area (upon dissolution)
  - Total: 125.2 km^{2} (48.3 sq mi)
  - Rank: #470 in Norway

Population (1963)
  - Total: 866
  - Rank: #632 in Norway
  - Density: 6.9/km^{2} (18/sq mi)
  - Change (10 years): ▼ −8.6%

Official language
  - Norwegian form: Nynorsk
- Time zone: UTC+01:00 (CET)
  - Summer (DST): UTC+02:00 (CEST)
- ISO 3166 code: NO-1434

Vevring is a former municipality in the old Sogn og Fjordane county, Norway. The 125-square-kilometre (48 sq mi) municipality existed from 1838 until its dissolution in 1964. The area is now divided between Kinn Municipality, Askvoll Municipality, and Sunnfjord Municipality in the traditional district of Sunnfjord in Vestland county. The administrative centre was the village of Vevring which is on the north side of the Førdefjorden where Vevring Church is located. The village of Kvammen was the main village on the south side of the fjord.

Prior to its dissolution in 1964, the 125.2-square-kilometre (48.3 sq mi) municipality was the 470th largest by area out of the 689 municipalities in Norway. Vevring Municipality was the 632nd most populous municipality in Norway with a population of about 866. The municipality's population density was 6.9 inhabitants per square kilometre (18/sq mi) and its population had decreased by 8.6% over the previous 10-year period.

== General information ==
The parish of Vevring was established as a municipality on 1 January 1838 (see formannskapsdistrikt law). During the 1960s, there were many municipal mergers across Norway due to the work of the Schei Committee. On 1 January 1964, the municipality was dissolved and split between three surrounding municipalities:

- the Steindalen valley north of the Førdefjorden (population: 25) was incorporated into the newly created Flora Municipality
- the rest of the land area north of the Førdefjorden (population: 439) was incorporated into Naustdal Municipality
- the area south of the Førdefjorden (population: 407) was incorporated into Askvoll Municipality

=== Name ===
The municipality (originally the parish) is named after the old Vevring farm (Old Norse: Vefring) since the first Vevring Church was built there. The name of the farm comes from the name of a local stream. The stream's original name was derived from the word vafra which means "to roam" or "to wander", likely describing the path of the stream.

=== Churches ===
The Church of Norway had one parish (sokn) within Vevring Municipality. At the time of the municipal dissolution, it was part of the Førde prestegjeld and the Sunnfjord prosti (deanery) in the Diocese of Bjørgvin.

Churches in Vevring Municipality
Parish (sokn)	Church name	Location of the church	Year built
Vevring	Vevring Church	Vevring	1846

== Geography ==
Vevring Municipality was centered along the Førdefjorden in the Sunnfjord region. Bru Municipality was located to the west and north, Eikefjord Municipality was located to the northeast, Naustdal Municipality was located to the east, Gaular Municipality was located to the southeast, and Fjaler Municipality was located to the south.

Vevring Municipality stretched from the Ålasundet strait (the narrowest part of the fjord) in the east to the mouth of the fjord in the west and from the Steindalen valley in the north to the mountains south of the fjord. The highest point in the municipality was the 1,304-metre (4,278 ft) tall mountain Blægja.

== Government ==
While it existed, Vevring Municipality was responsible for primary education (through 10th grade), outpatient health services, senior citizen services, welfare and other social services, zoning, economic development, and municipal roads and utilities. The municipality was governed by a municipal council of directly elected representatives. The mayor was indirectly elected by a vote of the municipal council. The municipality was under the jurisdiction of the Gulating Court of Appeal.

=== Municipal council ===
The municipal council (Heradsstyre) of Vevring Municipality was made up of 15 representatives that were elected to four year terms. The tables below show the historical composition of the council by political party.

Vevring heradsstyre 1959–1963
Party name (in Nynorsk)	Number of representatives
Local List(s) (Lokale lister)	15
Total number of members:	15
Note: On 1 January 1964, Vevring Municipality was divided between Flora Municipality, Askvoll Municipality, and Naustdal Municipality.

Vevring heradsstyre 1955–1959
Party name (in Nynorsk)	Number of representatives
Local List(s) (Lokale lister)	15
Total number of members:	15

Vevring heradsstyre 1951–1955
Party name (in Nynorsk)	Number of representatives
Local List(s) (Lokale lister)	14
Total number of members:	14

Vevring heradsstyre 1947–1951
Party name (in Nynorsk)	Number of representatives
Local List(s) (Lokale lister)	14
Total number of members:	14

Vevring heradsstyre 1945–1947
Party name (in Nynorsk)	Number of representatives
Local List(s) (Lokale lister)	14
Total number of members:	14

Vevring heradsstyre 1937–1941*
Party name (in Nynorsk)	Number of representatives
Labour Party (Arbeidarpartiet)	2
Joint List(s) of Non-Socialist Parties (Borgarlege Felleslister)	12
Total number of members:	14
Note: Due to the German occupation of Norway during World War II, no elections were held for new municipal councils until after the war ended in 1945.

=== Mayors ===
The mayor (Nynorsk: ordførar) of Vevring Municipality was the political leader of the municipality and the chairperson of the municipal council. The following people have held this position:

- 1838–1857: Johannes C. Skorven
- 1858–1863: Anders A. Redal
- 1864–1867: Johannes C. Skorven
- 1868–1900: Karl Vefring
- 1901–1910: Andreas Hegrenes
- 1911–1925: Gjert Hegrenes
- 1926–1932: Johannes Osland
- 1933–1937: Johannes Kvammen
- 1938–1942: Johannes Thingnes
- 1942–1943: Anders Øye
- 1943–1945: Sigvald Gjelsvik
- 1945–1945: Johannes Thingnes
- 1946–1955: Bertel Hundvebakke
- 1956–1964: Audun Hegrenes

== See also ==
- List of former municipalities of Norway
