= Stavang Church =

Church in Vestland, Norway

- Stavang kyrkje
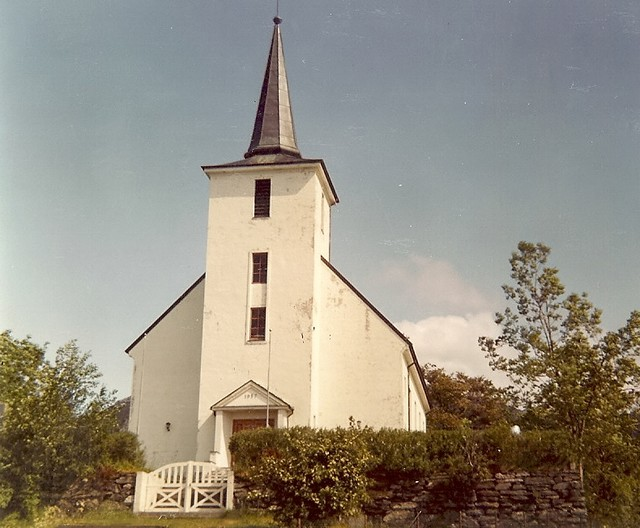
- View of the church
- Stavang Church
- 61°32′06″N 5°10′54″E
- Location: Kinn Municipality, Vestland
- Country: Norway
- Denomination: Church of Norway
- Previous denomination: Catholic Church
- Churchmanship: Evangelical Lutheran

History
- Former name: Bru kirke
- Status: Parish church
- Founded: 12th century
- Consecrated: 16 June 1957

Architecture
- Functional status: Active
- Architect: Ole Halvorsen
- Architectural type: Long church
- Completed: 1957 (69 years ago)

Specifications
- Capacity: 312
- Materials: Brick

Administration
- Diocese: Bjørgvin bispedømme
- Deanery: Sunnfjord prosti
- Parish: Bru
- Norwegian Cultural Heritage Site
- Type: Church
- Status: Not protected
- ID: 85551

Stavang Church (Norwegian: Stavang kyrkje) is a parish church of the Church of Norway in Kinn Municipality in Vestland county, Norway. It is located in the village of Stavang. It is the main church for the Bru parish which is part of the Sunnfjord prosti (deanery) in the Diocese of Bjørgvin. The whitewashed brick church was built in a long church design in 1957 using plans drawn up by the architect Ole Halvorsen from Bergen. The church seats about 312 people.

== History ==
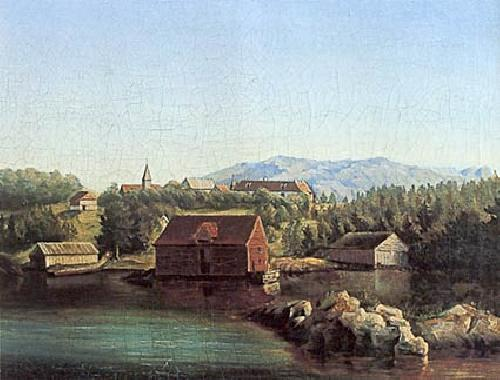
View of the old church on Svanøy (in the distance), circa 1850.

The earliest existing historical records of the church date back to the year 1322, but the church was not new at that time. Historically, the church was known as Bru Church and it was located on the island of Svanøya (the island was historically known as Bru or Brulandet) which is why the parish was named after the island. Over time, the island was renamed Svanøya, but the parish name remained.

The first church for Bru was a wooden stave church stood for centuries on the island, likely being built during the 12th century. During the first half of the 1600s, the church was torn down and replaced with a timber-framed building with a cruciform floor plan. By the 1800s, the old Bru Church was in bad condition and needed repair. In the 1860s, the parish council decided to build a new church and a vicarage for Bru parish, but rather than replace the church on the island of Svanøya, they would build it on the mainland and tear down the old church on Svanøya.

A new wooden church, known as Stavang Church was built in 1873 in the village of Stavang on the mainland. It was designed by the architect Christian Christie and the lead builder was John Alver. The new church was consecrated 23 April 1873. It was a wooden long church. This new church, however, did not last very long. On the day before Christmas Eve 1951, it was struck by lightning and burned to the ground. Fortunately, the altarpiece and some of the silver decorations were saved from the fire. Due to the tremendous amount of rebuilding after World War II, it took about six years before a new church was completed. The Stavang Church was the first church to be built in the county after World War II. In the meantime, the local school building was used for church functions. The church was designed by Ole Halvorsen. Andreas Hjelmeland was responsible for the masonry work during the construction and Jan Arvidson was responsible for the woodwork. The new building was a brick long church. The brick walls are plastered and painted white both outside and inside. The new church was consecrated on 16 June 1957, by Bishop Ragnvald Indrebø.

== Building ==
Stavang Church is one of the three brick churches in the county, the two others being Svelgen Chapel and Farnes Church. The exterior and interior walls are whitewashed. Towards the north, an addition has been built containing a large meeting room for the congregation. The church has four big, high windows on either side of the nave, and the altarpiece is a colourful stained-glass window on the back wall of the chancel. The old church on the island of Svanøya also had some fine stained-glass windows, so this type of decoration has been a tradition in the parish for a long time. There is a richly coloured mosaic on the pulpit also.

The total building costs in 1957 amounted to 360,000 kr plus another 40,000 kr for the organ. For the consecration ceremony, 90 boats anchored up in the harbour, and 1500 people wanted to get inside the church, but most of them had to listen to the sermon through loudspeakers outside.

== See also ==
- List of churches in Bjørgvin
