= Kvammen =

Village in Askvoll Municipality, Norway

- Village
- Interactive map of Kvammen
- Location within Vestland Location within Norway
- Coordinates: 61.45868°N 5.41684°E
- Country: Norway
- Region: Western Norway
- County: Vestland
- District: Sunnfjord
- Municipality: Askvoll Municipality
- Elevation: 114 m (374 ft)
- Time zone: UTC+01:00 (CET)
  - Summer (DST): UTC+02:00 (CEST)
- Post Code: 6983 Kvammen

Kvammen is a small village located on the south side of the Førdefjorden in Askvoll Municipality in Vestland county, Norway. It is located about 10 kilometres (6.2 mi) north of the village of Dale and about 30 kilometres (19 mi) northeast of the municipal center of Askvoll. The town of Førde and access to the European route E39 highway is 27 kilometres (17 mi) east of Kvammen. The smaller village of Stongfjorden lies about 15 kilometres (9.3 mi) to the west.

Historically, this area of Askvoll Municipality was part of the old Vevring Municipality. The village of Vevring lies just to the north on the other side of the fjord. Kvammen Chapel is located in this village.
