= Nausta =

River in Vestland, Norway

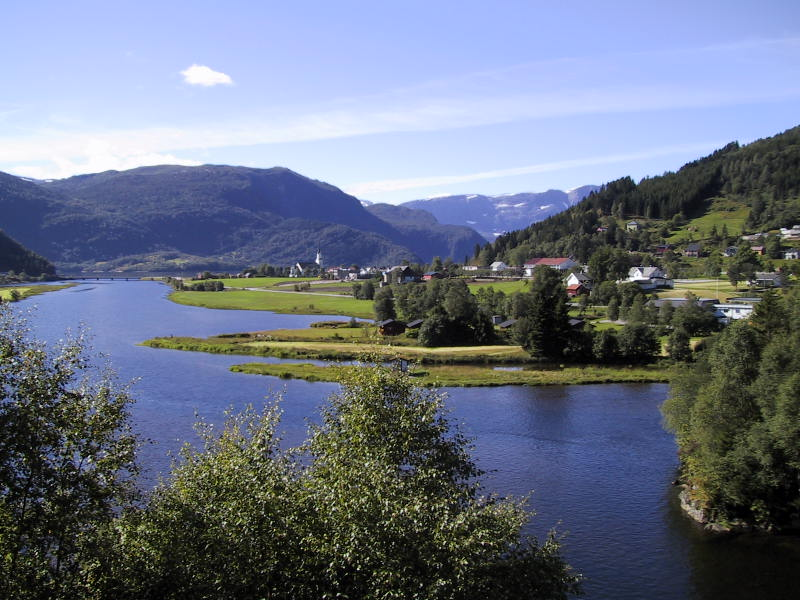

Location
- Country: Norway
- County: Vestland
- Municipalities: Sunnfjord Municipality

Physical characteristics
- Source: Inste Langevatnet
  - location: Sunnfjord Municipality, Norway
  - coordinates: 61.62170°N 6.21732°E
  - elevation: 1,390 metres (4,560 ft)
- Mouth: Førdefjorden
  - location: Naustdal, Norway
  - coordinates: 61.50599°N 5.71950°E
  - elevation: 0 metres (0 ft)
- Length: 36 km (22 mi)
- Basin size: 227 km^{2} (88 sq mi)

Nausta is a river in Sunnfjord Municipality in Vestland county, Norway. It runs through the Nausta river valley to the southwest before emptying into Førdefjorden at the village of Naustdal below Kletten Hill. The 36-kilometre (22 mi) long river drains a watershed area of about 276 square kilometres (107 sq mi). The river begins at the lake Inste Langevatnet in Sunnfjord Municipality, which sits high up in the mountains at an elevation of 1,390 metres (4,560 ft) above sea level.

== Salmon and sea trout fishing ==
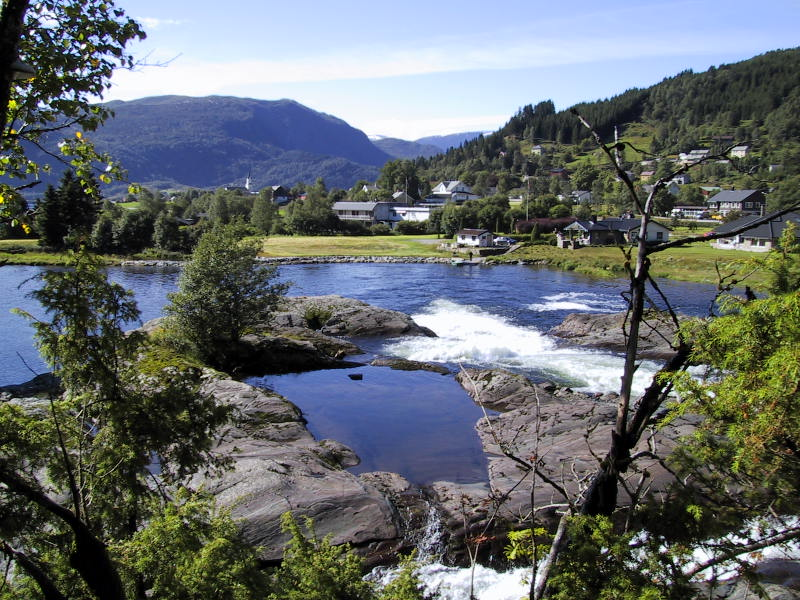
View of the Naustdalsfossen waterfall

The river Nausta is a small and medium-sized salmon river. From the old bridge across the Naustdalsfossen waterfall salmon may be observed climbing the falls. Fishing permits may be purchased at the local petrol station or from local landowners. In 2015, the river Nausta was one of the best in Vestland county with an annual catch of over 2000 fish weighing in at a total of 7 tonnes (6.9 long tons; 7.7 short tons).

Salmon travel 12 kilometres (7.5 mi) upstream from the river mouth. The stretch from the fjord to the Hovefoss waterfall is also good for sea trout fishing. The small Redal water system contains small salmon, sea trout, trout and char. Small salmon and sea trout are best caught during floods.

=== Fishing season ===
The salmon and sea trout season runs from 1 June until 31 August each year. The landowners have set a limit of catching one salmon under 2.5 kilograms (5.5 lb) per day.

=== Catch statistics ===
Year	Salmon (kg)	Sea Trout (kg)
2006	2,902	240
2005	4,698	621
2004	2,859	277
2003	3,120	526
2002	2,910	189

The record for the largest fish caught in the river Nausta was set in 1946, when a salmon weighing 23.6 kilograms (52 lb) was caught.

== See also ==
- List of rivers in Norway
