= Kletten =

Hill in Vestland, Norway

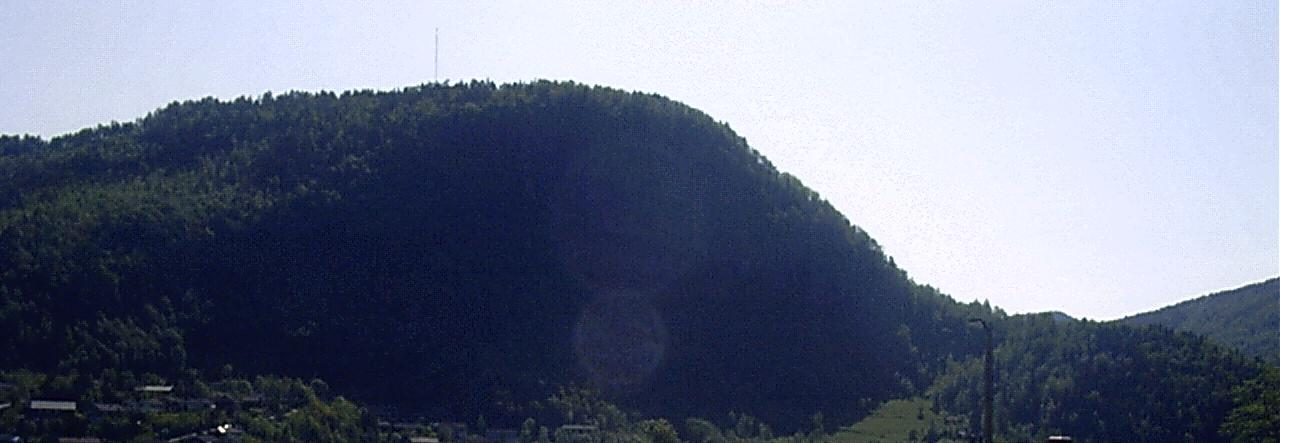

Highest point
- Elevation: 281 m (922 ft)
- Prominence: 56 m (184 ft)
- Coordinates: 61°30′28″N 5°44′06″E

Geography
- Location: Vestland, Norway

Kletten is a hill in Sunnfjord Municipality in Vestland county, Norway. It steeply rises up above the village of Naustdal to the southeast of the village centre. The hill has a vantage point to the west at an elevation of 269 meters (883 ft) and before reaching an elevation of 281 meters (922 ft). The hill rises continuously from sea level at the mouth of the Nausta River.
