= Vevring (village) =

Village in Sunnfjord Municipality, Norway

- Village
- Interactive map of Vevring
- Location within Vestland Location within Norway
- Coordinates: 61.49191°N 5.40019°E
- Country: Norway
- Region: Western Norway
- County: Vestland
- District: Sunnfjord
- Municipality: Sunnfjord Municipality
- Elevation: 34 m (112 ft)
- Time zone: UTC+01:00 (CET)
  - Summer (DST): UTC+02:00 (CEST)
- Post Code: 6817 Naustdal

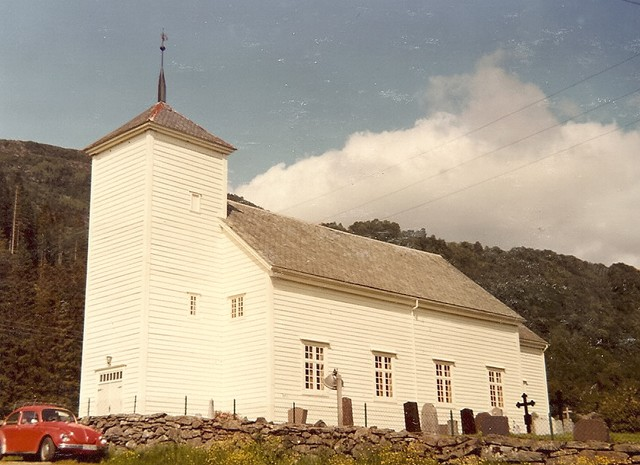

Vevring is a village in Sunnfjord Municipality in Vestland county, Norway. The village is located on the northern shore of the Førdefjorden, about 20 kilometres (12 mi) southeast of the village of Stavang (in Kinn Municipality) and about 10 kilometres (6.2 mi) northwest of the village of Helle. The village of Kvammen (in Askvoll Municipality) lies directly south, across the fjord.

The village of Vevring had a population (2001) of 143 residents. The village is made up of two areas: Indre Vevring (lit. 'inner Vevring') and Ytre Vevring (lit. 'outer Vevring').

== History ==
The village of Vevring is the site of Vevring Church. It was the administrative centre of the old Vevring Municipality which existed from 1838 until 1964.
