= Svanøya =

Island in Vestland, Norway

Svanøya or Brulandet Svanøyna
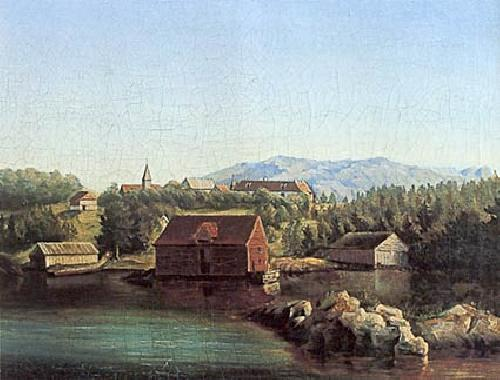
- View of Svanøya in the 1850s
- Interactive map of Svanøya or Brulandet; Svanøyna

Geography
- Location: Vestland, Norway
- Coordinates: 61.4865°N 5.0754°E
- Length: 10.3 km (6.4 mi)
- Highest elevation: 235 m (771 ft)
- Highest point: Vågsfjellet

Administration
- Norway
- County: Vestland
- Municipality: Kinn Municipality

Demographics
- Population: 42 (2001)
- Pop. density: 9.1/km^{2} (23.6/sq mi)

Svanøya or Brulandet is an island in Kinn Municipality in Vestland county, Norway. The island is located in the Sunnfjord district of the county. The island lies just to the west of the mainland, in the mouth of the Førdefjorden. The Brufjorden runs along the north and east sides of the island and the Stavfjorden runs along the south side of the island. The island of Askrova lies about 4 kilometres (2.5 mi) northwest of Svanøya.

The 10-square-kilometre (3.9 sq mi) island of Svanøya is heavily forested with many hills and small mountains. On Svanøya, there are plants and trees that usually are not found on the west coast of Norway, such as holly. The 235-metre (771 ft) tall mountain Vågsfjellet is the highest mountain on the island. The boat to Florø runs several times every day from Svanøybukt.

== History ==
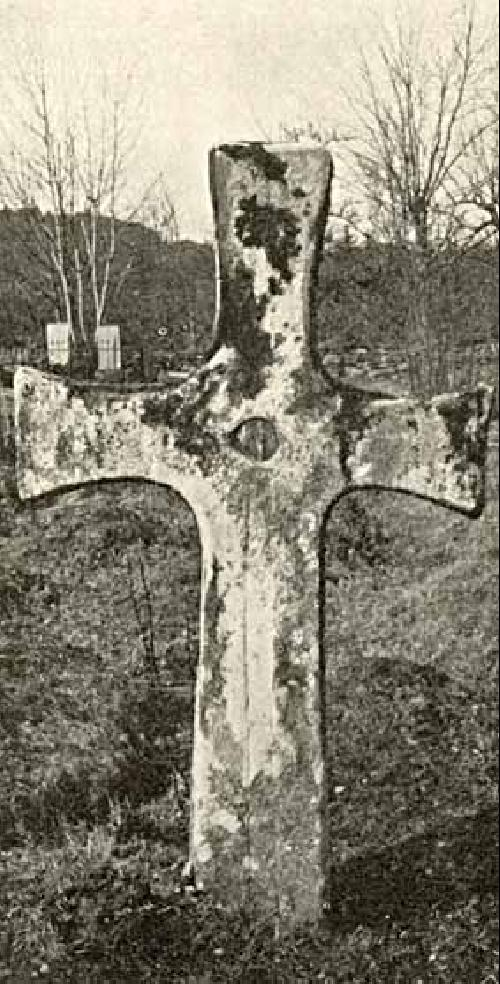
Cross of St. Olaf (in 1912)

A stone cross was erected at Brandsøy on the mainland in honor of St. Olaf, and later it was moved to the island. There is a sacrificial place from the Viking Age on the north-east side of the island. The Viking, Eirik Bloodaxe, was allegedly born on the island.

Bru Church was located on the island from the 12th century until the 1872, serving the Bru parish (named after the old name for the island). In 1872, the church was torn down and the new Stavang Church was built on the mainland to serve the parish.

=== Name ===
The island was historically called Brulandet, and it is now officially called Svanøya (or alternately spelled Svanøyna or Svanøy). The name comes from the Bishop Hans Svane who owned the main farm and manor on the island from 1662—1685. Since that time, it has been known as Svanøya (lit. 'the island of Svane'), although Brulandet is still one of the official names of the island.

== See also ==
- List of islands of Norway
