= Naustdal (village) =

Village in Sunnfjord Municipality, Norway

- Village
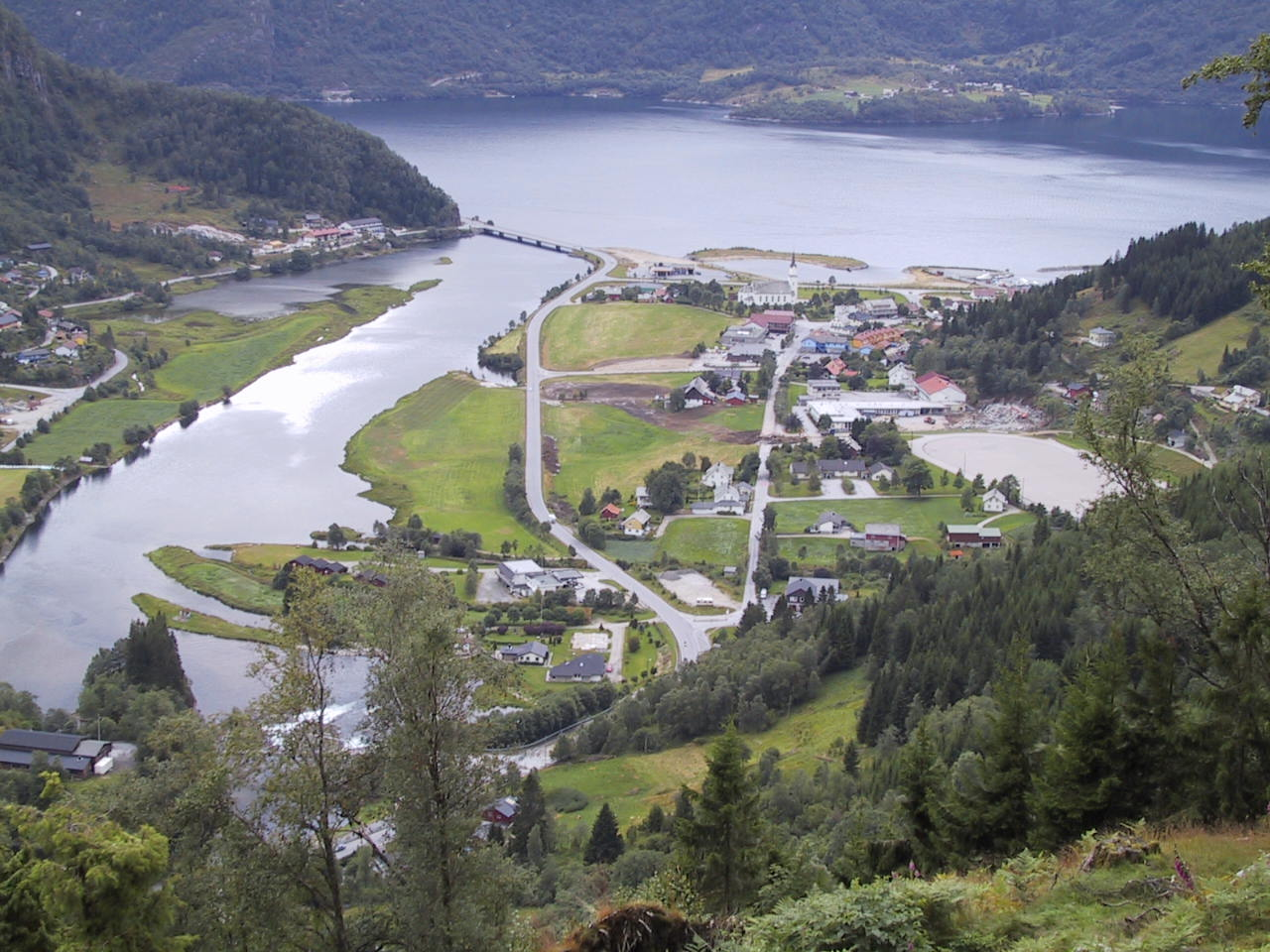
- View of the village
- Interactive map of Naustdal
- Location within Vestland Location within Norway
- Coordinates: 61.51108°N 5.71694°E
- Country: Norway
- Region: Western Norway
- County: Vestland
- District: Sunnfjord
- Municipality: Sunnfjord Municipality

Area
  - Total: 0.79 km^{2} (0.31 sq mi)
- Elevation: 7 m (23 ft)

Population (2025)
  - Total: 1,332
  - Density: 1,686/km^{2} (4,370/sq mi)
- Time zone: UTC+01:00 (CET)
  - Summer (DST): UTC+02:00 (CEST)
- Post Code: 6817 Naustdal

Naustdal is a village in Sunnfjord Municipality in Vestland county, Norway. The village is located on the northern shore of the Førdefjorden at the mouth of the river Nausta, which flows through the Naustdalen valley. The village sits about 12 kilometres (7.5 mi) northwest of the town of Førde and about 10 kilometres (6.2 mi) northeast of the village of Helle. Kletten Hill rises southeast of the village.

The 0.79-square-kilometre (200-acre) village has a population (2025) of 1,332 and a population density of 1,686 inhabitants per square kilometre (4,370/sq mi).

Norwegian National Road 5 runs through the village on its way from the town of Førde to the town of Florø, which is about 40 kilometres (25 mi) to the northeast. The Naustdal Tunnel has its southern entrance at this village.

== History ==
The village was the administrative centre of the old Naustdal Municipality prior to its dissolution in 2020. Naustdal Church is located in this village. The village has been the site of a church since the Middle Ages.
