= Askrova =

Island in Vestland, Norway

- Interactive map of Askrova

Geography
- Location: Vestland, Norway
- Coordinates: 61.5145°N 4.9496°E
- Area: 7.8 km^{2} (3.0 sq mi)
- Length: 5 km (3.1 mi)
- Width: 2 km (1.2 mi)
- Highest elevation: 220 m (720 ft)
- Highest point: Skara

Administration
- Norway
- County: Vestland
- Municipality: Kinn Municipality

Demographics
- Population: 143 (2001)

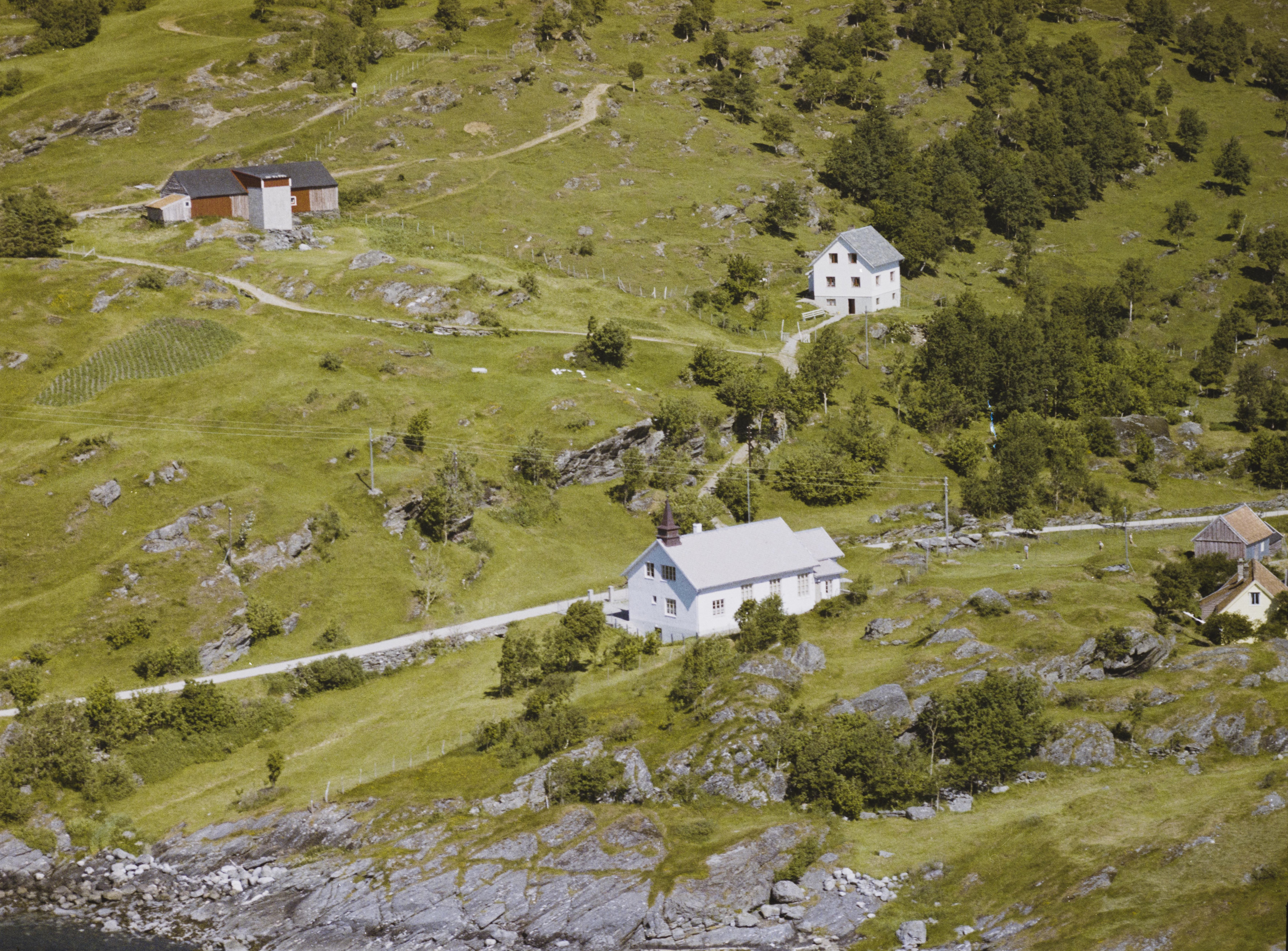
Askrova prayer house chapel.

Askrova is an island in Kinn Municipality in Vestland county, Norway. It is located along the Brufjorden, near the mouth of the Førdefjorden, about 4 kilometres (2.5 mi) northwest of the island of Svanøya. Askrova sits about 7 kilometres (4.3 mi) southwest of the town of Florø and about the same distance southeast of the island of Reksta.

The population of the 7.8-square-kilometre (3.0 sq mi) island (2001) was 143, with most residents living on the south and west shores of the island. The 219-metre (719 ft) tall mountain Skara is the highest point on the island. Askrova Chapel is located on the island.

The main industry for the island is fishing. In 1936, there was a record catch of herring at Askrova. Official figures put it at between 100,000 and 120,000 hectolitres (2,200,000 and 2,600,000 imp gal; 2,600,000 and 3,200,000 US gal) of herring. It was the biggest catch to date in Vestland county.

== See also ==
- List of islands of Norway
