= Helle, Sunnfjord =

Village in Sunnfjord Municipality, Norway

Helle Hella (unofficial)
- Village
- Interactive map of Helle
- Location within Vestland Location within Norway
- Coordinates: 61.46808°N 5.5481°E
- Country: Norway
- Region: Western Norway
- County: Vestland
- District: Sunnfjord
- Municipality: Sunnfjord Municipality
- Elevation: 86 m (282 ft)

Population (2001)
  - Total: 133
- Time zone: UTC+01:00 (CET)
  - Summer (DST): UTC+02:00 (CEST)
- Post Code: 6817 Naustdal

Helle is a village in Sunnfjord Municipality in Vestland county, Norway. It is located on the north side of the Førdefjorden, about 9 kilometres (5.6 mi) southeast of the village of Vevring and about 10 kilometres (6.2 mi) southwest of the village of Naustdal. The population of Helle (2001) was 133.
