= Naustdal Church =

Church in Vestland, Norway

- Naustdal kyrkje
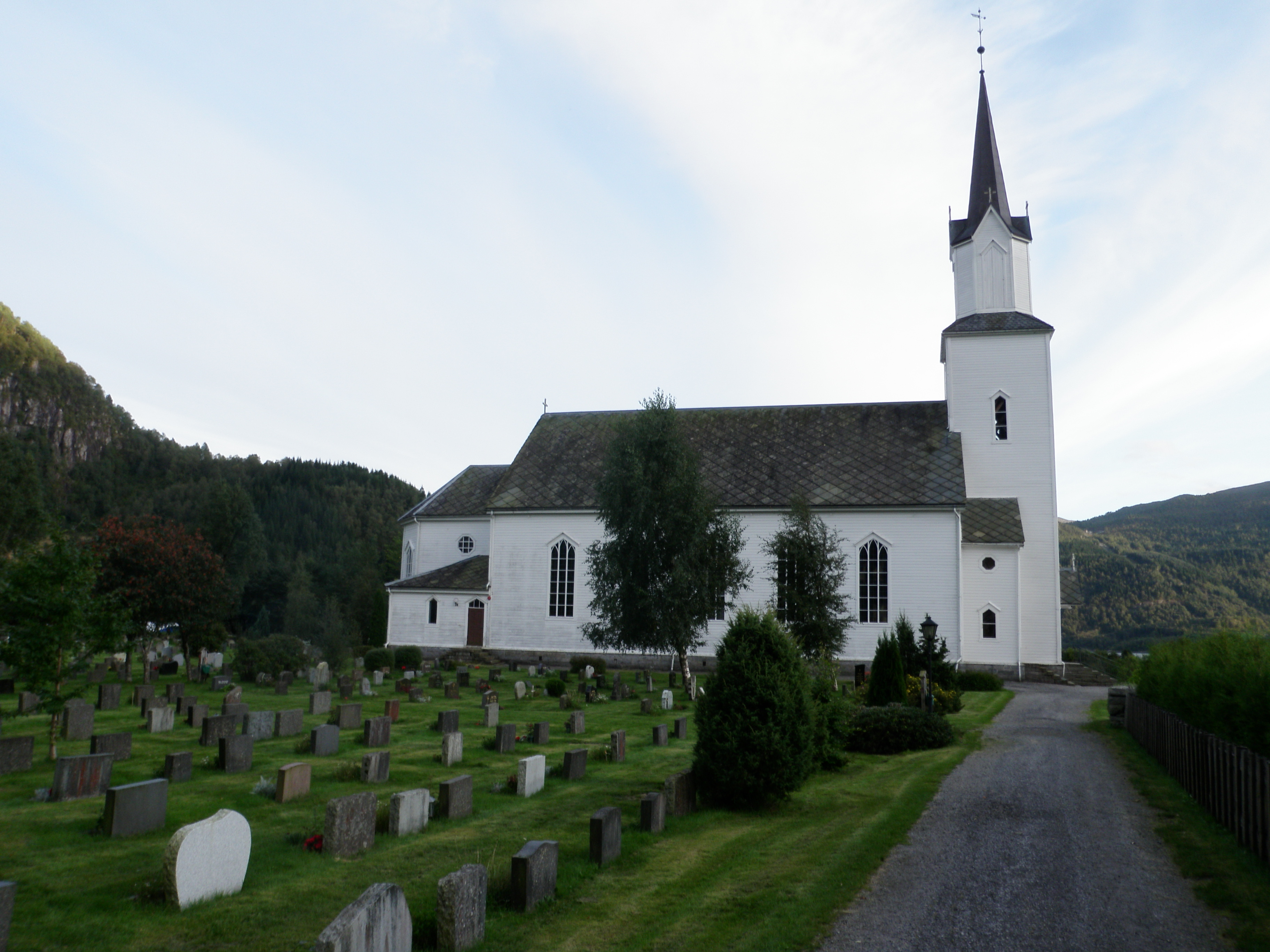
- View of the church
- Naustdal Church
- 61°30′32″N 5°43′00″E
- Location: Sunnfjord Municipality, Vestland
- Country: Norway
- Denomination: Church of Norway
- Previous denomination: Catholic Church
- Churchmanship: Evangelical Lutheran

History
- Status: Parish church
- Founded: c. 1150
- Consecrated: 9 September 1891

Architecture
- Functional status: Active
- Architect: Adolf Schirmer
- Architectural type: Long church
- Completed: 1891 (135 years ago)

Specifications
- Capacity: 650
- Materials: Wood

Administration
- Diocese: Bjørgvin bispedømme
- Deanery: Sunnfjord prosti
- Parish: Naustdal
- Norwegian Cultural Heritage Site
- Type: Church
- Status: Listed
- ID: 85096

Naustdal Church (Norwegian: Naustdal kyrkje) is a parish church of the Church of Norway in Sunnfjord Municipality in Vestland county, Norway. It is located in the village of Naustdal. It is one of two churches for the Naustdal parish which is part of the Sunnfjord prosti (deanery) in the Diocese of Bjørgvin. The white, wooden church was built in a long church style in 1891 by the architect Adolf Schirmer. The church seats about 650 people, making it the largest church in the whole Sunnfjord region, giving it the nickname "Sunnfjord Cathedral".

== History ==
The earliest existing historical records of the church date back to the year 1308, but the church was not new that year. The first church in Naustdal was a stone church that was likely built around the year 1150. The church had a rectangular nave that measured about 22.5 by 12.5 metres (74 ft × 41 ft) and a narrower, square, 7.5-by-7.5-metre (25 ft × 25 ft) chancel with a lower roof line. In the late Middle Ages, the choir was rebuilt so that it had the same width as the nave.

The old church was small and old and by the late 1800s, discussions were had on what to do with the centuries-old church. Some wanted to renovate it, others wanted a new, more modern church. In 1890, the old church was torn down and replaced on the same site with the present church. The arch from the choir of the old church was saved and is now used as an entrance gate to the church cemetery. Stone from the previous church was used to build the foundation of the present building as well. The new church was designed by Adolf Schirmer and the lead builders were Mons N. Skare and Jørgen L. Torsheim. The new church was consecrated on 9 September 1891 by the Bishop Fredrik W. Hvoslef.

== Media gallery ==
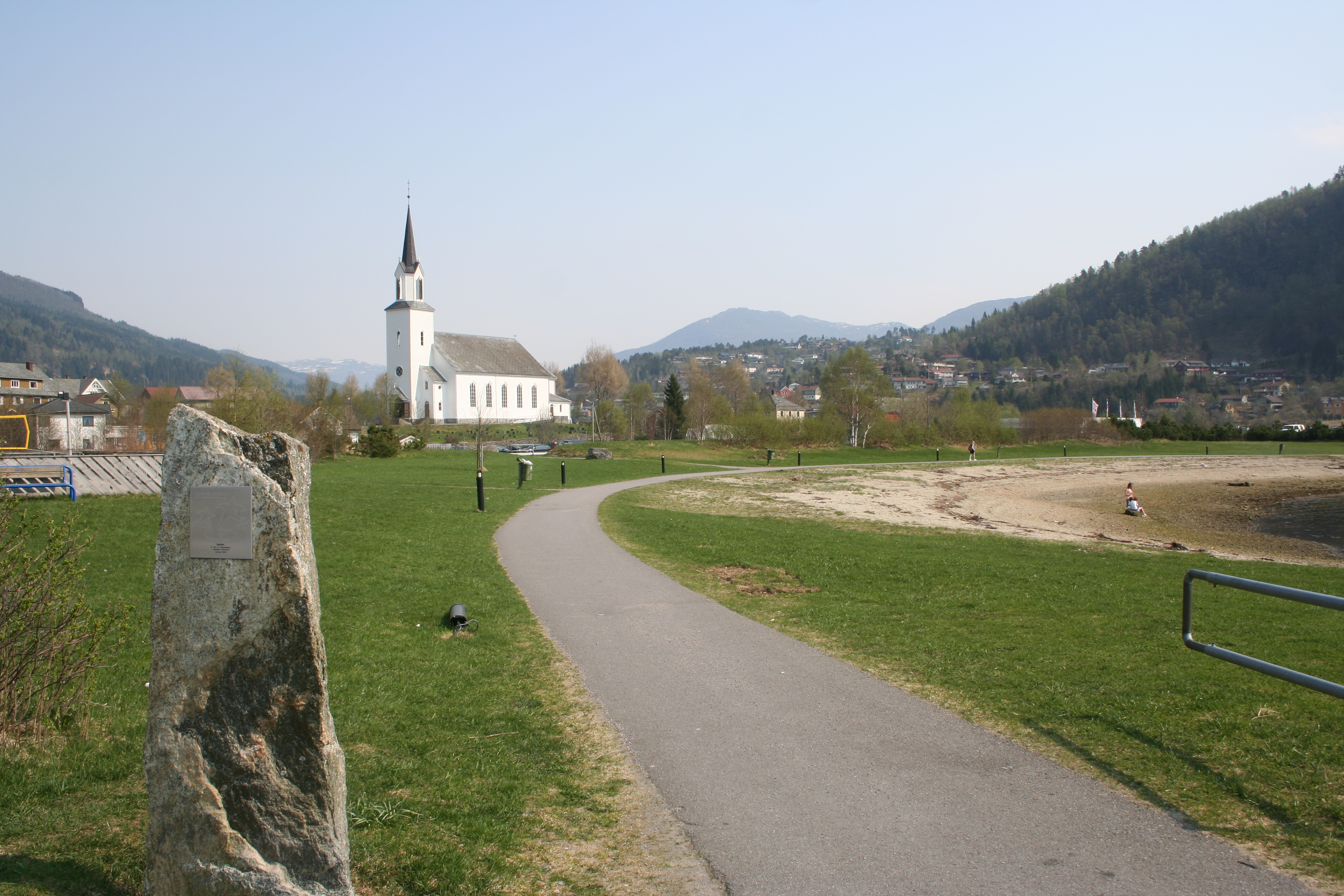

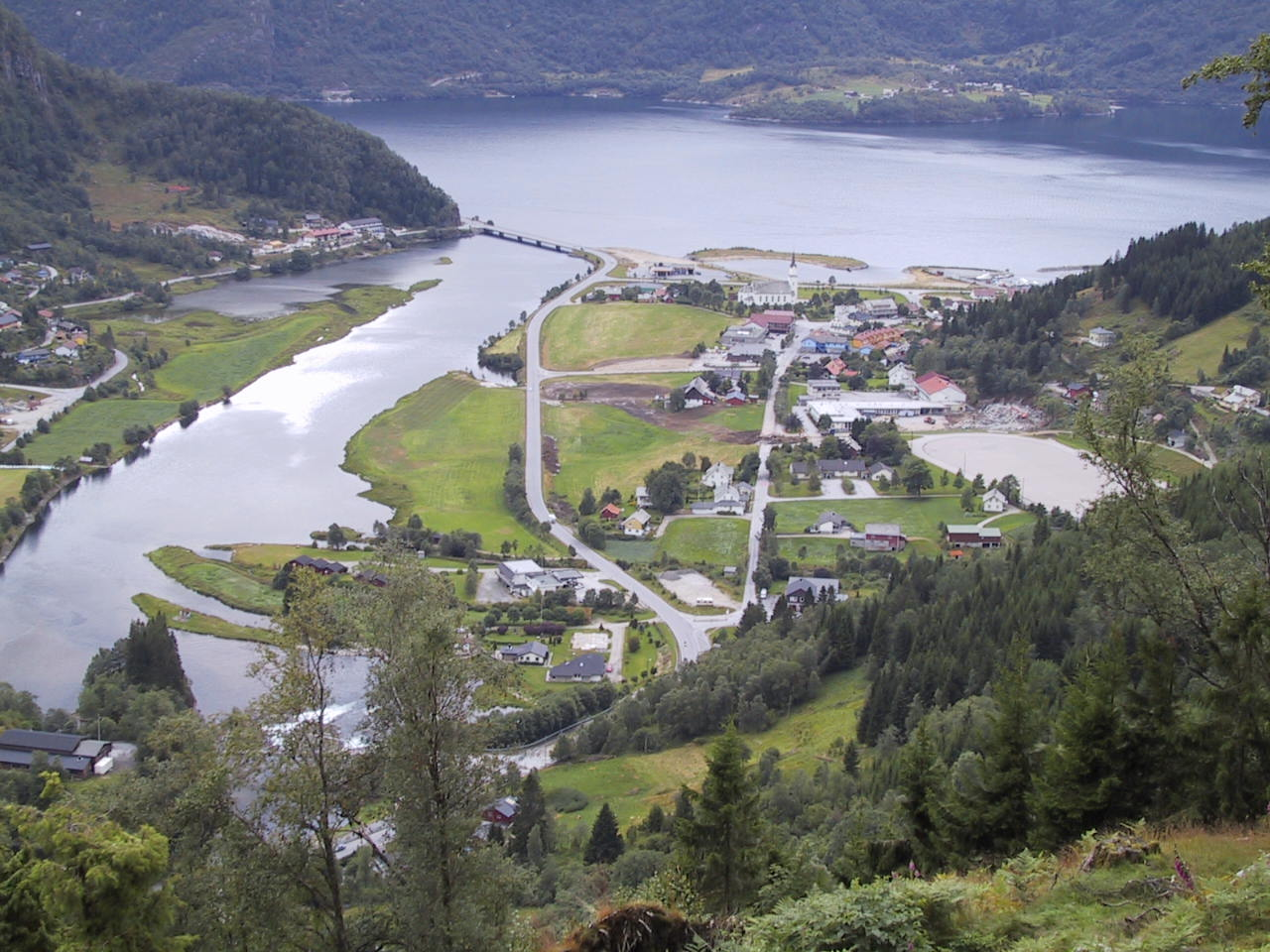

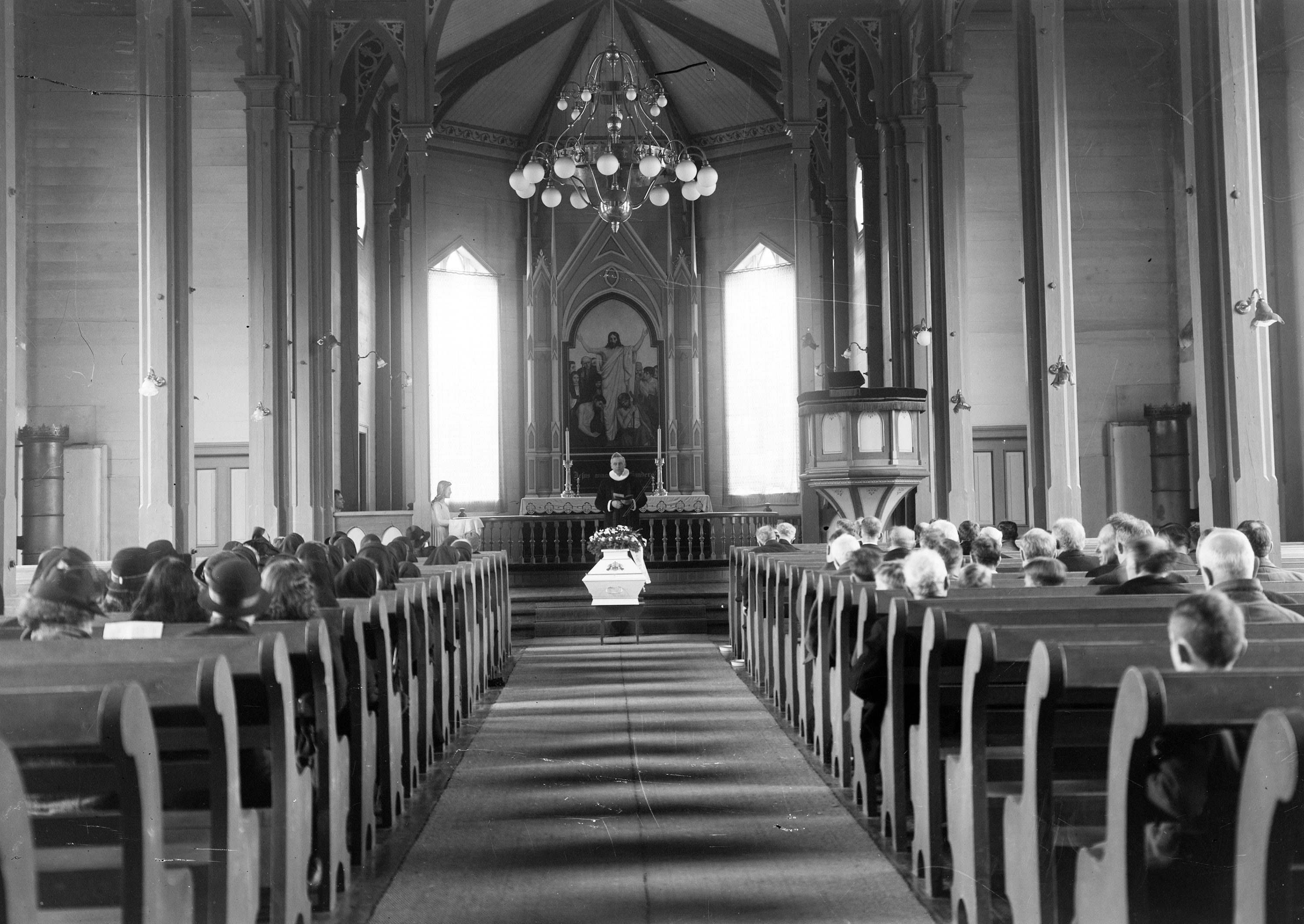

== See also ==
- List of churches in Bjørgvin
