= Naustdal Tunnel =

Road tunnel in Vestland, Norway

- Interactive map of Naustdal Tunnel

Overview
- Location: Vestland, Norway
- Coordinates: 61.5584°N 5.6778°E
- Status: Open
- Route: Rv5
- Start: Kinn Municipality
- End: Sunnfjord Municipality

Operation
- Work began: 7 June 1993
- Opened: 18 Aug 1995
- Traffic: Automotive

Technical
- Length: 5,970 metres (19,590 ft)
- No. of lanes: 2

The Naustdal Tunnel (Norwegian: Naustdalstunnelen) is a road tunnel connecting Kinn Municipality and Sunnfjord Municipality in Vestland county, Norway. The 5,970-metre (19,590 ft) long tunnel is part of the Norwegian National Road 5 highway which connects the towns of Florø and Førde by going through the Ramsdalsheia mountains. The northern end of the tunnel is located about 11 kilometres (6.8 mi) southeast of the village of Eikefjord and the southern end of the tunnel is located on the northern edge of the village of Naustdal.

Work on the tunnel began in 1993 to replace the old road that went over the mountains. The tunnel was opened on 18 August 1995. Originally, there was a toll station at the northern end of the tunnel which operated from 1995 until 2010. The toll station was closed permanently after collecting 250 million kr to pay off the debt.
