= Vevring Church =

Church in Vestland, Norway

- Vevring kyrkje
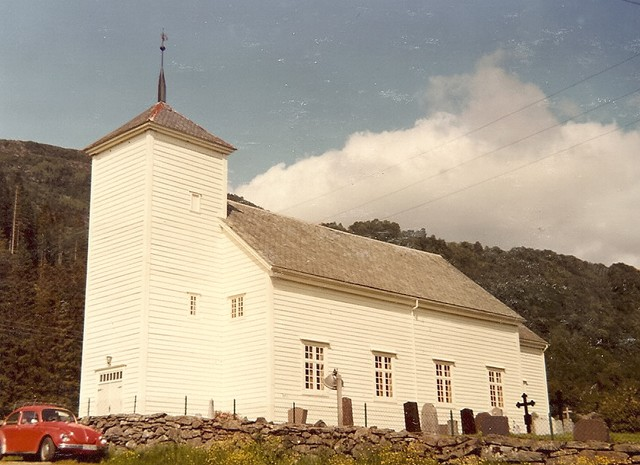
- View of the church
- Vevring Church
- 61°29′30″N 5°23′48″E
- Location: Sunnfjord Municipality, Vestland
- Country: Norway
- Denomination: Church of Norway
- Previous denomination: Catholic Church
- Churchmanship: Evangelical Lutheran

History
- Status: Parish church
- Founded: 12th century
- Consecrated: 16 September 1846

Architecture
- Functional status: Active
- Architect: Hans Linstow
- Architectural type: Long church
- Completed: 1846 (180 years ago)

Specifications
- Capacity: 225
- Materials: Wood

Administration
- Diocese: Bjørgvin bispedømme
- Deanery: Sunnfjord prosti
- Parish: Naustdal
- Norwegian Cultural Heritage Site
- Type: Church
- Status: Automatically protected
- ID: 85827

Vevring Church (Norwegian: Vevring kyrkje) is a parish church of the Church of Norway in Sunnfjord Municipality in Vestland county, Norway. It is located in the village of Indrevevring. It is one of two churches for the Naustdal parish which is part of the Sunnfjord prosti (deanery) in the Diocese of Bjørgvin. The white, wooden church was built in a long church style in 1846 by the architect Hans Linstow. The church seats about 225 people.

== History ==
The earliest existing historical records of the church date back to the year 1330, but the church was not new at that time. The first church in Vevring was likely a wooden stave church that was built during the 12th century. During the 1600s, the church was renovated and expanded. A new timber-framed nave was added on to the old church. The old nave was converted into the choir of the church and the old choir was torn down and its materials were used to build a church porch. After the renovation, the nave measured 15 by 9.5 metres (49 ft × 31 ft) with a choir measuring 5.6 by 6.9 metres (18 ft × 23 ft). In the 1770s, part of the church collapsed and had to be rebuilt.

In 1846, the church was torn down and replaced with a new church which stands on the same site. The new church was designed by Hans Linstow and the lead builders were Jakob Høyvik and Bendix Johannesen. The new church was consecrated on 16 September 1846 by the local dean, Johan Grønn Lund. In 1944–1950, the church was enlarged by the architect Lars Gjelsvik including small extensions to the choir and sacristy as well as rebuilding the second floor seating gallery. Electric lighting was also installed during this renovation. After this renovation, the nave measured about 16.8 by 9.5 metres (55 ft × 31 ft) and the choir measured about 5 by 6.5 metres (16 ft × 21 ft). It wasn't until 1969 that the church received electric heating. In 1988, the church porch was enlarged to include a small kitchen and bathroom.

== See also ==
- List of churches in Bjørgvin
