= Førde Fjord =

Fjord in western Norway

Førde Fjord Førdefjorden (Norwegian)
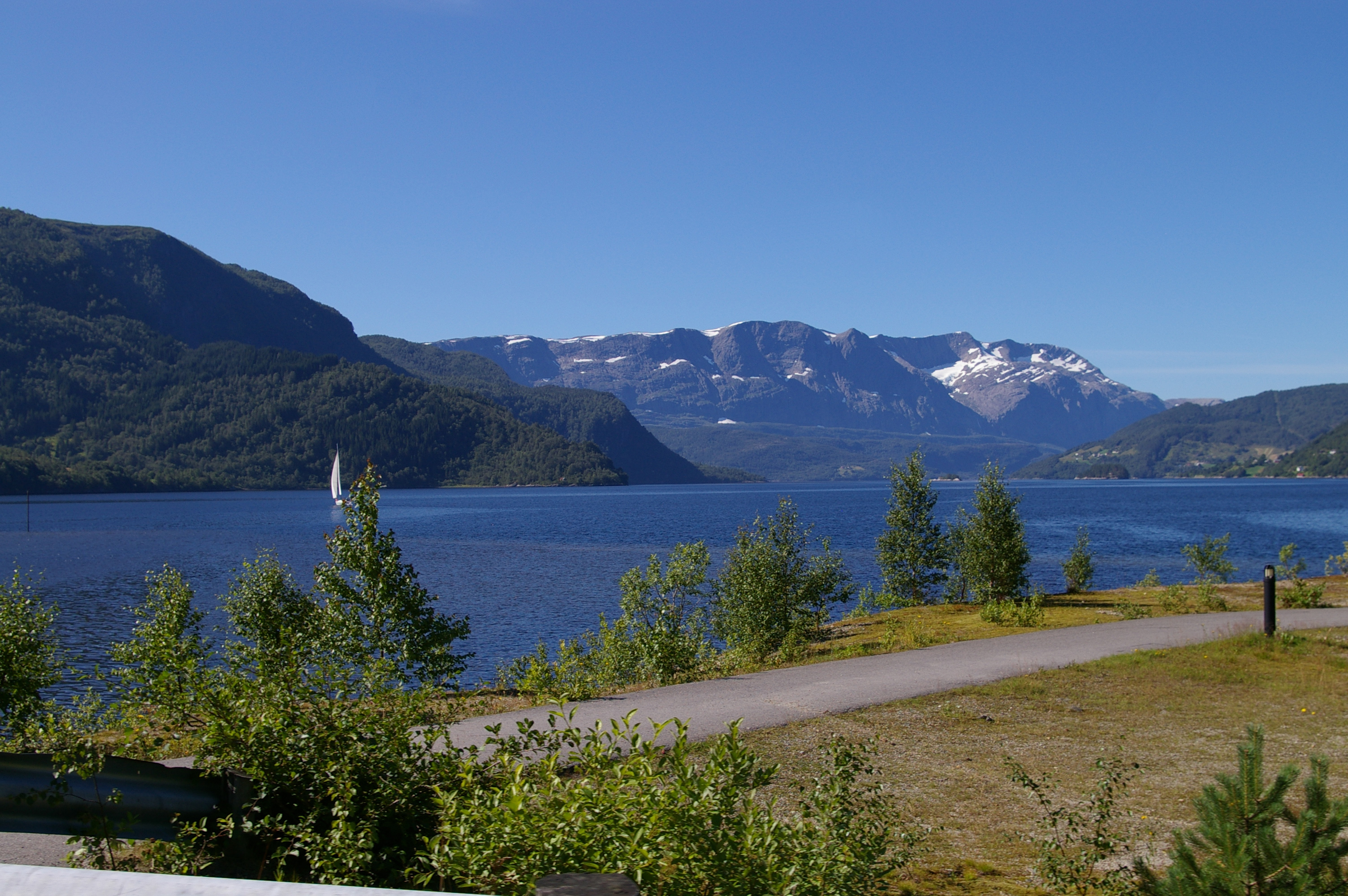
- View of the fjord
- Interactive map of the fjord
- Location: Sunnfjord, Vestland
- Coordinates: 61.45°N 5.50°E
- Primary inflows: River Jølstra
- Primary outflows: Brufjorden / Stavfjorden
- Basin countries: Norway
- Max. length: 36 km (22 mi)
- Max. width: 2 km (1.2 mi)
- Settlements: Førde, Naustdal

Førde Fjord (English) or Førdefjorden (Norwegian) is a fjord in Vestland county, Norway. It is the longest of all the fjords in the traditional district of Sunnfjord. Førdefjorden passes through Sunnfjord Municipality, Askvoll Municipality, and Kinn Municipality. The fjord begins at the town of Førde, at the estuary of the river Jølstra, which comes from the lake Jølstravatn. The island of Svanøya lies just outside the mouth of the fjord. There are roads along the shoreline on both the north and south sides of the fjord, and the European route E39 highway runs past the town of Førde, near the fjord.

== Mining industry ==
Nordic Mining applied to deposit 6 tonnes (5.9 long tons; 6.6 short tons) of tailings a year for 50 years into the fjord, prompting much opposition. In May 2022, permission was granted; however, an operations plan [has not yet been approved] by Directorate of Mining (as of Q2 2022).

As of 2021, Nordic Mining is permitted to dump 9 tonnes (8.9 long tons; 9.9 short tons) of chemical waste into the fjord per year, including 2 tonnes (2.0 long tons; 2.2 short tons) of SIBX (sodium isobutyl xanthate).

As of January 2024, after a 15-year dispute, Nordic Mining has been given the go-ahead to dispose of 170 megatonnes (170,000,000 long tons; 190,000,000 short tons) of mining waste at the bottom of the Førdefjorden. Before this, the government had won a court case against environmental organisations who had tried to block the disposal.

In Q4 2025, the appellate court system ruled that the permit for discharges, is not valid. The mine is in operation, and during Spring of 2026, the supreme court has been scheduled to hear the case about permit for discharges.

== Settlements ==
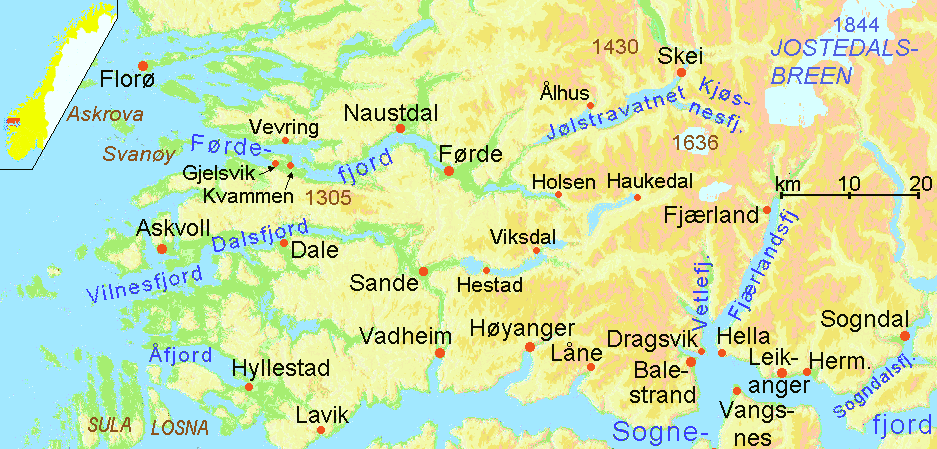
Map of the area

The following settlements are located along the Førdefjorden:

- Stavang (in Kinn Municipality), on the north side, at the mouth of the fjord
- Kvammen (in Askvoll Municipality), on the south side, near the mouth of the fjord
- Indrevevring (in Sunnfjord Municipality), on the north side, a little ways into the fjord
- Helle (in Sunnfjord Municipality), on the north side, about the middle of the fjord
- Naustdal (in Sunnfjord Municipality), on the north side, near the inner part of the fjord
- Førde (the administrative centre of Sunnfjord Municipality), at the innermost part of the fjord

== Media gallery ==
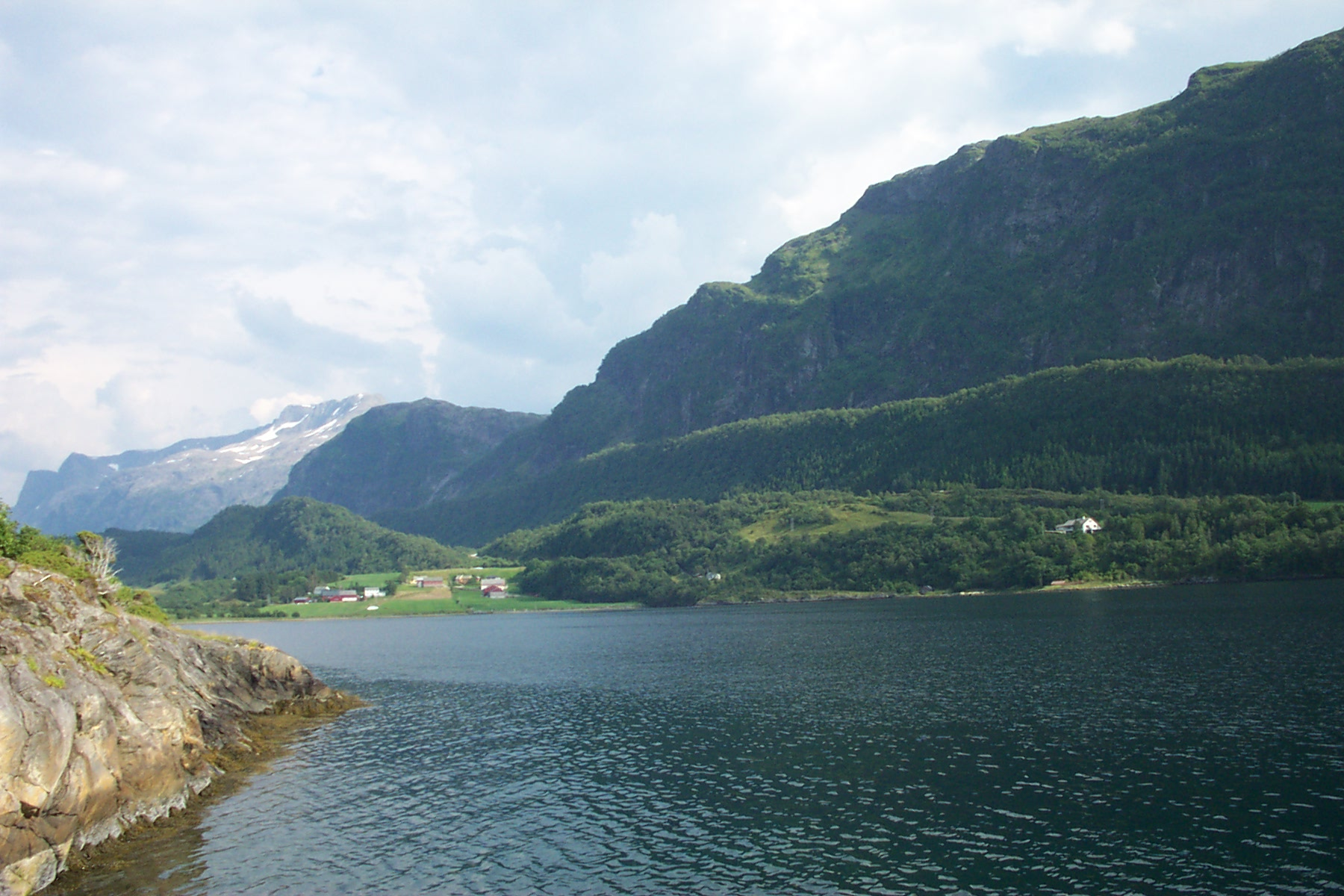
Gjelsvik by Førdefjorden

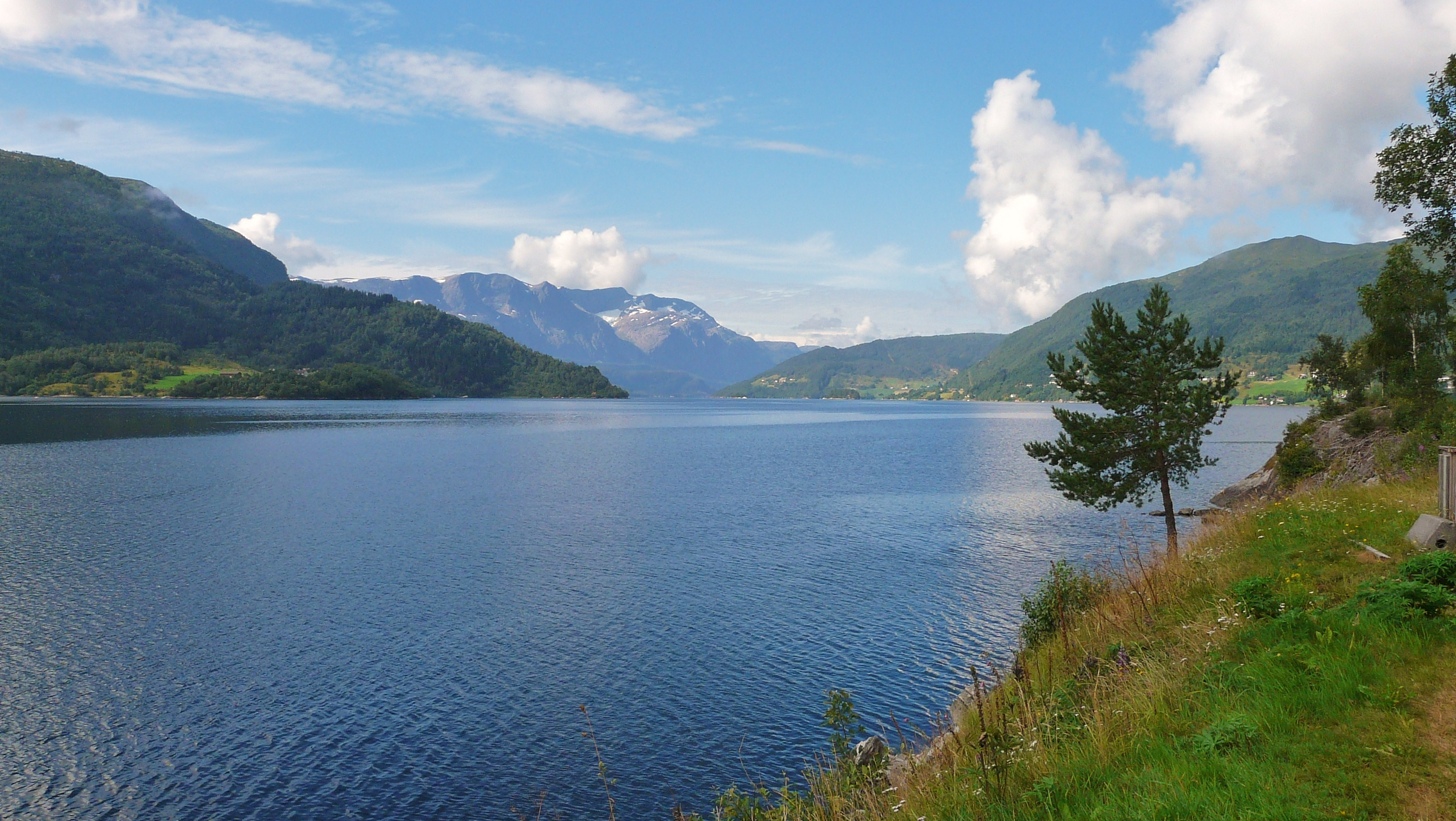
View of Førdefjorden towards southwest

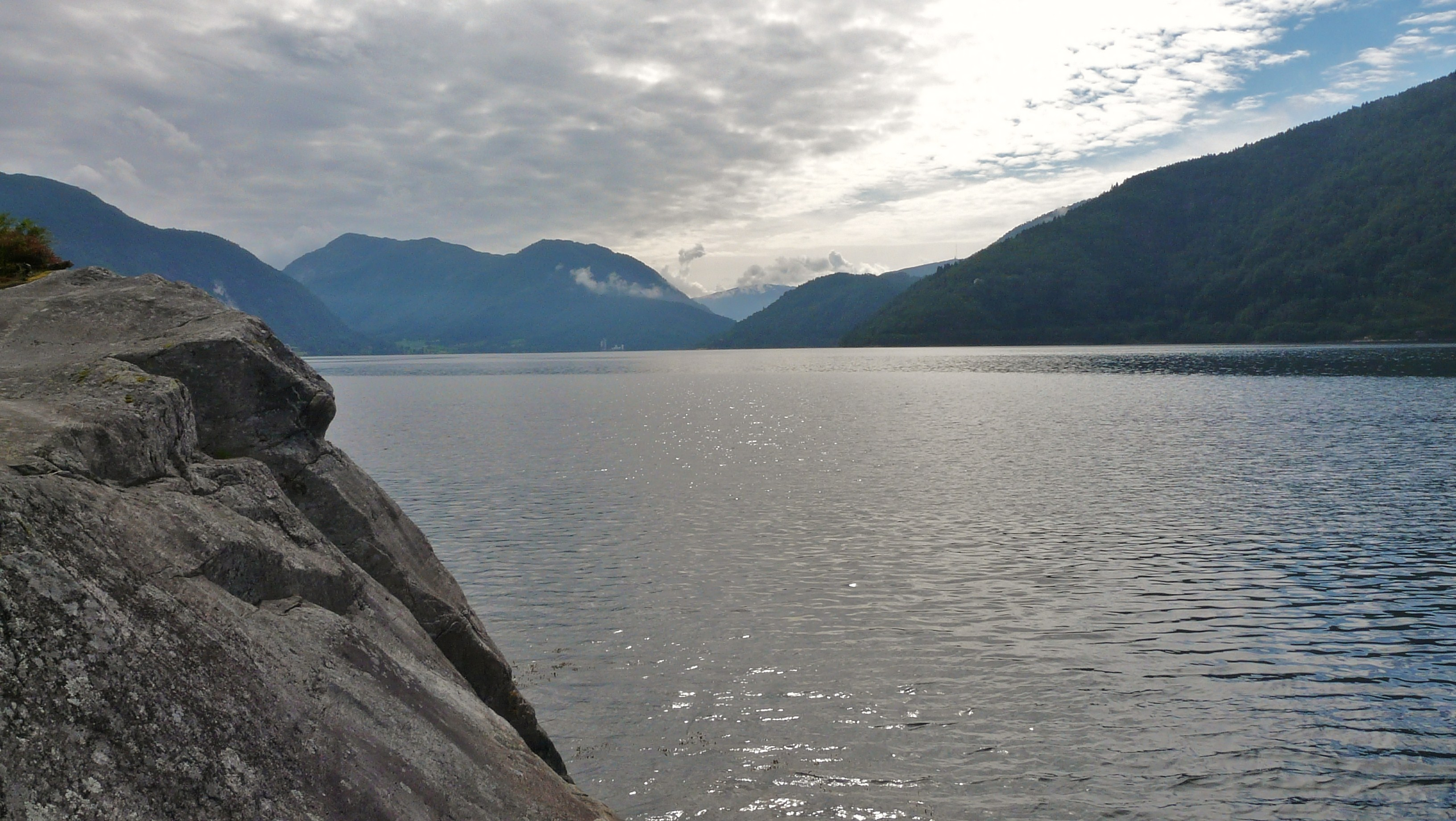
View of Førdefjorden towards southeast

== See also ==
- List of Norwegian fjords
