= Kinn Church =

Church in Vestland, Norway

- Kinn kyrkje
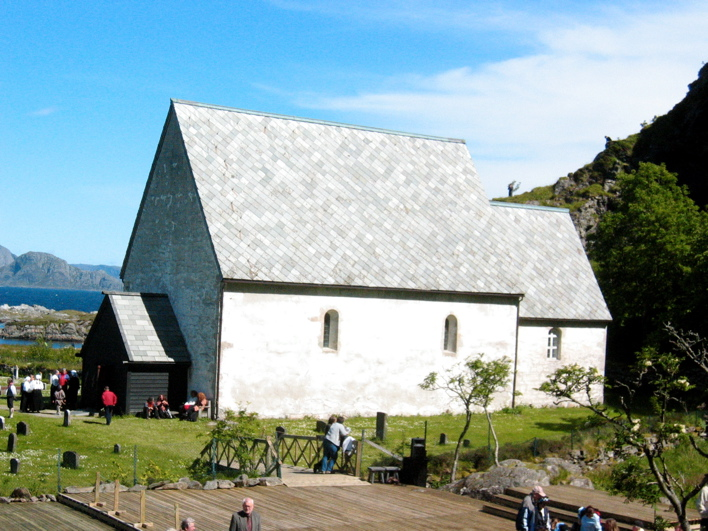
- View of the church
- Kinn Church
- 61°33′59″N 4°45′27″E
- Location: Kinn Municipality, Vestland
- Country: Norway
- Denomination: Church of Norway
- Previous denomination: Catholic Church
- Churchmanship: Evangelical Lutheran

History
- Status: Parish church
- Founded: 12th century

Architecture
- Functional status: Active
- Architectural type: Long church
- Style: Romanesque style
- Completed: c. 1150 (876 years ago)

Specifications
- Materials: Stone

Administration
- Diocese: Bjørgvin bispedømme
- Deanery: Sunnfjord prosti
- Parish: Kinn
- Norwegian Cultural Heritage Site
- Type: Church
- Status: Automatically protected
- ID: 84773

Kinn Church (Norwegian: Kinn kyrkje) is a parish church of the Church of Norway in Kinn Municipality in Vestland county, Norway. It is located on the small island of Kinn. It is one of two churches for the Kinn parish which is part of the Sunnfjord prosti (deanery) in the Diocese of Bjørgvin. The white, stone church was built in a long church design in the middle of the 12th century using plans drawn up by an unknown architect.

It is the oldest and the only church of its kind in the Sunnfjord region, and it is one of the most impressive medieval monuments in Western Norway. It was the main church in the parish of Kinn Municipality until 1882, when the new Florø Church was built in the newly founded town of Florø. Since that time, the old stone church was taken out of regular use and it mostly used as a museum, although it is still used for special occasions.

== History ==
The earliest existing written historical records of the church date back to the year 1322, but it was not new that year. The church at Kinn was first built during the second half of the 12th century. The Romanesque style building was constructed out of a type of sandstone from the island of Skorpa. It has as a rectangular nave and narrower, nearly square chancel. According to tradition, the church was established by Borni, the sister to Saint Sunniva who is the patron saint of the Diocese of Bjørgvin. Borni was said to have lived in a cave in the mountain that lies just south of the church site. Archaeological dating shows that the chancel was likely built around the mid-12th century and the nave was built a few decades later.

In 1814, this church served as an election church (Norwegian: valgkirke). Together with more than 300 other parish churches across Norway, it was a polling station for elections to the 1814 Norwegian Constituent Assembly which wrote the Constitution of Norway. This was Norway's first national elections. Each church parish was a constituency that elected people called "electors" who later met together in each county to elect the representatives for the assembly that was to meet at Eidsvoll Manor later that year.

In 1868–1869, the church was renovated, including larger windows and lower roof angles. These changes were reversed in 1911–1912 when the roof was rebuilt to match the historical design. Also at that time, the church porch was demolished and rebuilt. Some of the interior was also rebuilt in the 1911 reconstruction.

== Building ==
Currently, Kinn Church is used only during the summer months. The church itself is built in a Romanesque style with Roman-arched windows and doors. The municipality of Kinn bought the church in 1866, and in 1868–69, major repair work was carried out. Another restoration was carried out in 1911–12. The most recent restoration work was completed in the late 1960s.

The "lectorium" constitutes the oldest part of the church. Research has shown that it most likely was built in the mid-13th century, and the wooden reliefs have been carved by artists at the royal court in Bergen at the time of Håkon Håkonson. It is considered to be one of the finest gems from Norwegian medieval art.

The altar in the chancel is made of soapstone, and in the stone slab on top there is a small hole covered with a marble lid. This is where the holy objects and relics were hidden. The three saint figures in the triptych on the south wall in the chancel are made in the Netherlands, perhaps a gift to the church in the early 16th century. At Kinn, these figures have been renamed Ingebjørg, Borni, and Sunniva, all linked to local legends. The altarpiece was built in 1644, probably by Peter Negelsen who made altarpieces and other religious objects of art for many churches in this country.

== Media gallery ==
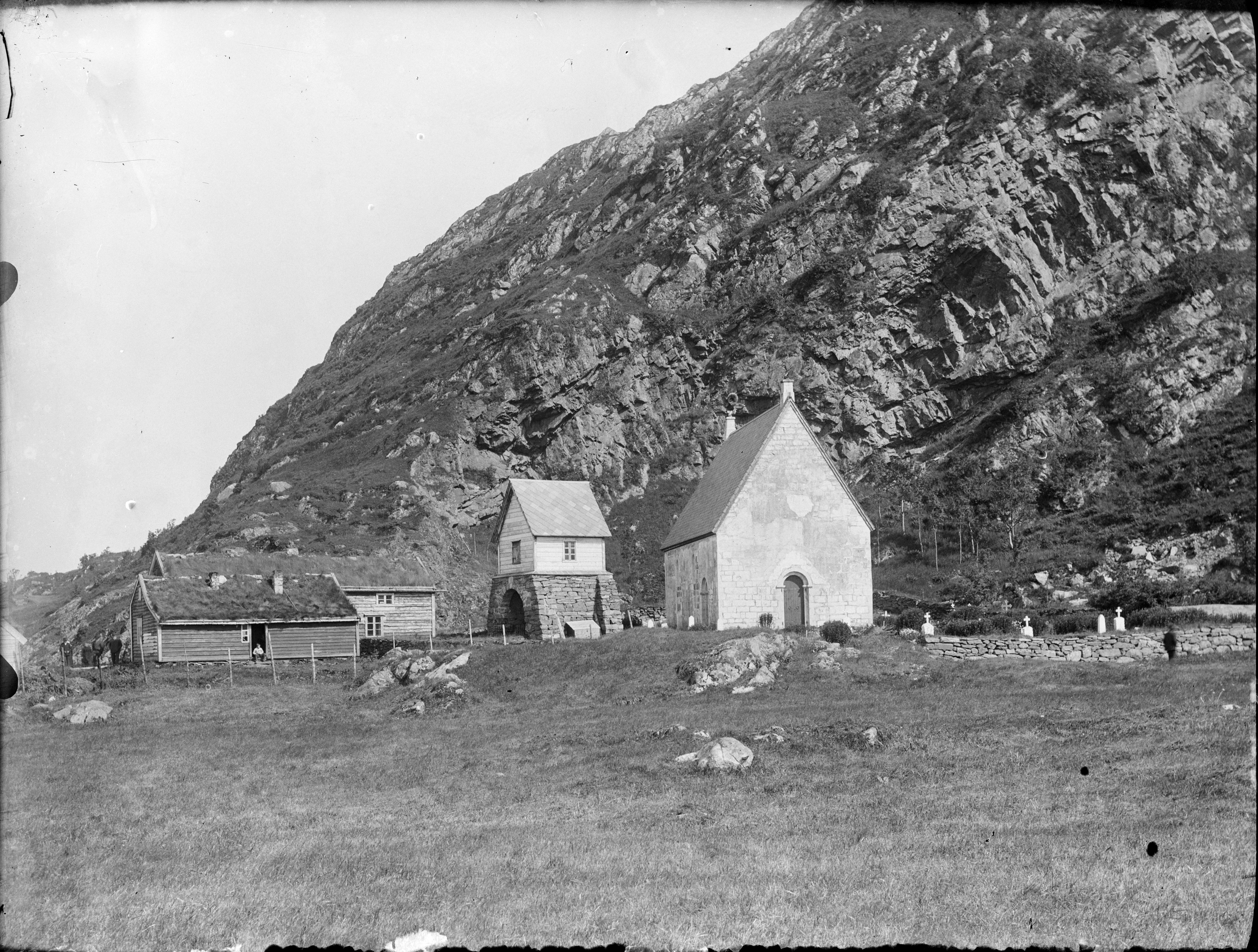

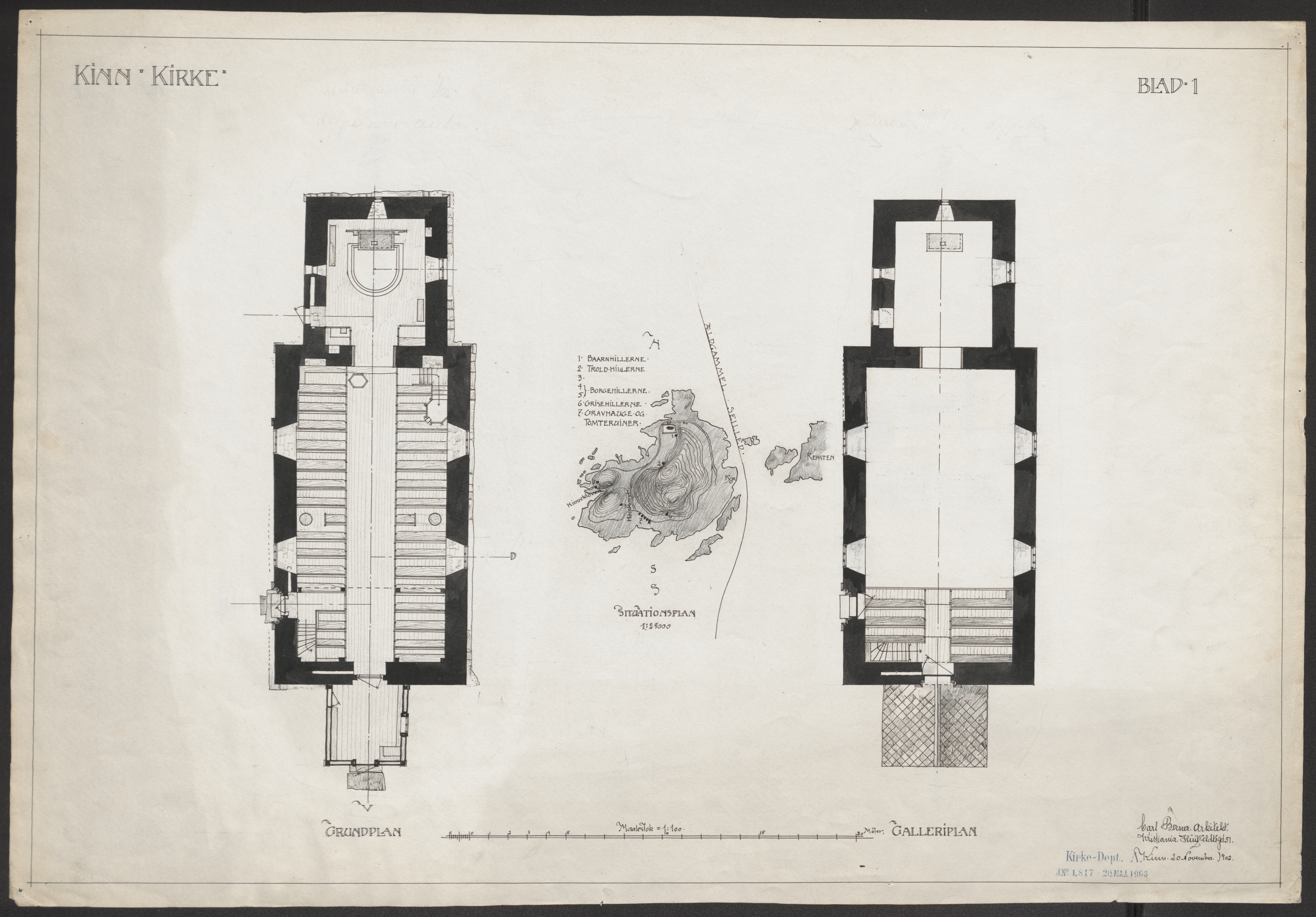

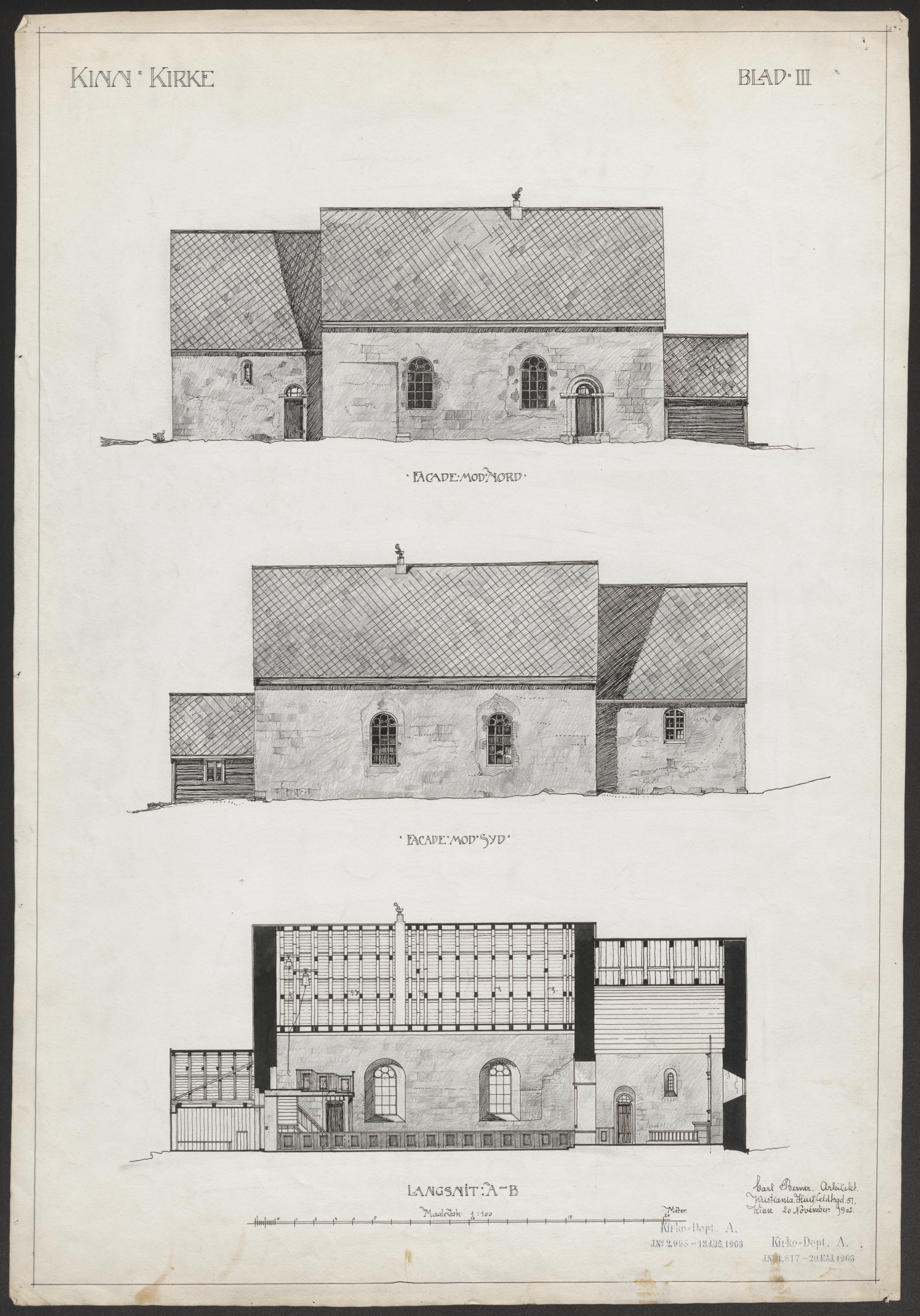

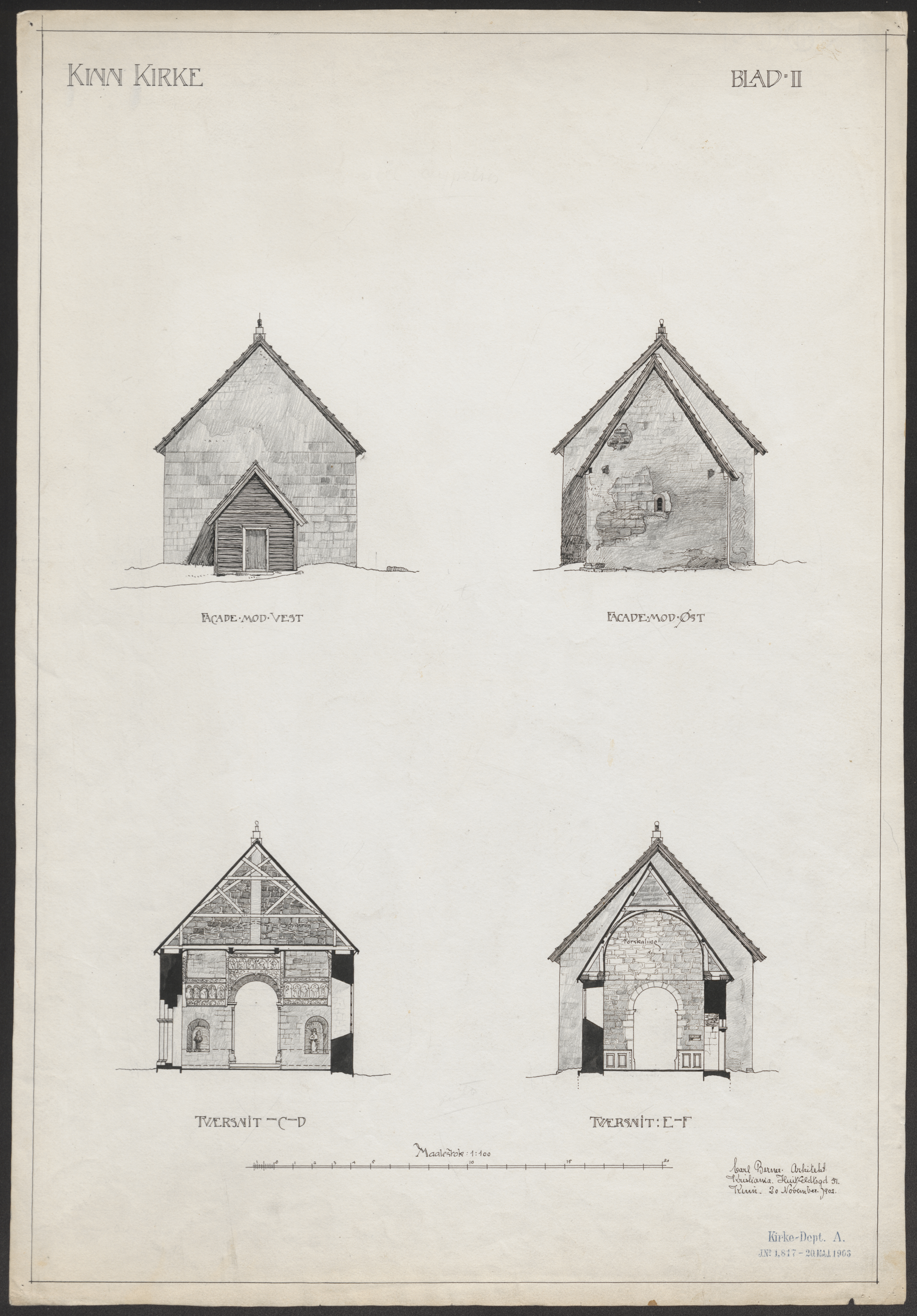

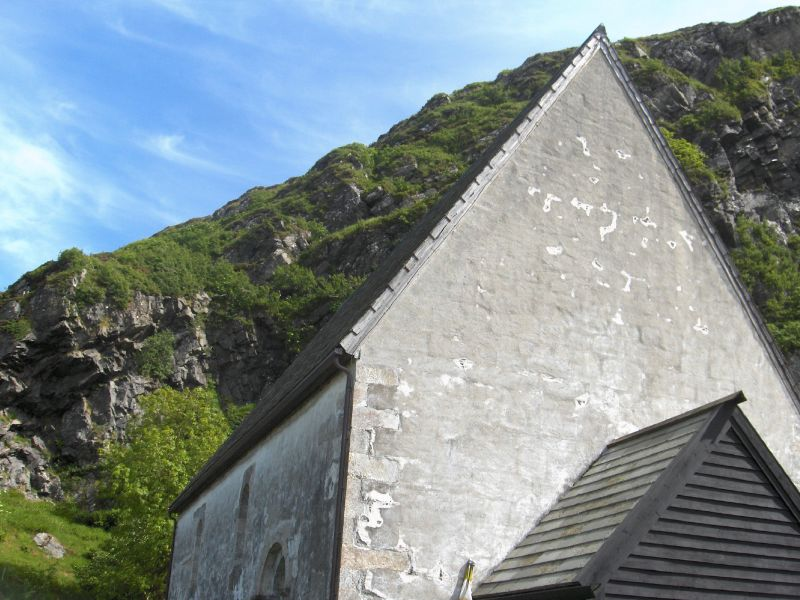

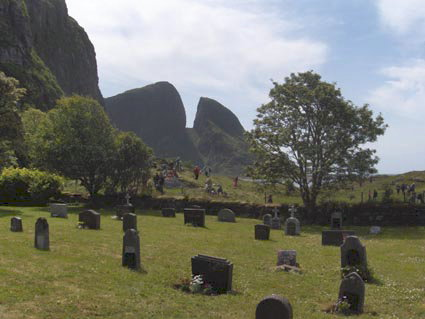

== See also ==
- List of churches in Bjørgvin
