= Sunniva (given name) =

Sunniva is in use as a feminine given name in Norway.

Sunniva is the Latinized form from Acta sanctorum in Selio. It has sometimes been rendered into Old Norse with the spelling Sunnifa. Both are renditions of the Old English name Sunngifu, Sunnigifu, from sunne, 'sun', and gifu, 'gift'. The Old English name is on record in the Yorkshire Domesday Book, as Sonneuæ.

Modern forms of the name include Synnøve, Synøve, Sønneva, Sønneve, Sunneva, Synneva, Synneve, all given in Norway, but Synnøve being the most widespread (also adopted as Synnöve in Sweden), with 5021 Norwegian women called Synnøve recorded in 2015. The popularity of the name surged in the early 20th century, with a peak of close to 0.7% of given girls' names during the 1920s. Since the 1920s, its popularity has declined steadily, falling below 0.1% by the 2000s. The original name Sunniva and the short form Synne, however, has instead become the most popularly given forms of this name. Sunniva has been in use since medieval times, but was unusual in the period 1900-1970, while Synne originated in the 1960s. Both started to become more popular in the 1970s and peaked around year 2000; in that year, Sunniva was the 33rd and Synne the 36th most popular names for newborn girls (each at ca. 0.6% of girl's names). They have since then declined to around 0.2%.

== People ==
- Sunniva Austigard Petersen (born 2003), Norwegian footballer
- Sunniva Flakstad Ihle (born 1983), Norwegian politician
- Sunniva Gylver (born 1967), Norwegian Lutheran theologian and bishop
- Sunniva Hakestad Møller (1907–1995), Norwegian politician
- Sunniva Hofstad (born 2004), Norwegian boxer
- Sunniva Næs Andersen (born 1996), Norwegian professional handball player
- Sunniva Ørstavik (born 1967), Norwegian civil servant
- Sunniva Skoglund (born 2002), Norwegian footballer
- Sunniva Sorby, expeditioner, historian, guide, citizen scientist

== See also ==
- Sunniva (crustacean), arthropod genus
- St Sunniva School, an independent Roman Catholic school located in the centre of Oslo, Norway
- SS St. Sunniva, one of the first purpose-built cruise ships
