= Batalden =

Batalden may refer to:

- 20309 Batalden, a main-belt asteroid
- Batalden (Vestland), a group of islands in Vestland, Norway
- Batalden Chapel, a chapel of the Church of Norway in Vestland, Norway
