= Sunniva =

Norwegian saint

Saint Sunniva
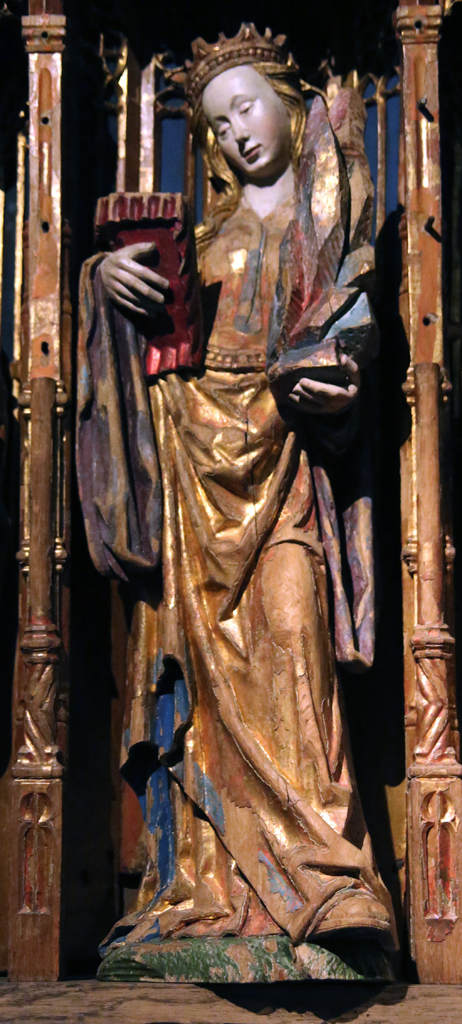
- Late Gothic sculpture of Saint Sunniva from the Austevoll altarpiece (c. 1520, now in Bergen Museum).
- Born: Ireland
- Died: 10th century Selja island, Norway
- Venerated in: Roman Catholic Church Eastern Orthodox Church True Orthodox Church
- Major shrine: Selje Abbey
- Feast: July 8
- Patronage: Diocese of Bjørgvin; Vestlandet

Saint Sunniva (10th century; Old Norse: Sunnifa, from Old English Sunngifu) is the patron saint of the Norwegian Church of Norway Diocese of Bjørgvin, as well as all of Western Norway.

Sunniva was venerated alongside her brother Alban, who in Norwegian tradition was identified with Saint Alban, the Roman-era British saint.

== Legend ==
Acta sanctorum in Selio is a Latin hagiography of saints Alban and Sunniva and their companions. It is believed to have been composed shortly after 1170. Oddr Snorrason made use of it in his Óláfs saga Tryggvasonar, in a section known as Albani þáttr ok Sunnifu ("tale of Alban and Sunniva") and also as Seljumanna þáttr. Oddr's original work was composed in Latin but only survives in an Old Icelandic translation. The legend was also included in the later compilation Óláfs saga Tryggvasonar en mesta. The tale is directly based on that in Acta sanctorum in Selio, and thus slightly younger, although likely still belonging to the 12th century.

According to the legend, Sunniva was the heir of an Irish kingdom, but had to flee when an invading heathen king wanted to marry her. She and her brother Alban (post-Reformation accounts add two sisters, called Borni and Marita) and their followers settle the previously uninhabited islands of Selja and Kinn in Norway during the rule of the pagan Jarl Hákon Sigurðarson (r. 962–995). Their Norwegian neighbors on the mainland suspect the Christians of stealing sheep and complain to Jarl Hákon. Hákon arrives on Selja with a group of armed men, intending to kill the inhabitants. When the Christians realize what is happening they hide in caves on the island and pray to God to collapse the caves to spare them from being ravaged by Hákon and his men. The caves collapse and kill all the Irishmen.

The legend has two farmers, Tord Eigileivsson and Tord Jorunsson who anchored at Selja to spend the night on a journey to Trondheim, witnessing a supernatural light over the island and discovering a bleached skull with a sweet smell. Arriving in Trondheim, the two men tell their experience to Olaf Tryggvason and bishop Sigurd. After another account of similar events by a different witness, the king and bishop travelled to Selja and found many sweet-smelling bones. They excavated the cave and recovered the body of Saint Sunniva incorrupt and looking as if the saint were asleep. The bones were collected and placed in a casket, and the body of Sunniva was placed in timber shrine.

== Relics and veneration ==
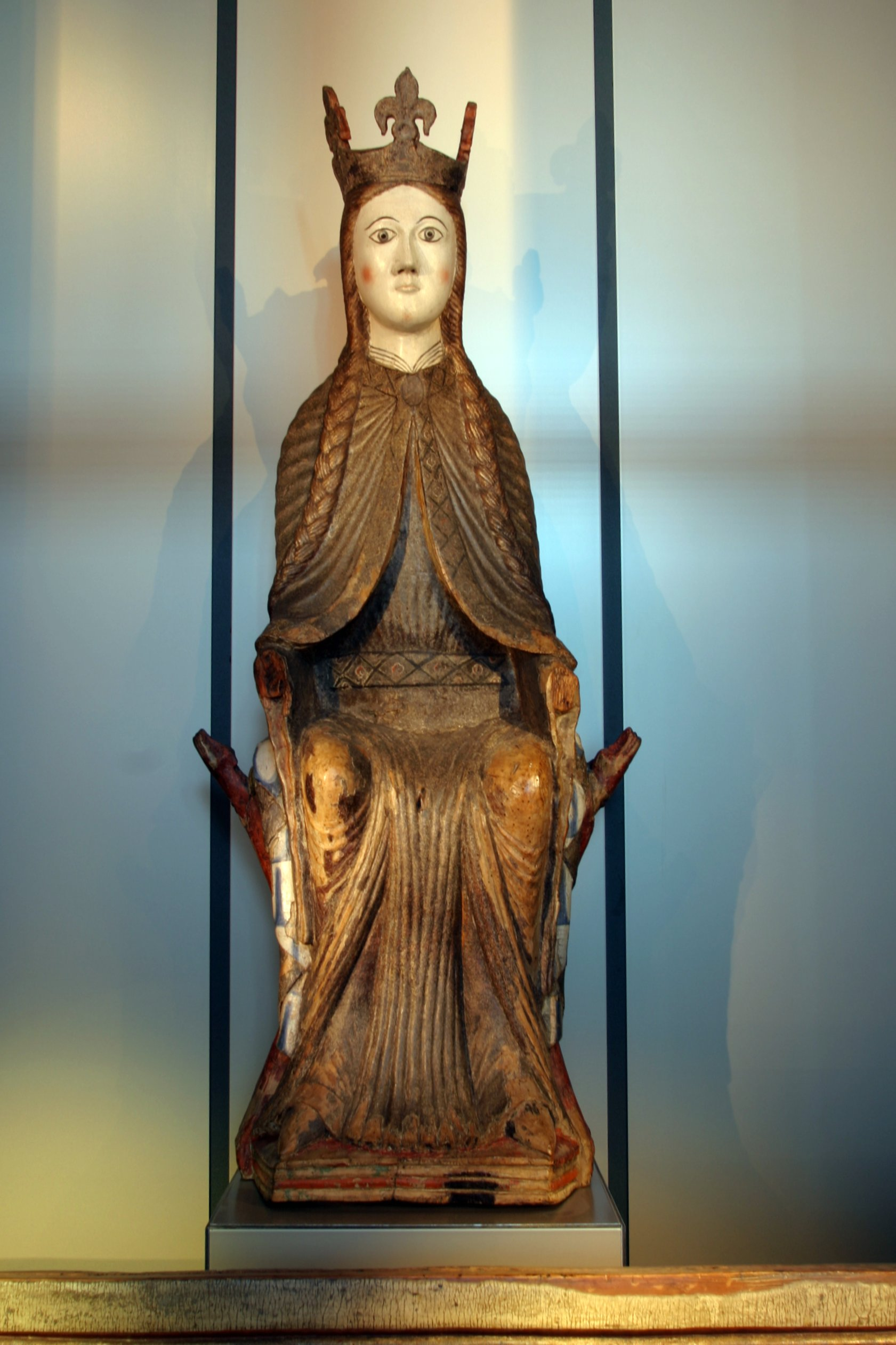
Medieval statue (dated c. 1200) of a seated woman wearing a crown, from Urnes Stave Church (now kept by Bergen Museum). It is interpreted as either a Madonna or as a depiction of St. Sunniva.

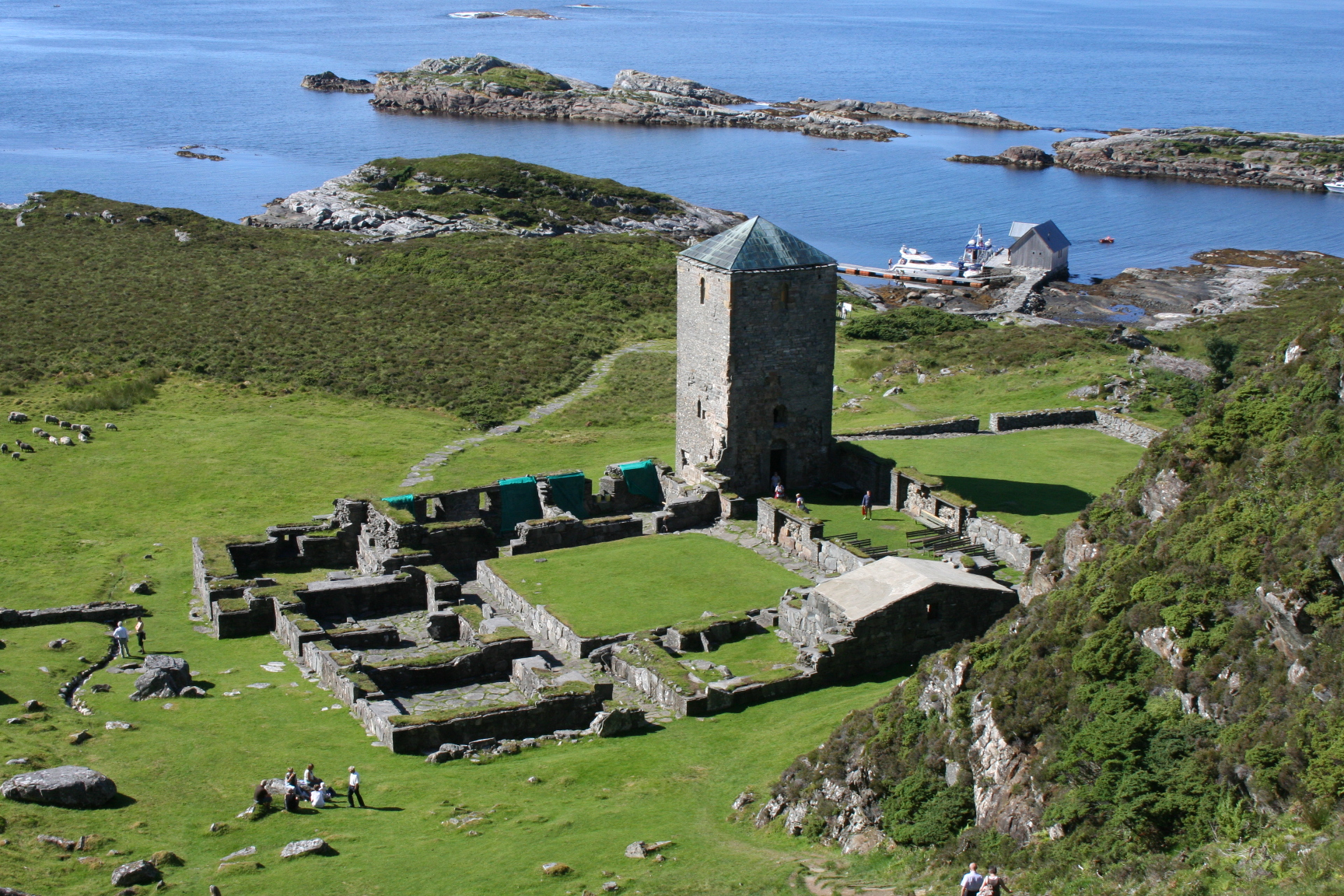
Ruins of Selja Abbey

The Benedictine Selja Abbey was built at the site around 1100 and dedicated to Saint Alban (the third-century British saint, who in medieval Scandinavian tradition became conflated with the 10th-century Irish saint at Selje); the local veneration of Sunniva can be traced to about that time, possibly influenced by that of Saint Ursula and the 11,000 virgins, but was at first subordinate to that of her brother. However, the original dedication to Alban at Selje may not have been to the British saint, but a German saint of the same name. Rekdal (2004) draws further connections of the legend to early medieval Norse-Gaelic contact, especially to St. Donnan, whose legend gives an account of the saint and his brothers being killed by pagans on the island of Eigg in 617.

Sunniva's relics (allegedly again found incorrupt) were moved to the new cathedral in Bergen in 1170, and as a result, her veneration spread throughout Norway. During the fires in Bergen of 1170/71 and of 1198 the relics of Sunniva were taken from the cathedral and set down at Sandbru. This reportedly halted the advance of the fire and was hailed as a miracle. The shrine with her relics remained in Bergen's Christ Church until 1531, when the church was demolished in the turmoils of the Reformation, and the shrine was transferred to Munkeliv monastery. The shrine was lost when that monastery was destroyed in its turn in 1536.

The feast day of Alban and Sunniva and their companions, known as Seljumannamesse, is 8 July. Sunniva also has a separate feast day commemorating her translation to Bergen in 1170, on either 31 August or 7 September.

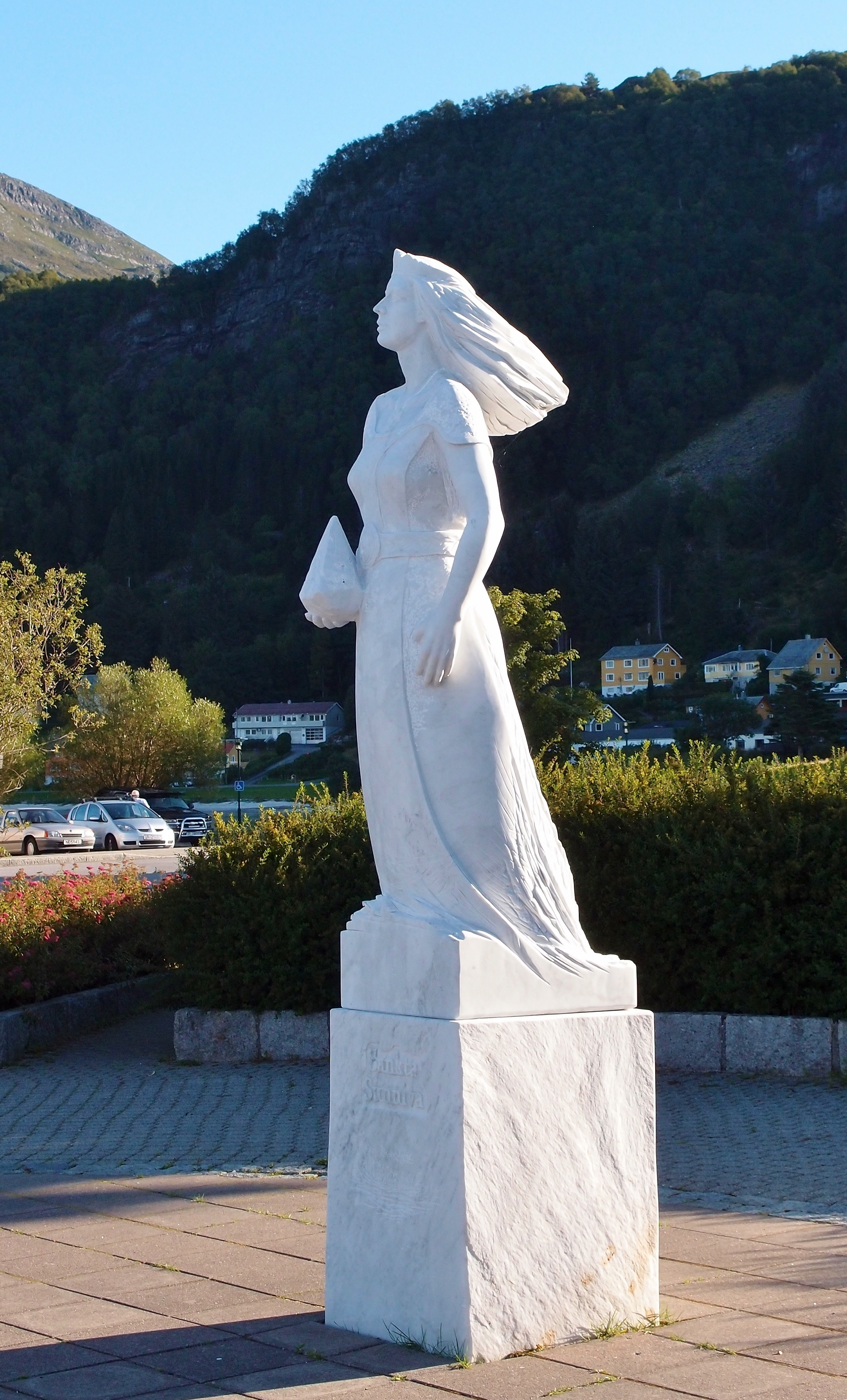
Statue of Saint Sunniva at the harbour of Selje

Norwegian author Sigrid Undset, who had converted to Roman Catholicism at age 42 in 1924, visited the remains of Selja monastery in 1926 and was inspired to write a novella based on the legend, completed by 1928, for which she commissioned fifteen watercolour illustrations by her friend Gøsta af Geijerstam. The book was first published in German in 1932. An edition with Undset's original Norwegian text appeared only in 2000.

Saint Sunniva on the municipal coat of arms of Stad, Norway

Numerous institutions in Norway are named for Sunniva, including the Catholic church in Molde, various schools—including St Sunniva School in Oslo—several Norwegian ships, the St. Sunniva dormitory in Bergen, and the Sunniva Centre for Palliative Care (Sunniva senter for lindrende behandling) in Bergen. Selje Municipality introduced a municipal coat of arms depicting Sunniva in 1991. In 2020, Stad Municipality created a coat of arms depicting St. Sunniva as well.

For an exhibition dedicated to Sunniva in Bergen Museum, under the title of "St. Sunniva and the holy shrine" (Sankta Sunniva og det heilage skrinet), on 7 September 2011, a reconstruction of the shrine was made and transferred to the museum in a procession involving a reconstructed longboat, commemorating the historical translation of the saint's relics.

== See also ==
- Sunniva (given name)

== Other sources ==
- Yngvar Nielsen, De Gamle helligdomme paa Selja, in: Historiske Afhandlinger tilegnet RJE Prof. Sars. 1905, pp 164–181.
- (in German) Sigrid Undset, Martha Näf (trans.), Gösta af Geijerstam (illustrations), Sunniva, J. Müller (1932); (in Norwegian) Den hellige Sunniva Selje: Scriptoriet (2000).
- Cato Passenger, Helligdommen på Selja, in: Norske fortidsminnesmerkers forening. Årbok 1949.
- Ekkart Sauser, "Sunniva", Biographic-bibliographic church encyclopedia (BBKL). Volume 18, Bautz, Herzberg 2001, ISBN 3-88309-086-7, Sp. 1356–1357.
- Hoops, Johannes, Reallexikon der germanischen Altertumskunde: Band 22. Walter de Gruyter (2003), ISBN 3-11-017351-4
- Oddr Snorrason, Theodore M. Andersson (trans.) The Saga of Olaf Tryggvason. Cornell University Press (2003), ISBN 0-8014-4149-8
- Jan Erik Rekdal, "Sunnivalegenden - irsk rekved mellom norrøne fjæresteiner?" in: Jon Vidar Sigurdsson; Marit Myking & Magnus Rindal (eds.), Religionsskiftet i Norden. Brytinger mellom nordisk og europeisk kultur 800-1200. Unipub forlag (2004), 159–196.
- Lisbeth Mikaelsson, "Locality and Myth: The Resacralization of Selja and the Cult of St. Sunniva". In: NUMEN, Vol. 52 (2005).
- Torunn Selberg, "The actualization of the sacred place of Selja and the legend of Saint Sunniva", Arv. Nordic yearbook of Folklore (2005).
- O'Hara, Alexander (2009). "Constructing a saint: The legend of St Sunniva in twelfth-century Norway". Viking and Medieval Scandinavia. 5: 105–121. doi:10.1484/J.VMS.1.100675.
- Espen Svendsen (ed.), "St. Sunniva and the Holy Shrine", English-language exhibition catalogue, Bryggens Museum (2011).
