= Rognaldsvåg =

Village in Kinn Municipality, Norway

- Village
- Interactive map of Rognaldsvåg
- Location within Vestland Location within Norway
- Coordinates: 61.56461°N 4.79344°E
- Country: Norway
- Region: Western Norway
- County: Vestland
- District: Sunnfjord
- Municipality: Kinn Municipality
- Elevation: 7 m (23 ft)
- Time zone: UTC+01:00 (CET)
  - Summer (DST): UTC+02:00 (CEST)
- Post Code: 6915 Rognaldsvåg

Rognaldsvåg is a fishing village in Kinn Municipality in Vestland county, Norway. It is located on the western end of the island of Reksta, less than 1 kilometre (0.62 mi) east of the island of Kinn and about 2 kilometres (1.2 mi) south of the island of Skorpa. The town of Florø is located about 10 kilometres (6.2 mi) to the east and the island of Askrova is 8 kilometres (5.0 mi) to the southeast. The small village has about 80 residents (as of 2012). The village has two ports with a distinctive channel between them where boathouses are close together. Rognaldsvåg is rich in ambience and cultural heritage with cemeteries and ruins from the Viking Age.

== Local dialect ==
Rognaldsvåg accent
Man from Rognaldsvåg, without place names

Rognaldsvåg accent
Man from Rognaldsvåg, with place names
