= Florø Church =

Church in Vestland, Norway

- Florø kyrkje
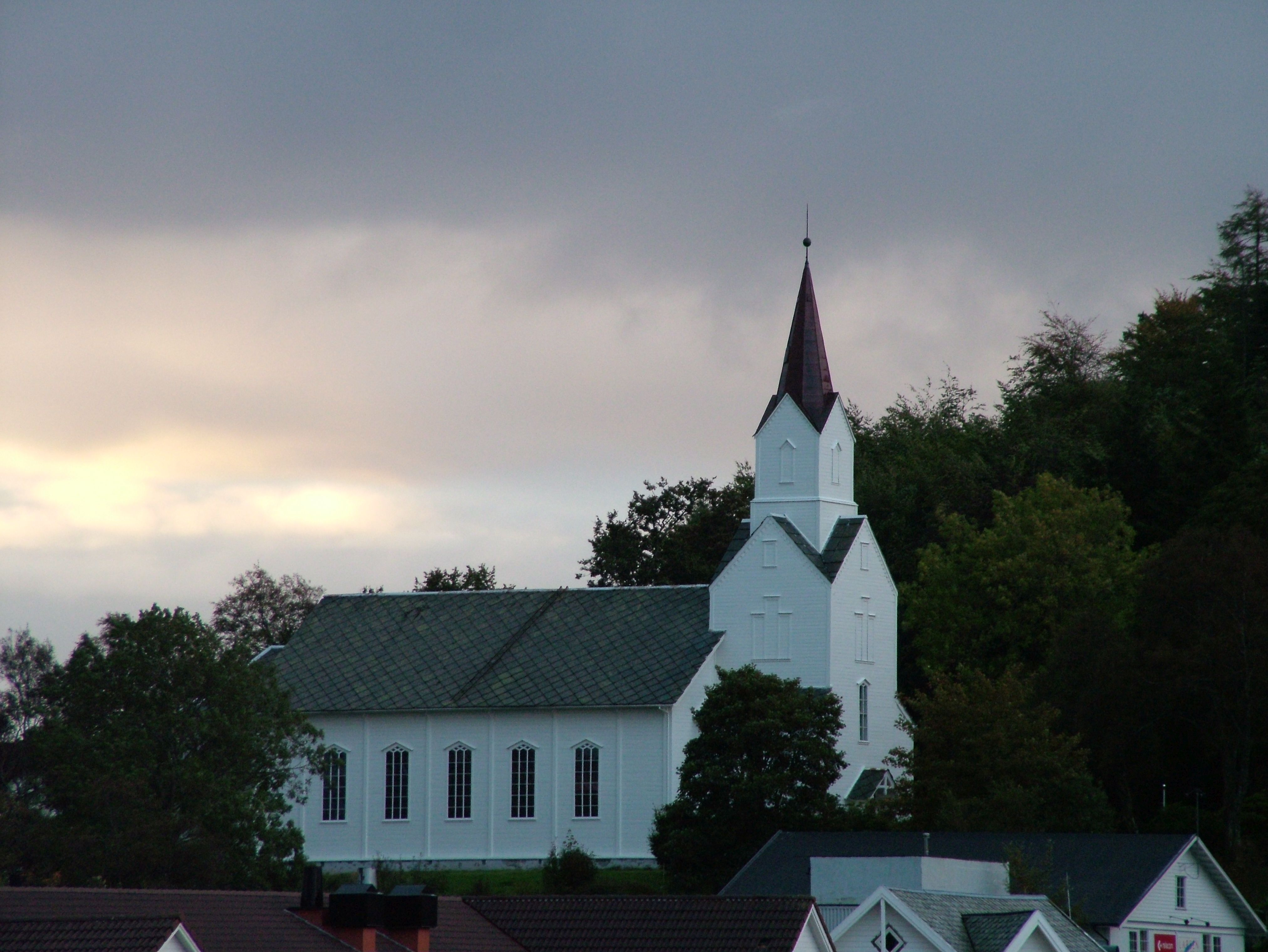
- View of the church
- Florø Church
- 61°35′56″N 5°01′45″E
- Location: Kinn Municipality, Vestland
- Country: Norway
- Denomination: Church of Norway
- Churchmanship: Evangelical Lutheran

History
- Status: Parish church
- Founded: 1882
- Consecrated: 8 Nov 1882

Architecture
- Functional status: Active
- Architect: Jacob Wilhelm Nordan
- Architectural type: Long church
- Completed: 1882 (144 years ago)

Specifications
- Capacity: 500
- Materials: Wood

Administration
- Diocese: Bjørgvin bispedømme
- Deanery: Sunnfjord prosti
- Parish: Kinn
- Norwegian Cultural Heritage Site
- Type: Church
- Status: Not protected
- ID: 84164

Florø Church (Norwegian: Florø kyrkje) is a parish church of the Church of Norway in Kinn Municipality in Vestland county, Norway. It is located in the town of Florø. It is the main church for the Kinn parish, which is part of the Sunnfjord prosti (deanery) in the Diocese of Bjørgvin. The white, wooden church was built in a long church design in 1882 using plans drawn up by the architect Jacob Wilhelm Nordan. The church seats about 500 people.

== History ==
For the first 22 years after Florø was designated as a ladested (town) in 1860, it had no church. It was probably the only town in the country without a church of its own. The townspeople had to undertake the long 16-kilometre (9.9 mi) long sea voyage to the old Kinn Church on the island of Kinn to be able to attend church services. The church issue was a recurrent topic in the Florø town council every year after 1860. In 1882, the church was finally completed in the town, and it became the main church for the parish, with the old Kinn Church being taken out of regular service. The church was consecrated on 8 November 1882 by the bishop Fredrik W. Hvoslef.

== Building ==
Florø Church is a big church built with a high nave. On either side wall there are five big windows with pointed gables. The chancel is rectangular with a pentagonal apse with three large windows. All the stained-glass windows are framed in lead. There are two vestries, one for the vicar and one reserved for babies to be christened. The church had an organ for the consecration ceremony in 1882, and this was one of the first organs in the region of Sunnfjord.

The colours in the church are in various shades of grey, repainted in 1999. At the same time the pews were repaired and fitted with cushions. Two rows of pews at the back of the nave have been removed to make space for various exhibits, and also to provide a meeting place for "church coffee" functions. There were no stoves when the church was new, but they were installed five years later in 1887. Only in 1965 did the church get electric heating.

== See also ==
- List of churches in Bjørgvin
