= Batalden Chapel =

Church in Vestland, Norway

- Batalden bedehuskapell
- Batalden Chapel
- 61°37′22″N 4°49′10″E
- Location: Kinn Municipality, Vestland
- Country: Norway
- Denomination: Church of Norway
- Churchmanship: Evangelical Lutheran

History
- Status: Chapel
- Founded: 1907
- Consecrated: 26 Feb 1911

Architecture
- Functional status: Active
- Architectural type: Long church
- Completed: 1907 (119 years ago)

Specifications
- Capacity: 100
- Materials: Wood

Administration
- Diocese: Bjørgvin bispedømme
- Deanery: Sunnfjord prosti
- Parish: Kinn

Batalden Chapel (Norwegian: Batalden bedehuskapell) is a chapel of the Church of Norway in Kinn Municipality in Vestland county, Norway. It is located on the small island of Fanøya in the Batalden islands. It is an annex chapel in the Kinn parish which is part of the Sunnfjord prosti (deanery) in the Diocese of Bjørgvin. The white, wooden church was built in a long church design in 1907 using plans drawn up by an unknown architect. The church seats about 100 people.

== History ==
The building was constructed in 1907 as a prayer house and community centre (bedehus) on the island of Fanøya. The rich herring fisheries in the area meant that a large number of fishermen from all parts of the coast congregated for long periods of time during the winter months. The name of the prayer house was Batalden which comes from the name of the big island a little to the north of Fanøya which gives name to the archipelago. The new prayer house was consecrated on 23 October 1907. Soon after, the residents wanted to use it as a more formal annex chapel within the parish, so on 26 February 1911 it was consecrated for church use. The chapel was renovated in 1930. A new pulpit and baptismal font were installed in the building at that time. In 1951, a bell tower was constructed. In 1954, the church received electricity.

== See also ==
- List of churches in Bjørgvin
