= Ytterøyane Lighthouse =

Coastal lighthouse in Norway

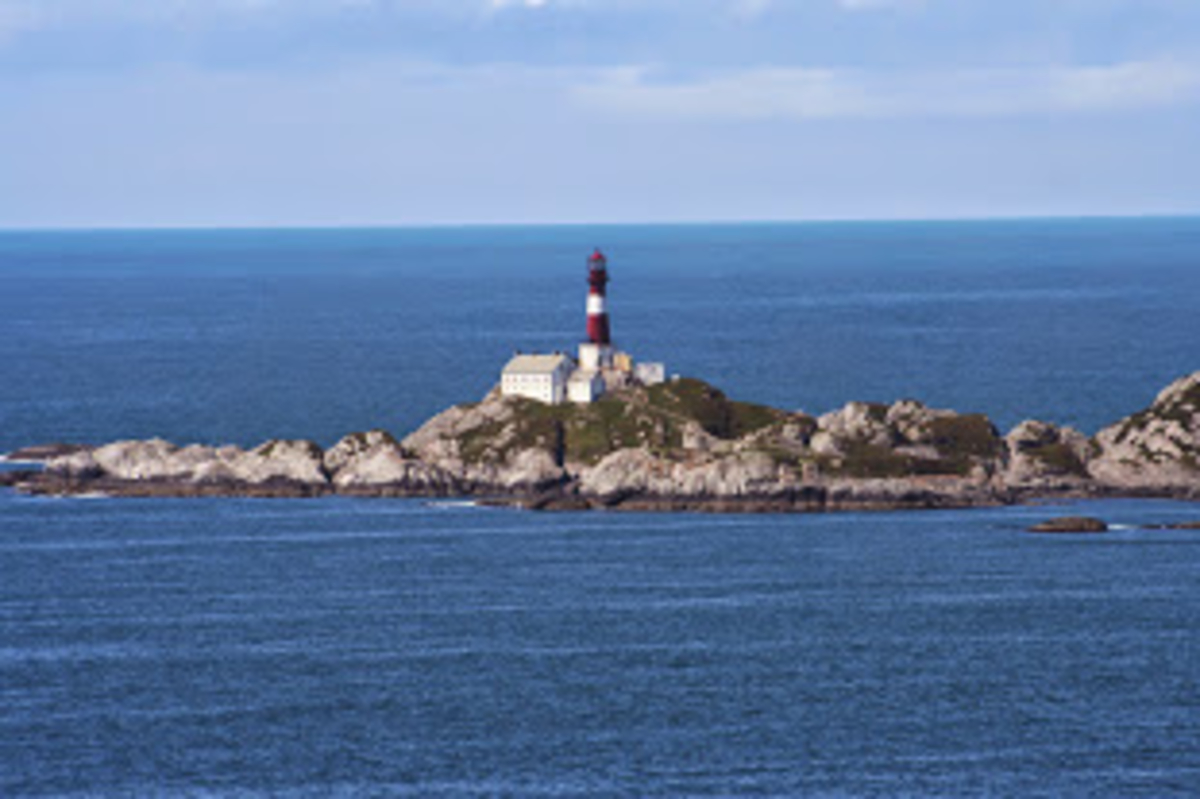
- Location: Kinn Municipality, Vestland county, Norway
- Coordinates: 61°34′N 4°41′E

Tower
- Constructed: 1881
- Construction: cast iron tower
- Automated: 2004
- Height: 31 m (102 ft)
- Shape: tapered cylindrical tower with balcony and lantern
- Markings: red tower with a white band
- Heritage: cultural property

Light
- Focal height: 59 m (194 ft)
- Lens: 1st order Fresnel lens
- Intensity: 2,799,000 candela
- Range: 11 nmi (20 km; 13 mi)
- Characteristic: Fl(3) W 30s

Ytterøyane Lighthouse (Norwegian: Ytterøyane fyr) is a coastal lighthouse in Kinn Municipality in Vestland county, Norway.

== History ==
It was first lit in 1881 and it was automated in 2004.

The cast iron tower is painted red with one white horizontal band; the base is painted white. The 31-metre (102 ft) tall tower sits on a 2-story octagonal masonry base. The original 1st order Fresnel lens is still in use at the top of the tower. The light emits three white flashes every 60 seconds at an elevation of 56 metres (184 ft) above sea level.

It is located on an isolated island in the Norwegian Sea about 20 kilometres (12 mi) west of the town of Florø and about 3 kilometres (1.9 mi) northwest of the small island of Kinn. The lighthouse is accessible only by boat.

== Climate ==
Climate data for Ytterøyane Lighthouse 1991-2020 (26 m, extremes 1984-2024)
Month	Jan	Feb	Mar	Apr	May	Jun	Jul	Aug	Sep	Oct	Nov	Dec	Year
Record high °C (°F)	10.6 (51.1)	10.6 (51.1)	11.5 (52.7)	19.5 (67.1)	24.6 (76.3)	28 (82)	30 (86)	26.9 (80.4)	22 (72)	20.7 (69.3)	19.4 (66.9)	13 (55)	30 (86)
Mean daily maximum °C (°F)	5.4 (41.7)	4.7 (40.5)	5.4 (41.7)	7.7 (45.9)	10.3 (50.5)	12.7 (54.9)	15.4 (59.7)	16.4 (61.5)	14.2 (57.6)	11 (52)	8.2 (46.8)	6.2 (43.2)	9.8 (49.7)
Daily mean °C (°F)	4.2 (39.6)	3.4 (38.1)	3.9 (39.0)	5.9 (42.6)	8.4 (47.1)	11.1 (52.0)	13.6 (56.5)	14.6 (58.3)	12.9 (55.2)	9.6 (49.3)	6.9 (44.4)	4.9 (40.8)	8.3 (46.9)
Mean daily minimum °C (°F)	2.5 (36.5)	1.8 (35.2)	2.4 (36.3)	4.3 (39.7)	6.9 (44.4)	9.6 (49.3)	12.2 (54.0)	13.2 (55.8)	11.3 (52.3)	8 (46)	5.2 (41.4)	3.2 (37.8)	6.7 (44.1)
Record low °C (°F)	−8 (18)	−8.7 (16.3)	−6 (21)	−4.1 (24.6)	0 (32)	4.5 (40.1)	7 (45)	7.5 (45.5)	4 (39)	0 (32)	−5.2 (22.6)	−3.8 (25.2)	−8.7 (16.3)
Average precipitation mm (inches)	129.1 (5.08)	122.7 (4.83)	103.2 (4.06)	66.3 (2.61)	61.3 (2.41)	64.7 (2.55)	83.9 (3.30)	102.2 (4.02)	124.8 (4.91)	117.4 (4.62)	143.6 (5.65)	134.2 (5.28)	1,253.4 (49.32)
Source 1: Norwegian Meteorological Institute/eklima
Source 2: NOAA-WMO averages 91-2020 Norway

== See also ==
- Lighthouses in Norway
- List of lighthouses in Norway
