= Selja Abbey =

Ruined Benedictine monastery

Coordinates: 62°03′04″N 5°17′49″E

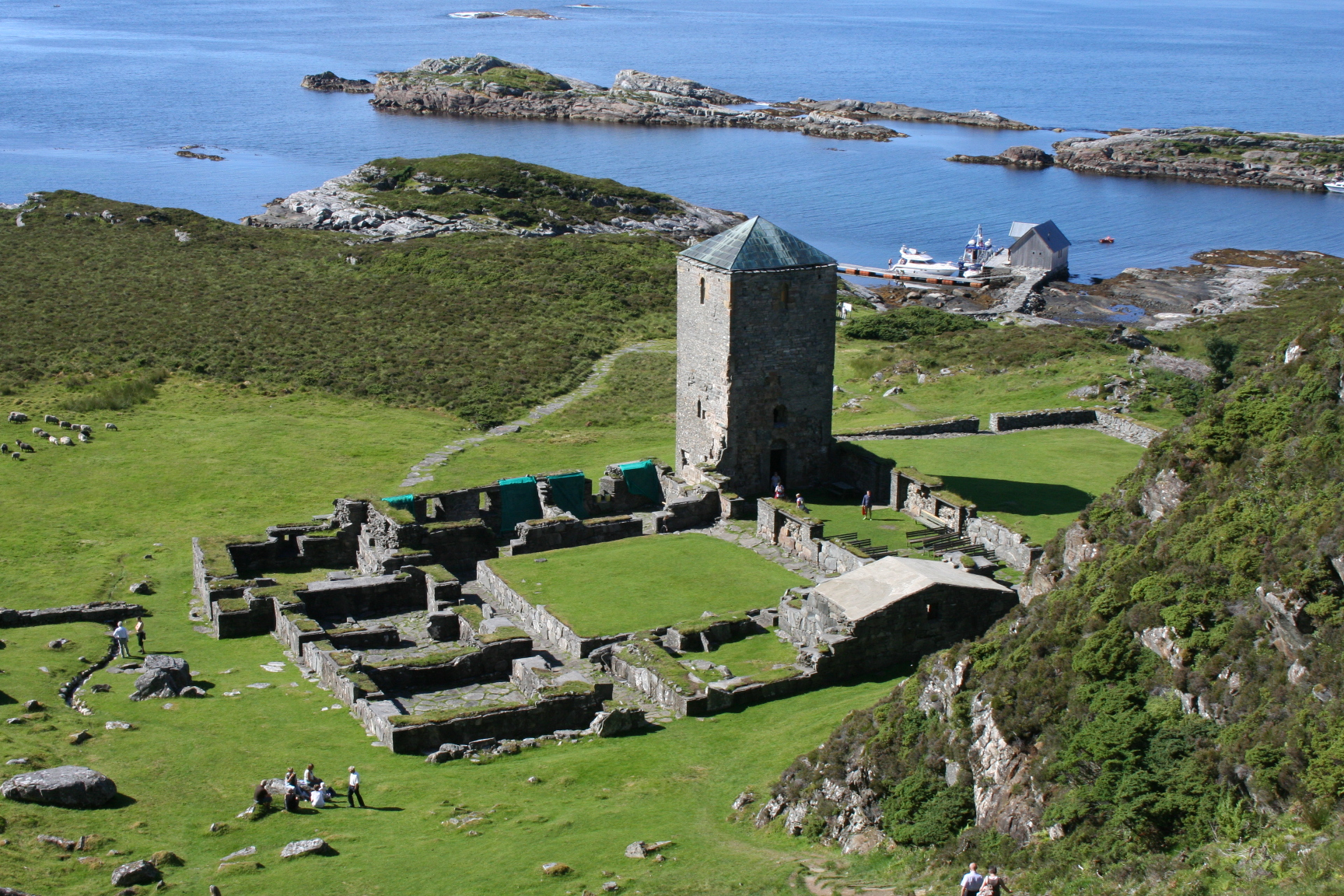
Ruins of Selje Abbey

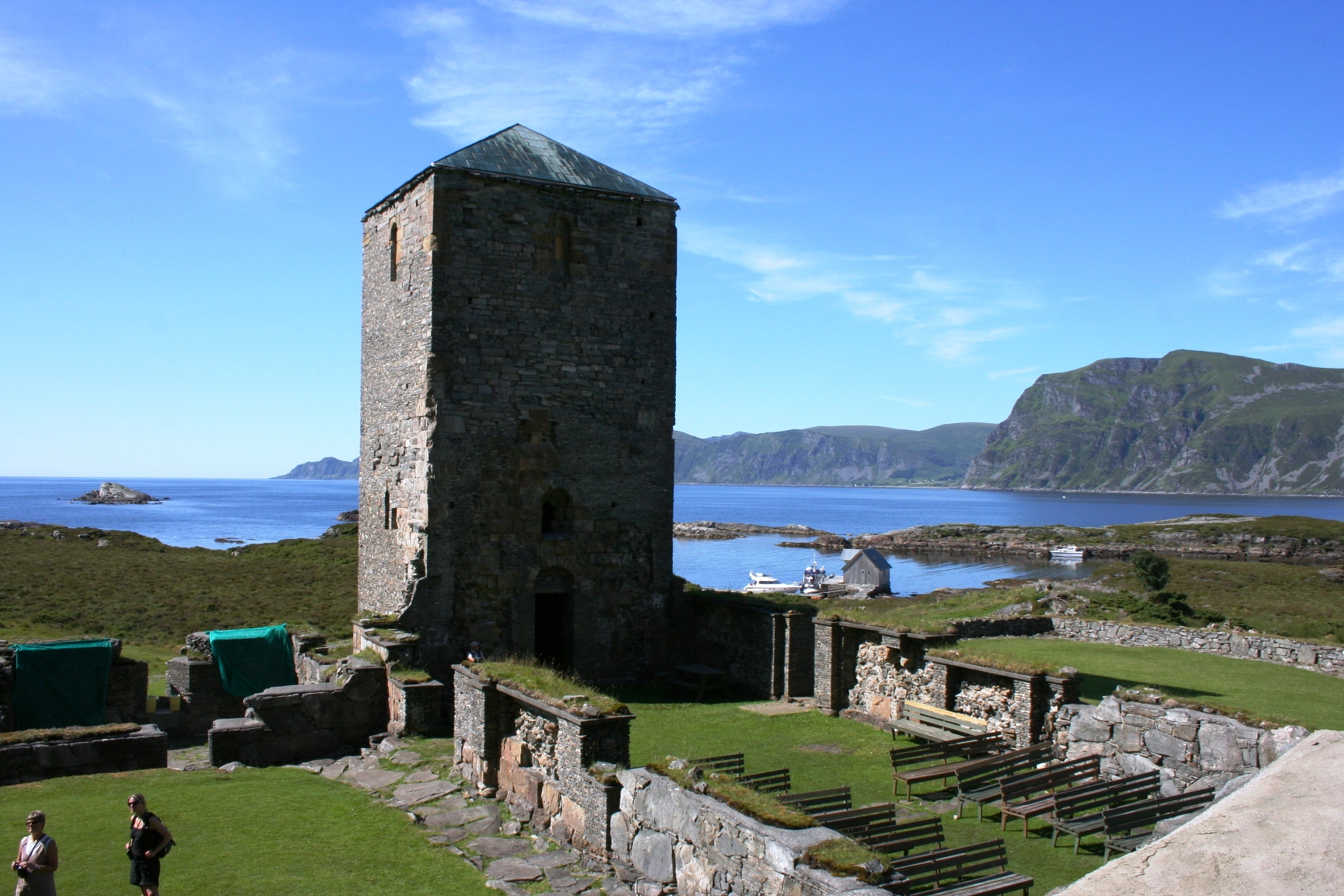
Tower of Selje Abbey

Selja Abbey (Norwegian: Selja kloster) was a Benedictine monastery located on the island of Selja in Stad Municipality in Vestland county, Norway. The island of Selja, which has been formerly known as Sellø or Selø, is located 15 minutes by boat from the mainland village of Selje.

== History ==
The monastery was founded around the year 1100. The construction of the benedictine monastery is seen in the context of the legend of Saint Sunniva, the patron saint of the Norwegian Ancient Diocese of Bergen. Known as Sunniva of Selja (Sunniva av Selja), according to legend Sunniva was the heir of an Irish kingdom who had to flee from a heathen king. She fled to island of Selja where she died. At the time of the abbey's foundation, the island of Selje was an important Christian site. It was the location of the original shrine of Saint Sunniva and for that reason was a place of pilgrimage, and also the seat of a bishopric and a cathedral dedicated to Saint Michael, established about 1070.

The bishop was instrumental in the establishment of the monastery here, and throughout its history there remained a strong connection between the abbey and the bishopric. However, the bishop moved to Bergen shortly after the monastery was founded, although the shrine of Saint Sunniva did not leave the island for Bergen until about 1170. After that time the monastery remained here alone.

For the first two centuries of its existence it was a thriving and important centre. Selja situated halfway between Bergen and Nidaros, was a natural stopover for travelers. But a disastrous fire in 1305 gave the abbey a blow from which it never recovered. It is not clear to what extent the monastery was rebuilt. The small remaining community may have been wiped out by the Black Death in 1349, although there is a possibility that some sort of monastic community still existed on the island as late as 1451. If there was, it came to an end under Bishop Finnboge of Bergen (1461-1474), who dismissed the last abbot and took over the abbey estates for the use of the See of Bergen; an appeal to the Pope to divert them instead to the use of Nidarholm Abbey came to nothing.

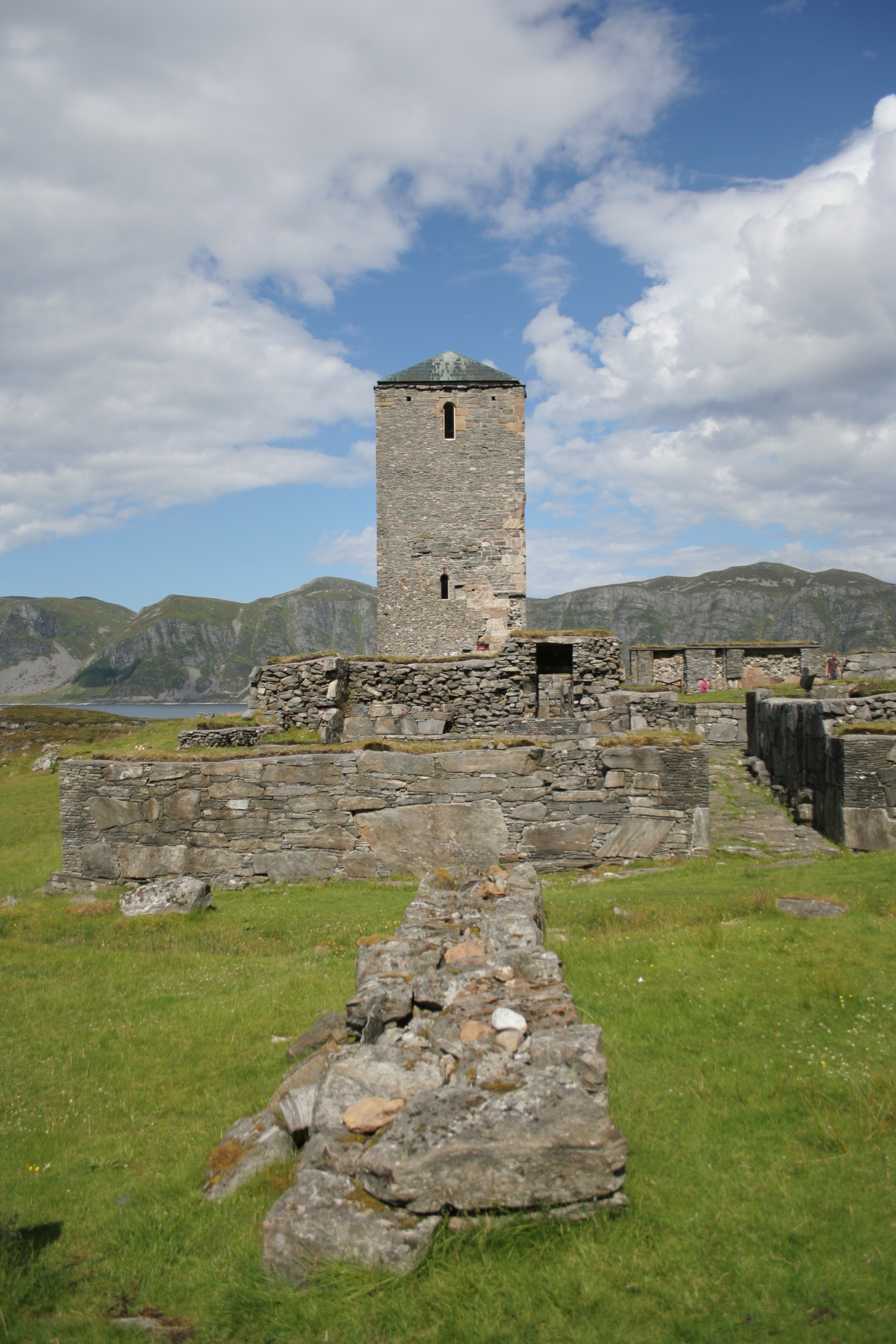
Bell Tower of Selje Abbey

== Site ==
Due to a lack of later habitation, the ruins the abbey as well as the shrine of Saint Sunniva and the cathedral are extensive and extremely well preserved. The artist Bernt Tunold (1877– 1946) spent his childhood and some of his adult life on the island and often painted the monastery ruins.

== Gallery ==
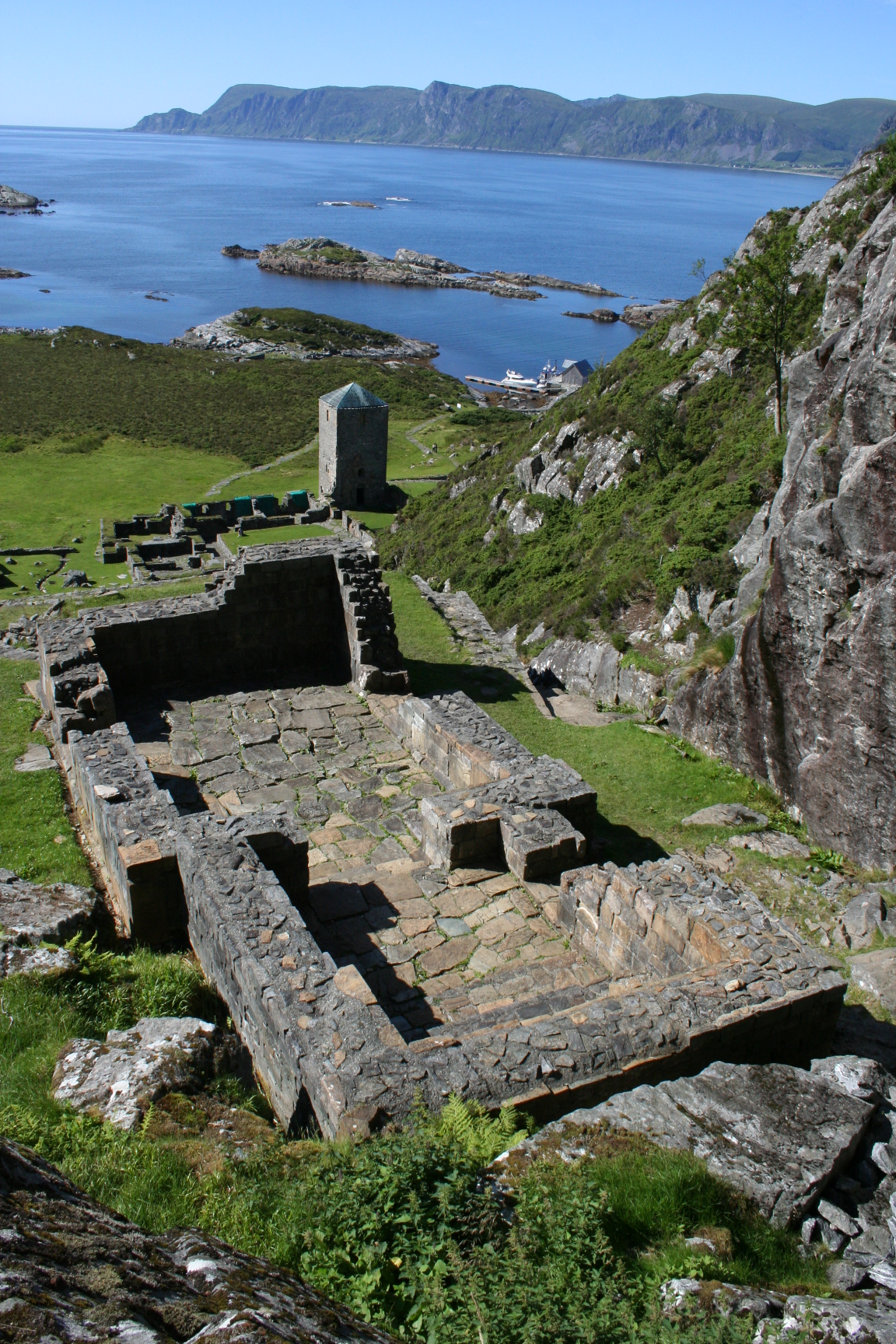

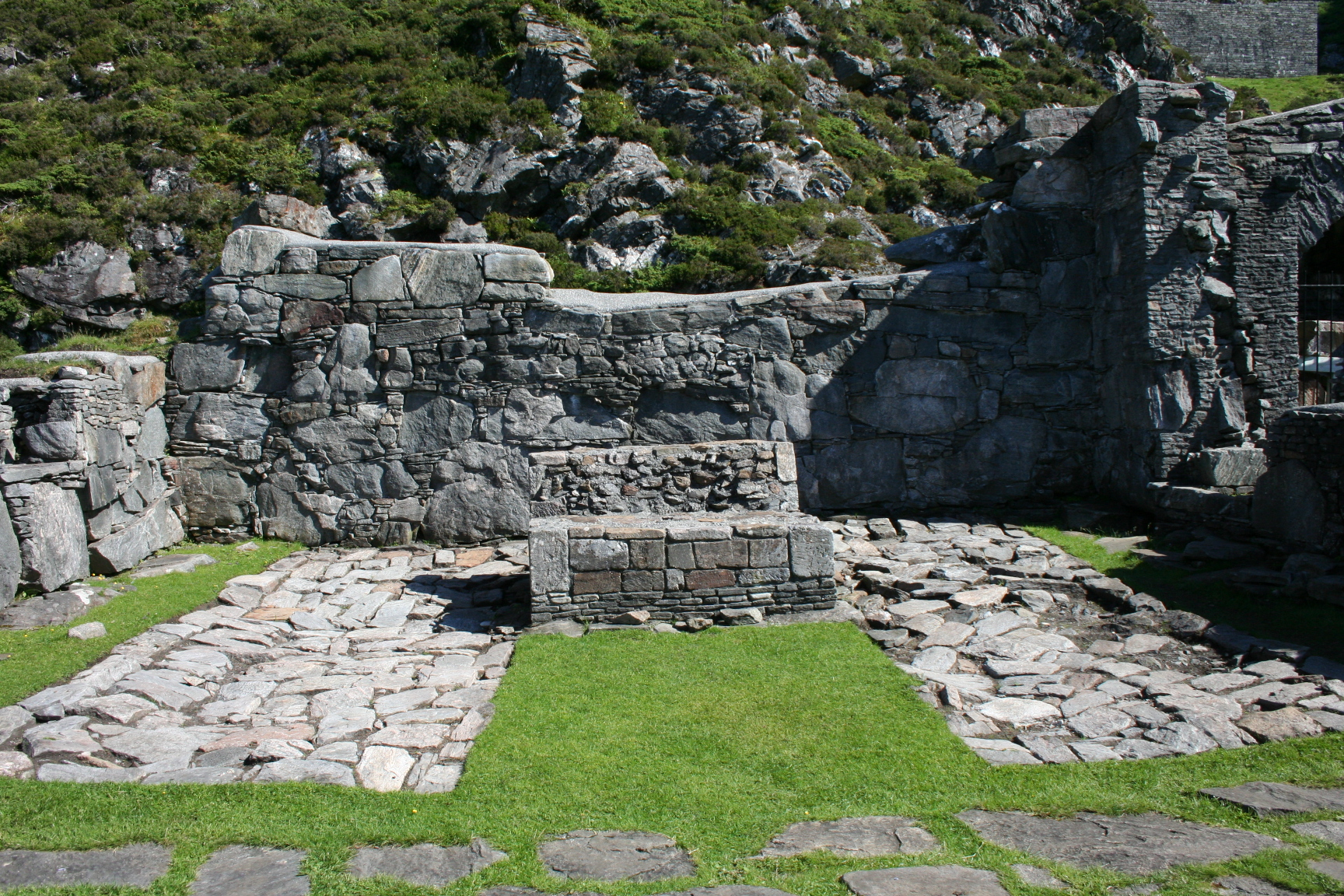

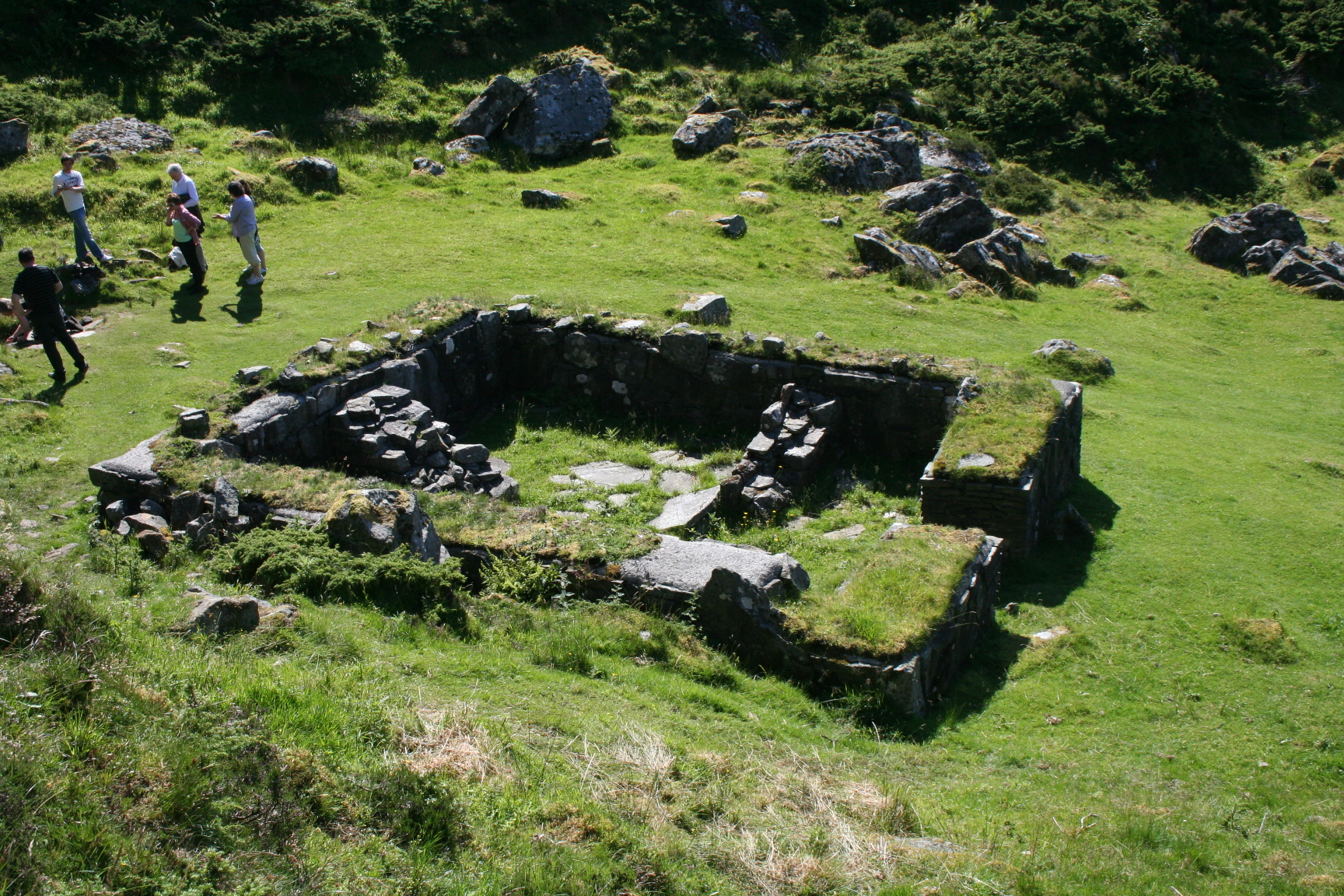

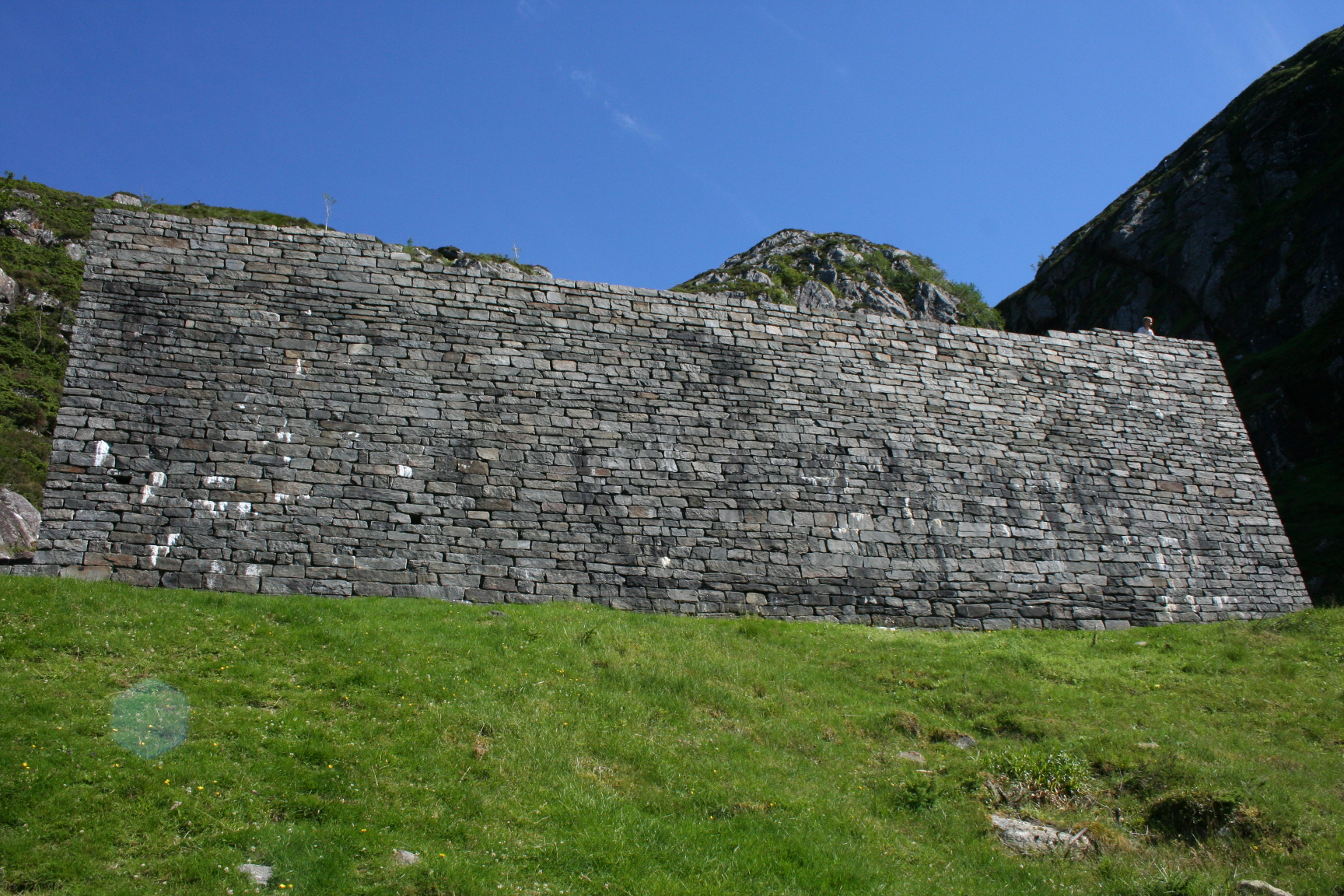

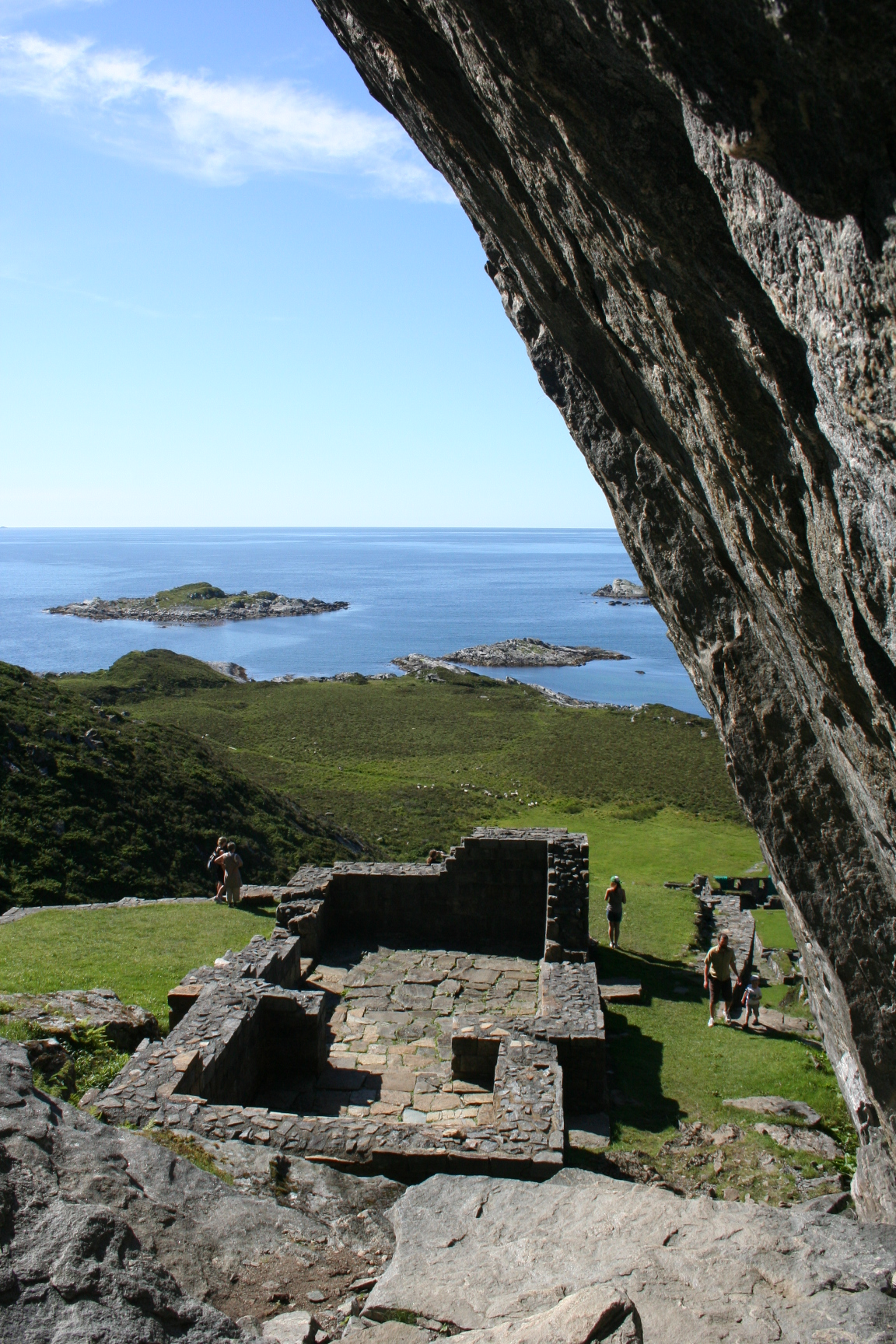

== Other Sources ==
- Norges klostre i middelalderen: Selje kloster (Den katolske kirke)

== Related reading ==
- Djupedal, Torkjell 91996) Selja Kulturhistorisk handbok (Selja forlag) ISBN 82-91722-00-5
- Henriksen, Vera (1992) Selja og Stad – legender, saga og historie (Sogn og Fjordane forlag) ISBN 82-90576-19-6
- Luthen, Eivind (1997) Selja Sunnivakulten og pilegrimsmålet (Pilegrimsforlaget/Scriptoriet) ISBN 82-91677-02-6
- Nybø, Marit (2010) Albanuskirken på Selja i et forskninghistorisk perspektiv i Sigrid Lien & Caroline Serck-Hanssen (Talende bilder. Bergen) ISBN 978-82-304-0056-2
- Undset, Sigrid (2000) Den hellige Sunniva. Illustrasjoner av Gøsta af Geijerstam (Scriptoriet Selje) ISBN 82-91859-01-9
