= Sunniva (crustacean) =

Scientific classification
- Domain: Eukaryota
- Kingdom: Animalia
- Phylum: Arthropoda
- Class: Malacostraca
- Order: Isopoda
- Suborder: Oniscidea
- Genus: Sunniva; Budde-Lund, 1908

Type species
- Sunniva mystica Budde-Lund, 1908

Genus of woodlice

Sunniva is a genus of woodlouse within the Oniscidea of uncertain placement. Members of the genus are distributed in Madagascar and the Mascarene Islands.

== Species ==
- Sunniva carinotelson Barnard, 1964
- Sunniva mammillata Barnard, 1936
- Sunniva minor Budde-Lund, 1908
- Sunniva mystica Budde-Lund, 1908
- Sunniva uniformis Barnard, 1936
