= Reksta =

Island in Vestland, Norway

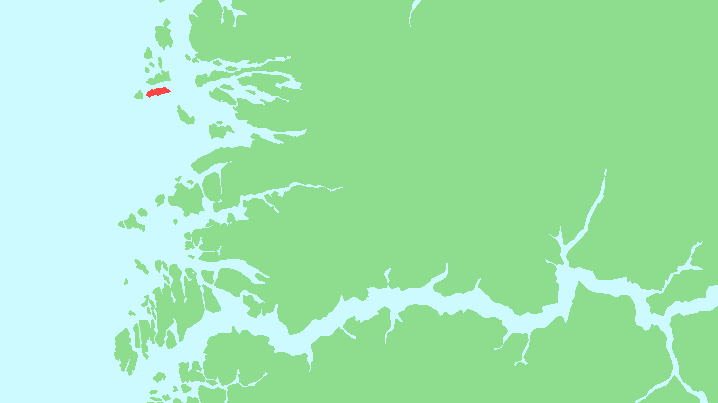
- Reksta, Norway
- Interactive map of Reksta

Geography
- Location: Vestland, Norway
- Coordinates: 61.5677°N 4.8346°E
- Area: 5.6 km^{2} (2.2 sq mi)
- Length: 5.8 km (3.6 mi)
- Width: 1.5 km (0.93 mi)
- Coastline: 24 km (14.9 mi)
- Highest elevation: 220 m (720 ft)
- Highest point: Harefjellet

Administration
- Norway
- County: Vestland
- Municipality: Kinn Municipality

Demographics
- Population: 144 (2001)

Reksta is an island in Kinn Municipality in Vestland county, Norway. The 5.8-square-kilometre (2.2 sq mi) island lies about 7 kilometres (4.3 mi) west of the town of Florø in a large group of inhabited islands. Reksta sits about 600 metres (2,000 ft) east of the island of Kinn, about 5 kilometres (3.1 mi) north of the island of Askrova, and about 1.4 kilometres (0.87 mi) south of the island of Skorpa. Most of the inhabitants on Reksta live on the west side in and around the small fishing village of Rognaldsvåg. The population of the island (2001) is 144.
