= Fanøya =

Island in Vestland, Norway

Fanøya Fanøy
- Interactive map of Fanøya; Fanøy

Geography
- Location: Vestland, Norway
- Coordinates: 61.6244°N 4.8067°E
- Area: 1 km^{2} (0.39 sq mi)
- Length: 1.6 km (0.99 mi)
- Width: 1.2 km (0.75 mi)
- Coastline: 8 km (5 mi)
- Highest elevation: 51.5 m (169 ft)
- Highest point: Storehaugen

Administration
- Norway
- County: Vestland
- Municipality: Kinn Municipality

Fanøya is an island in Kinn Municipality in Vestland county, Norway. The island lies about 10 kilometres (6.2 mi) northwest of the town of Florø in a large group of inhabited islands. Fanøya, the most populous island in the group, is 1.6 kilometres (0.99 mi) north of the island of Skorpa, about 600 metres (2,000 ft) south of the island of Batalden, and about 4 kilometres (2.5 mi) southwest of the island of Hovden. The Batalden Chapel is located on Fanøya.

== See also ==
- List of islands of Norway
