= Gøsta af Geijerstam =

Gøsta af Geijerstam (22 August 1888 – 20 August 1954, also Gösta, Gustaf) was a Swedish-Norwegian author and painter.

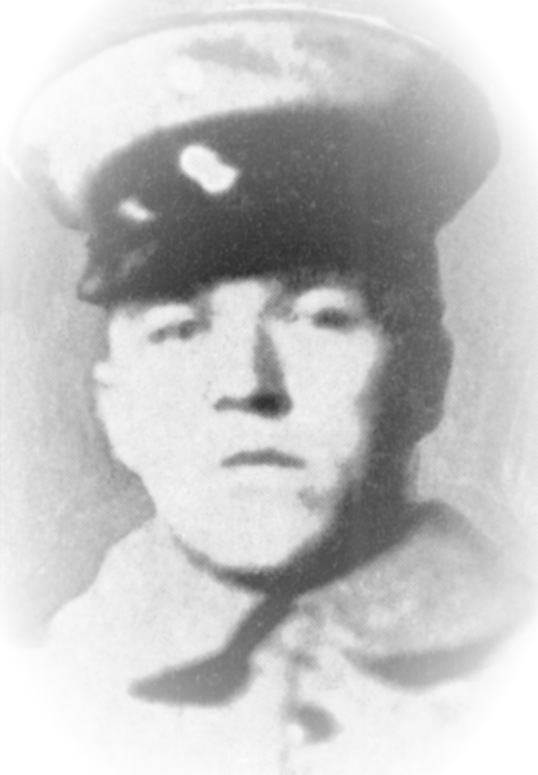
Gøsta af Geijerstam

His family moved from Stockholm to Dale, Sogn og Fjordane in 1905, where he spent most of his life. He studied in Munich, Paris and Berlin, and settled in Norway permanently in 1913, in which year he also married singer Astri Smith.

He debuted in with sketches of hunting scenes, in Krigare och Björnjägare ("warriors and bear-hunters", 1916), followed by Finska bataljonen ("Finnish battalion", 1922) and Ormgutten, Roald og jeg (1922). His novels Inger (1924), Iva Storgaarden (1926) and Hulder-Berret (1928) depicted the life of farmers in Gudbrandsdalen. He published an autobiography, Ongene og vi to i Storevik, in 1937.

His paintings and drawings are distinctly romantic, with a mood of mystery and magic. He illustrated several books, and he was commissioned for the decoration of the Catholic churches of Haugesund, Tromsø and Trondheim.

His friendship with author Sigrid Undset was documented by his daughter, Sunniva af Geijerstam Hagenlund (b. 1929) in a 1994 publication.
