= Lectorium =

Non-profit organisation in Rostov-on-Don, Russia

Coordinates: 47.141648°N 39.415910°E

- Logo of the Lectorium
- Founded: Rostov-on-Don, Russia; 26 September 2009
- Purpose: Free, open content, education projects
- Location(s): Rostov-on-Don; Russia
- Region served: Worldwide
- Method: local events and worldwide on-line open education center
- Key people: Daniil Alexeev, Gertsen Andrey
- Volunteers: 8
- Website: lectorium.org

The Lectorium (Latin: Lectorium, Russian: Лекториум) is a non-profit organization headquartered in Rostov-on-Don, Russia. It produces educational and edutainment open events and projecting a worldwide on-line educational center.

== Mission ==
Make all worldwide on-line educational products free and open.

== History ==
The Lectorium education project was founded on 26 September 2009. Now (on 11 May 2011) it produced more than 80 events.

== Activities ==
Every week project is producing edutainment and educational events with participation of local celebrities and young sciences. The Lectorium produce different format open events: discussions, lectures, seminars, etc. Russian Wiki-conference 2010 in Rostov-on-Don was organized by cooperation of Wikimedia RU and Lectorium.
