= Batalden (Vestland) =

Island in Vestland, Norway

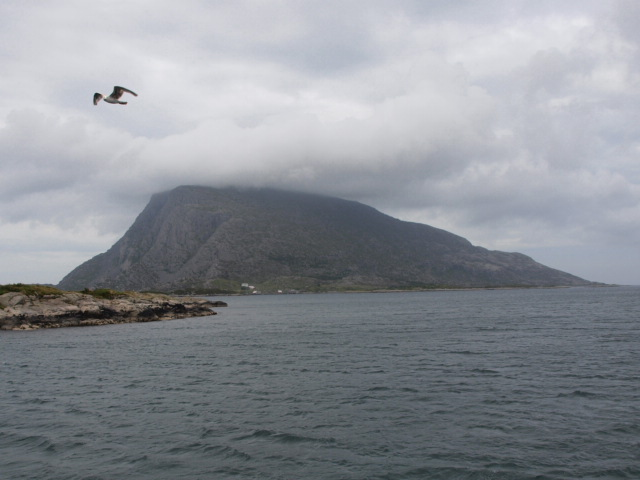
- View of the island
- Interactive map of Batalden

Geography
- Location: Vestland, Norway
- Coordinates: 61.64384°N 4.79293°E
- Area: 3.3 km^{2} (1.3 sq mi)
- Length: 2.8 km (1.74 mi)
- Width: 1.9 km (1.18 mi)
- Highest elevation: 491 m (1611 ft)
- Highest point: Batalden

Administration
- Norway
- County: Vestland
- Municipality: Kinn Municipality

Batalden is an island in Kinn Municipality in Vestland county, Norway. The island lies in a large group of islands about 12 kilometres (7.5 mi) northwest of the town of Florø. The island of Hovden lies about 3 kilometres (1.9 mi) to the northwest, across the Hellefjorden. The island of Fanøya lies about 600 metres (2,000 ft) to the south of the island and the island of Skorpa lies about 3.2 kilometres (2.0 mi) to the southeast.

The village on the island is named Batalden, as is the main mountain that dominates the island. The island is also the namesake for the group of islands in which it is located. The island is sometimes referred to as Store Batalden (lit. 'Large Batalden') to distinguish it from the nearby island of Litle Batalden (lit. 'Little Batalden'), about 2 kilometres (1.2 mi) to the southwest.

== See also ==
- List of islands of Norway
