= St Sunniva School =

Location
- Oslo; Norway
- Coordinates: 59°55′08″N 10°44′43″E

Information
- Campus: Urban
- Website: http://www.stsunniva.no/

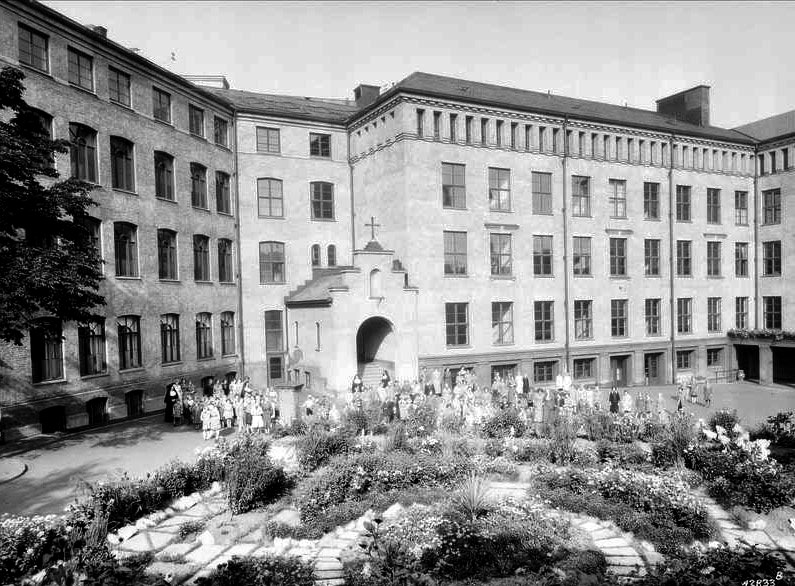
St. Sunniva School

St. Sunniva School (St. Sunniva skole) is an independent Roman Catholic school located in the centre of Oslo, Norway.

The school was founded by the Sisters of St. Joseph from Chambéry in the Rhône-Alpes region in south-eastern France. Founded in 1865, it was part of an effort to restore Roman Catholicism in Norway. Queen Josephine, consort of Sweden and Norway, was an ardent supporter of the school. Her sister Amélie, Empress of Brazil, also provided support.

The school was owned and operated by the Sisters of St. Joseph for 140 years. Since 1 August 2005, it has been owned and operated by the Catholic Diocese of Oslo (Oslo Katolske Bispedømme). The school averages 540 students between the first and tenth grade.
