= Kinn (island) =

Island in Vestland, Norway

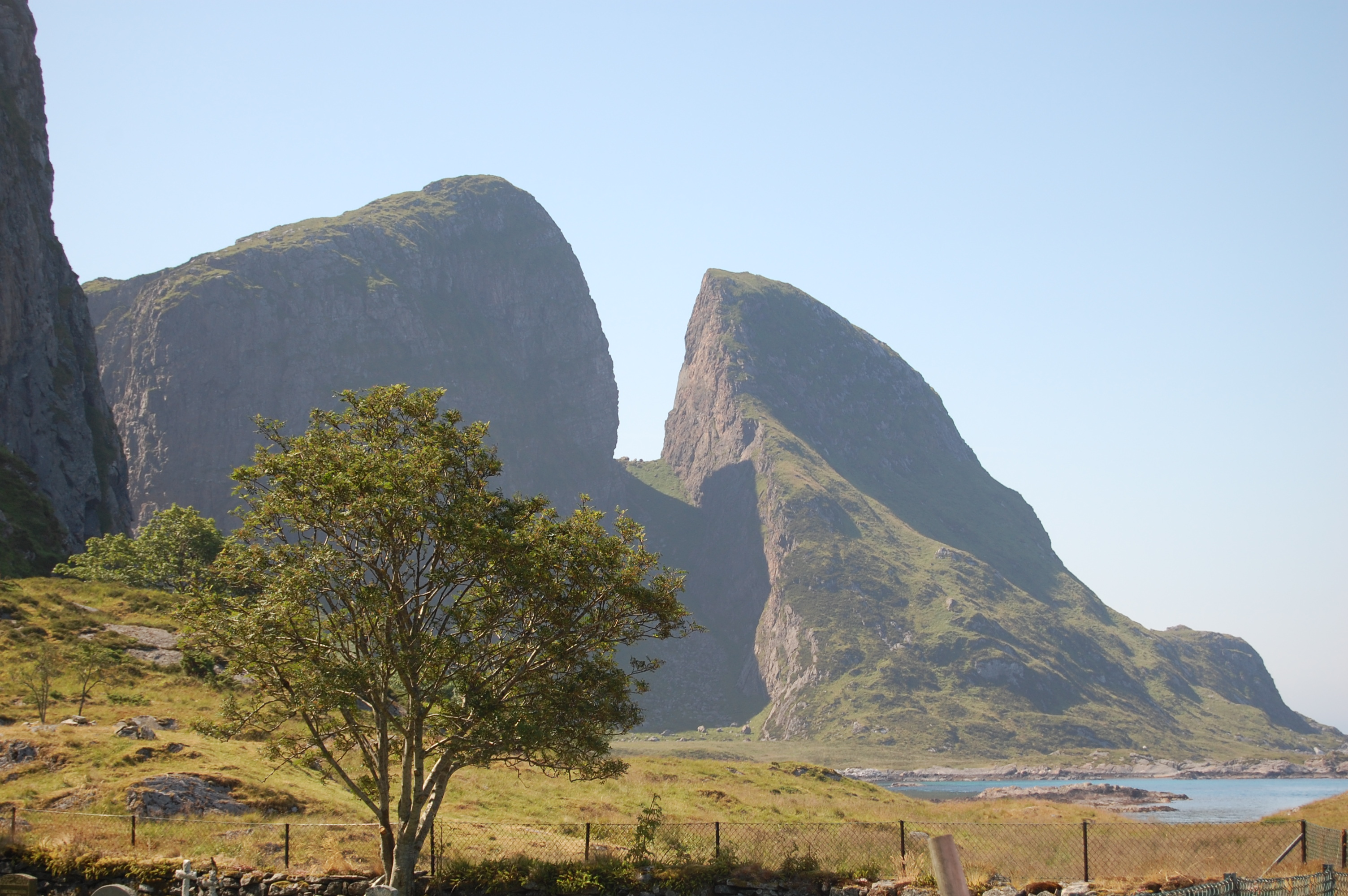
- Unique rock formation on the western side of the island
- Interactive map of Kinn

Geography
- Location: Vestland, Norway
- Coordinates: 61.5602°N 4.7527°E
- Area: 2.5 km^{2} (0.97 sq mi)
- Length: 2.8 km (1.74 mi)
- Width: 1.8 km (1.12 mi)
- Highest elevation: 315 m (1033 ft)
- Highest point: Kinnavarden

Administration
- Norway
- County: Vestland
- Municipality: Kinn Municipality

Kinn is an island in Kinn Municipality in Vestland county, Norway. The island lies about 12 kilometres (7.5 mi) west of the town of Florø. The neighboring island of Reksta (where the village of Rognaldsvåg is located) lies just 350 metres (1,150 ft) to the east of Kinn, the island of Skorpa lies about 2.5 kilometres (1.6 mi) northeast of Kinn, and the island of Askrova lies about 9 kilometres (5.6 mi) to the southeast. The Ytterøyane Lighthouse is located about 3 kilometres (1.9 mi) northwest of the island. The island can be reached by ferry from the town of Florø.

== Geography ==
The 2.5-square-kilometre (0.97 sq mi) island is dominated by a large mountain, with all its residents living on the east side. The mountain, Kinnaklova, is a very notable landmark to sailors in the region since it has a deep ravine that cuts through the center of the peak.

== History ==
The island is the home to the historic Kinn Church, dating back to the 12th century. For centuries, the church was the seat of the large parish of Kinn and used as an election church (Norwegian: valgkirke). The island was also the centre (and namesake) of the old Kinn Municipality which existed from 1838 until 1964. The Kinnaspelet, a historical play, is performed on the island every summer.

== Etymology ==
The island was named after the old Kinn farm (Old Norse: Kinn) since Kinn Church is located there. The name is identical with the word for "cheek", referring to the steep slope of a mountain on the island. Historically, the name was spelled Kind.

== See also ==
- List of islands of Norway
