= Skorpa, Kinn =

Island in Kinn, Norway

Skorpa
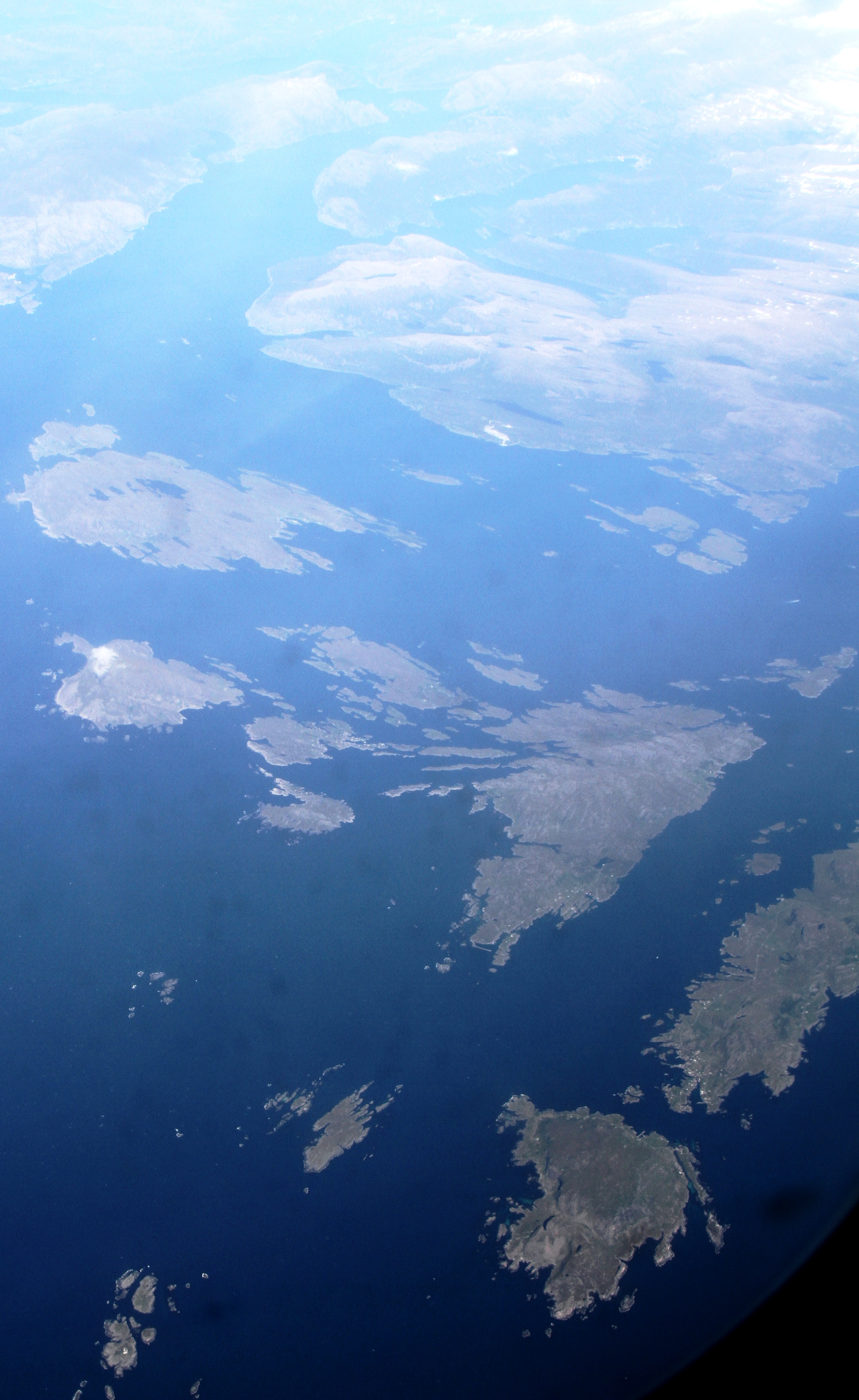
- Aerial view of Skorpa (center right part of the picture)
- Interactive map of Skorpa

Geography
- Location: Vestland, Norway
- Coordinates: 61.6001°N 4.8416°E
- Area: 9 km^{2} (3.5 sq mi)
- Length: 5.7 km (3.54 mi)
- Width: 2.8 km (1.74 mi)
- Highest elevation: 393 m (1289 ft)
- Highest point: Blåkollen

Administration
- Norway
- County: Vestland
- Municipality: Kinn Municipality

Demographics
- Population: 37 (2015)

Skorpa is an island in Kinn Municipality in Vestland county, Norway. The 9-square-kilometre (3.5 sq mi) island lies about 6 kilometres (3.7 mi) west of the town of Florø in a large group of inhabited islands. Skorpa lies about 1.5 kilometres (0.93 mi) north of the islands of Reksta and Kinn and about 1.5 kilometres (0.93 mi) south of the island of Fanøya.

The island is rocky, mountainous, and barren. The highest point is the 393-metre (1,289 ft) tall mountain Blåkollen. Almost all the settlement is located on the southwestern shore. The population (2015) was about 37 residents.

== See also ==
- List of islands of Norway
