= Land Municipality =

Former municipality in Oppland, Norway

Land Municipality Land herred
- Former municipality
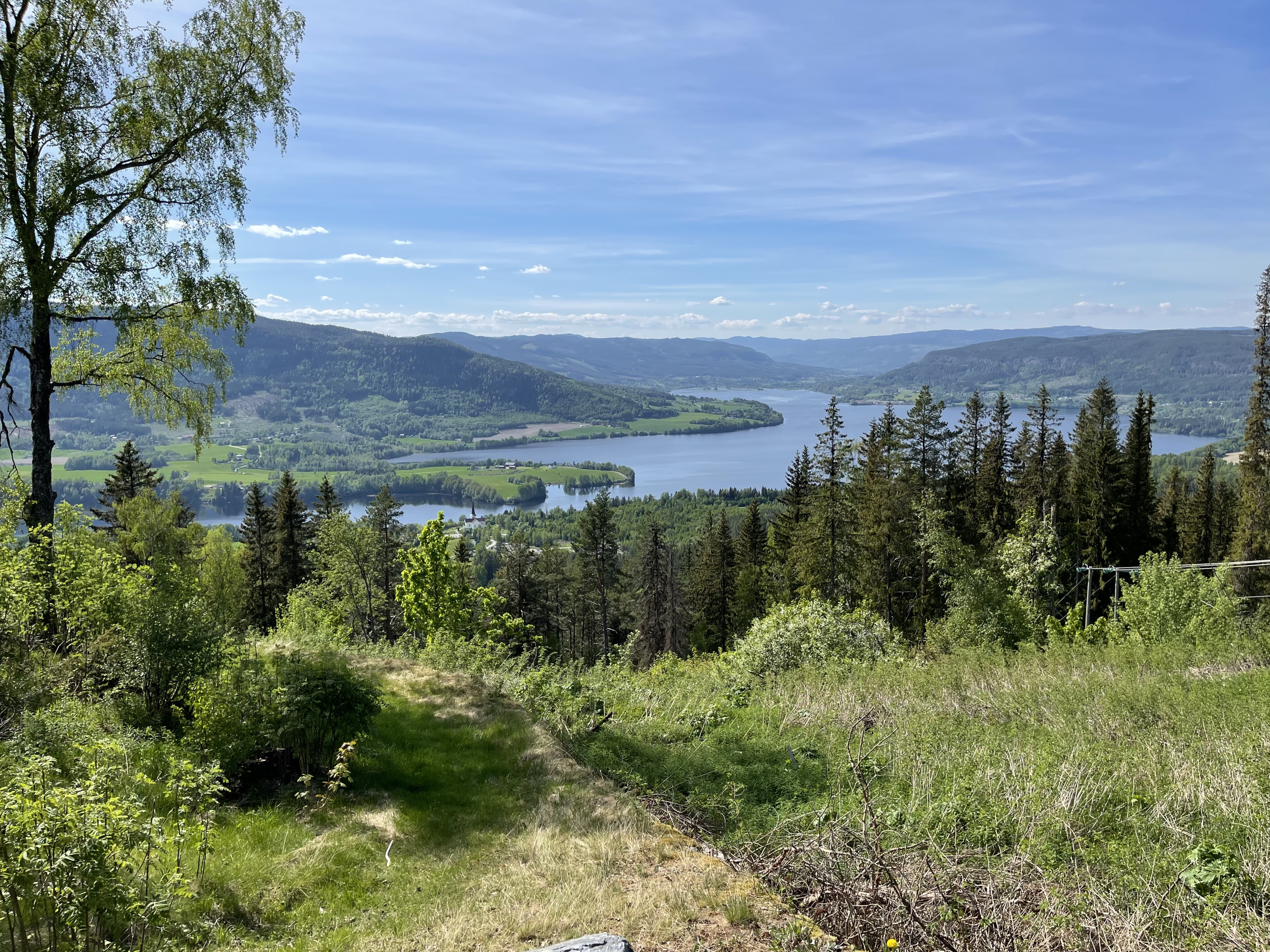
- View of the north end of the Randsfjorden

- Oppland within Norway

- Land within Oppland
- Coordinates: 60°47′58″N 10°13′32″E
- Country: Norway
- County: Oppland
- District: Land
- Established: 1 January 1838
  - Created as: Formannskapsdistrikt
- Disestablished: 1 January 1847
  - Succeeded by: Nordre Land Municipality and Søndre Land Municipality
- Administrative centre: Fluberg

Government
  - Mayor (1840-1847): Ole Hannibal Lie

Area (upon dissolution)
  - Total: 1,684 km^{2} (650 sq mi)
  - Land: 1,580 km^{2} (610 sq mi)
  - Water: 104 km^{2} (40 sq mi)
- Highest elevation: 1,414.39 m (4,640.4 ft)

Population (1847)
  - Total: 9,199
  - Density: 5.82/km^{2} (15.1/sq mi)
- Demonym: Landing
- Time zone: UTC+01:00 (CET)
  - Summer (DST): UTC+02:00 (CEST)
- ISO 3166 code: NO-0536

Land is a former municipality in the old Oppland county, Norway. The municipality existed from 1838 until its dissolution in 1847. The area is now divided between Nordre Land Municipality and Søndre Land Municipality. The administrative centre was the village of Fluberg. The municipality encompassed the whole area of the historical district of Land.

Prior to its dissolution in 1847, the 1,684-square-kilometre (650 sq mi) municipality had a population of about 9,199. The municipality's population density was 5.5 inhabitants per square kilometre (14/sq mi).

== General information ==
The municipality of Land was established on 1 January 1838 (see Formannskapsdistrikt law). The municipality was not long-lived. In 1847, the municipality was divided into Nordre Land Municipality (population: 4,595) and Søndre Land Municipality (population: 4,604).

=== Name ===
The municipality after the historical district of Land (Old Norse: Land) which was once a petty kingdom of its own. The name is identical to the word land which means "land".

=== Churches ===
The Church of Norway had one parish (sokn) within Land Municipality. At the time of the municipal dissolution, it was part of the Land prestegjeld and the Toten og Valdres prosti (deanery) in the Diocese of Christiania.

Churches in Land Municipality
Parish (sokn)	Church name	Location of the church	Year built
Fluberg	Fluberg Church	Fluberg	1703
Lunde	Lunde Church	Lunde	1769
Nordsinni	Nordsinni Church	Nordsinni	1758
Søndre Land	Hov Church	Hov	1781
Torpa	Åmot Church	Fagerlund	1823
Østsinni	Østsinni Church	Dokka	1877

== Geography ==
The municipality was located in the traditional district of Land, Norway. Gausdal Municipality was to the north, Faaberg Municipality was to the northeast, Biri Municipality and Vardal Municipality were to the east, Vestre Toten Municipality was to the southeast, Gran Municipality was to the south, Norderhov Municipality was to the southeast (in Buskerud county), Søndre Aurdal Municipality was to the west, and Nordre Aurdal Municipality was to the northwest. The highest point in the municipality was the 1,414.39-metre (4,640.4 ft) tall mountain Spåtind in the far northern part of the municipality.

== Government ==
While it existed, Land Municipality was governed by a municipal council of directly elected representatives. The mayor was indirectly elected by a vote of the municipal council.

=== Mayors ===
The mayor (Norwegian: ordfører) of Land Municipality was the political leader of the municipality and the chairperson of the municipal council. The following people have held this position:

- 1837–1839: Peder Pavels Aabel
- 1839–1840: Anton Elias Smidt
- 1840–1848: Ole Hannibal Lie

== See also ==
- List of former municipalities of Norway
