= Landåsbygda Church =

Church in Innlandet, Norway

- Landåsbygda kirke
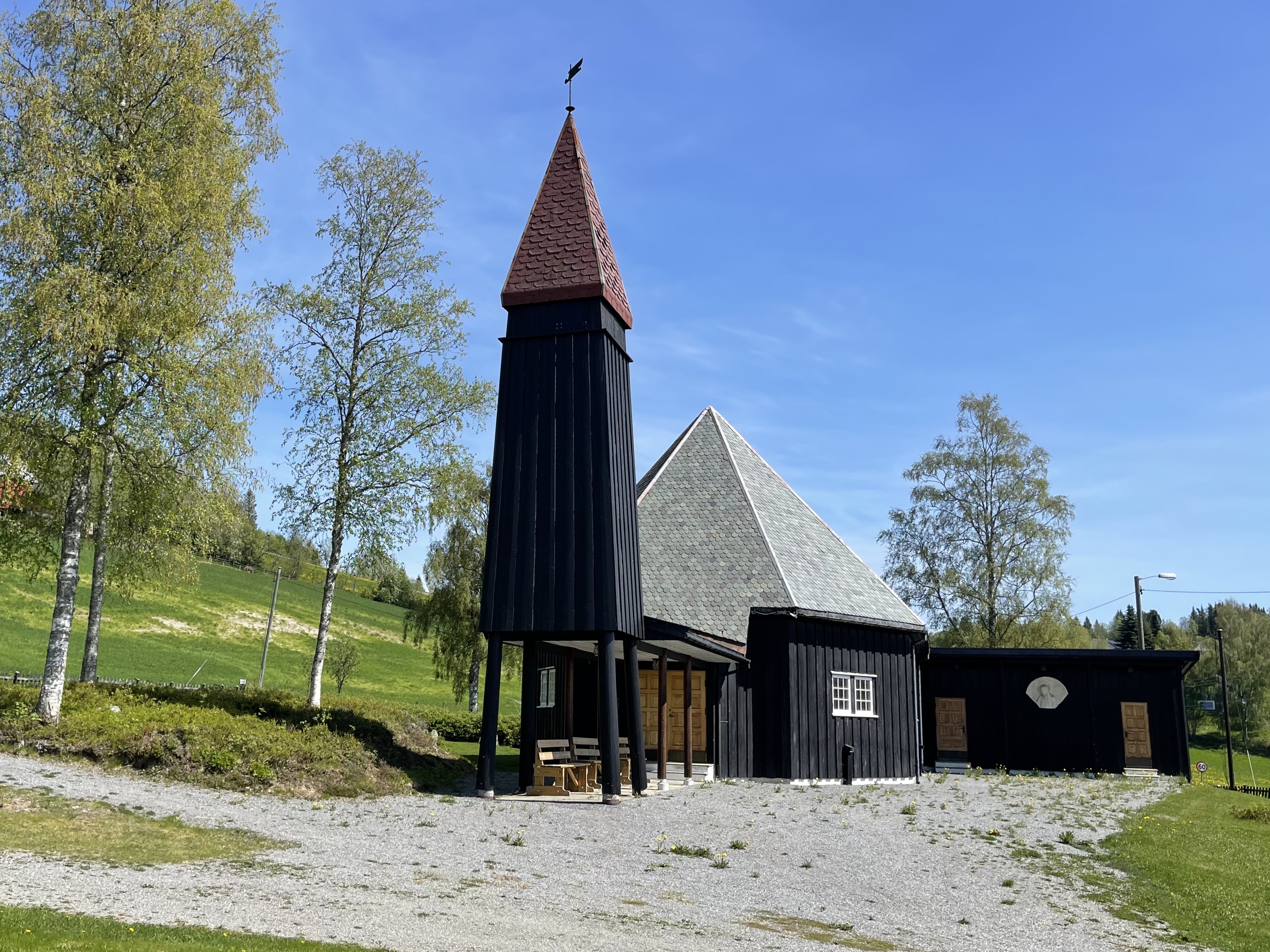
- View of the church
- Landåsbygda Church
- 60°50′00″N 10°17′46″E
- Location: Søndre Land, Innlandet
- Country: Norway
- Denomination: Church of Norway
- Churchmanship: Evangelical Lutheran

History
- Former name: Landåsbygda kapell
- Status: Parish church
- Founded: 1965
- Consecrated: 1965

Architecture
- Functional status: Active
- Architect: Per Nordan
- Architectural type: Long church
- Completed: 1965 (61 years ago)

Specifications
- Capacity: 190
- Materials: Wood

Administration
- Diocese: Hamar bispedømme
- Deanery: Hadeland og Land prosti
- Parish: Fluberg
- Norwegian Cultural Heritage Site
- Type: Church
- Status: Not protected
- ID: 84894

Landåsbygda Church (Norwegian: Landåsbygda kirke) is a parish church of the Church of Norway in Søndre Land Municipality in Innlandet county, Norway. It is located in the village of Landåsbygda. It is one of the churches for the Fluberg parish which is part of the Hadeland og Land prosti (deanery) in the Diocese of Hamar. The brown, wooden church was built in a long church design in 1965 using plans drawn up by the architect Per Nordan. The church seats about 190 people.

== History ==
During the early 1960s, planning began for an annex chapel for the northern parts of Søndre Land Municipality. The new chapel would be subordinate to the main Fluberg Church. The parish hired Per Nordan to design the new wooden building. It has a long church design, but the whole building is shaped like an elongated octagon. The new building was completed and consecrated in 1965. Around the turn of the 21st century, the chapel was re-titled as a church within the Fluberg parish.

== Media gallery ==
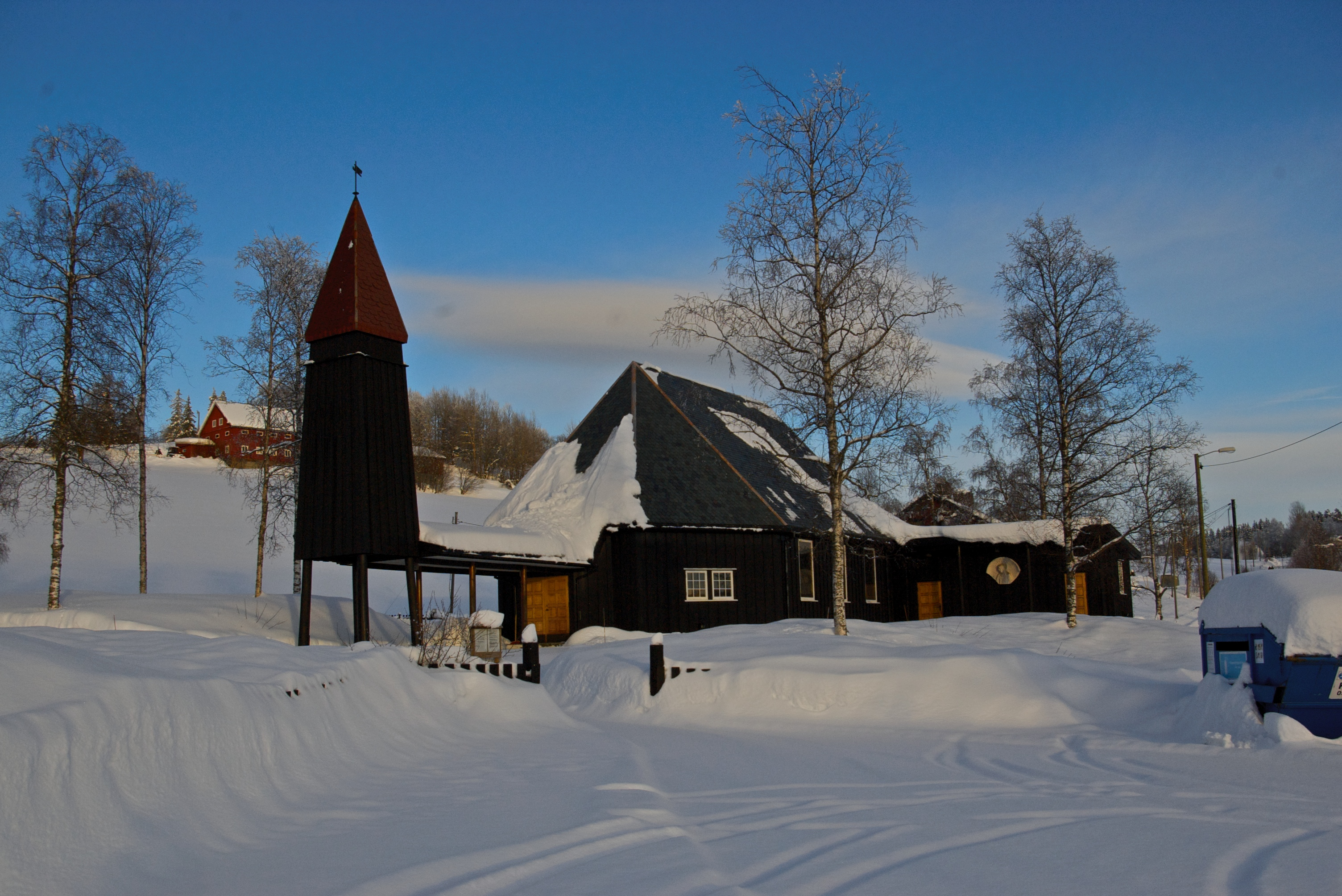

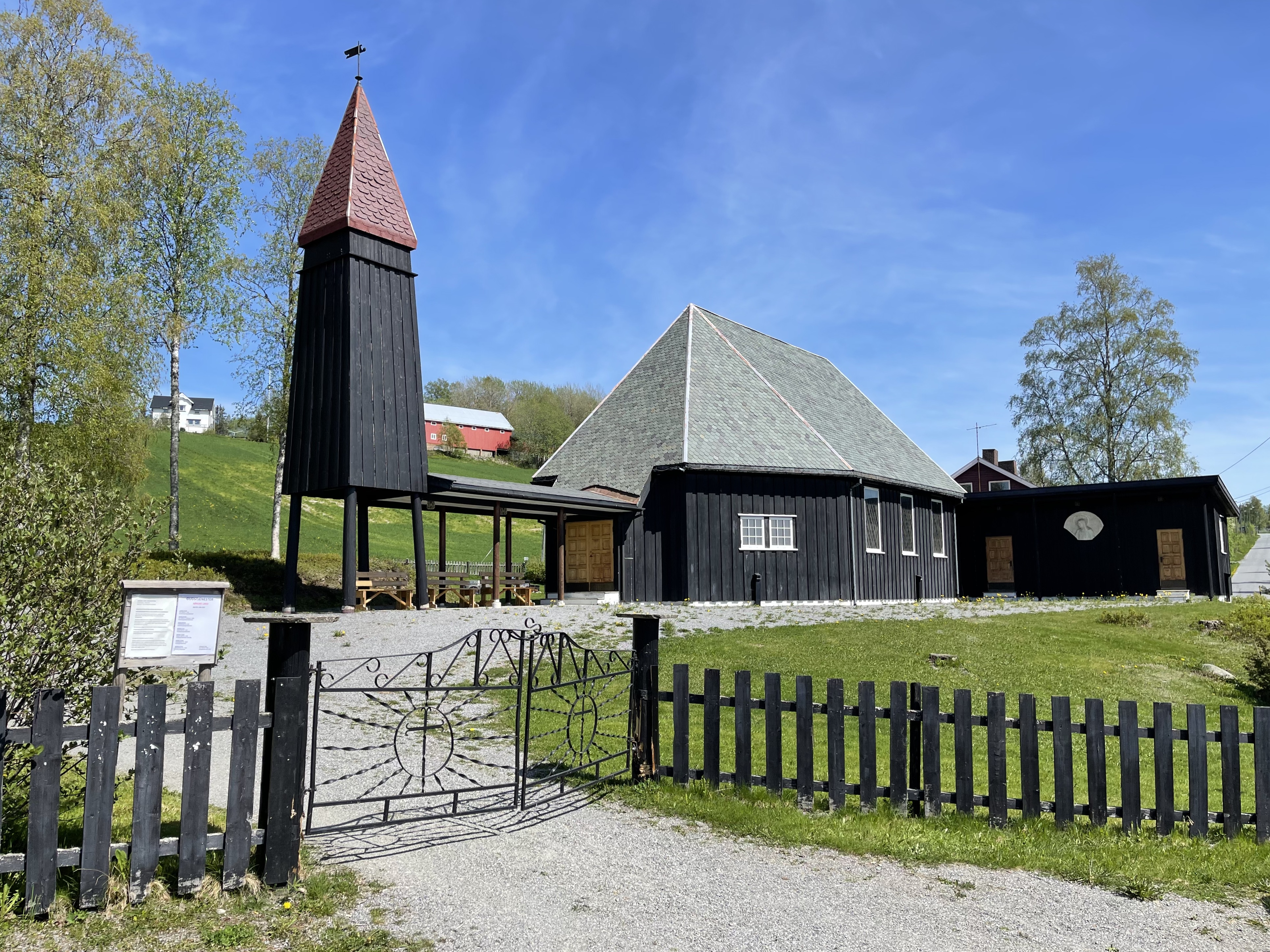

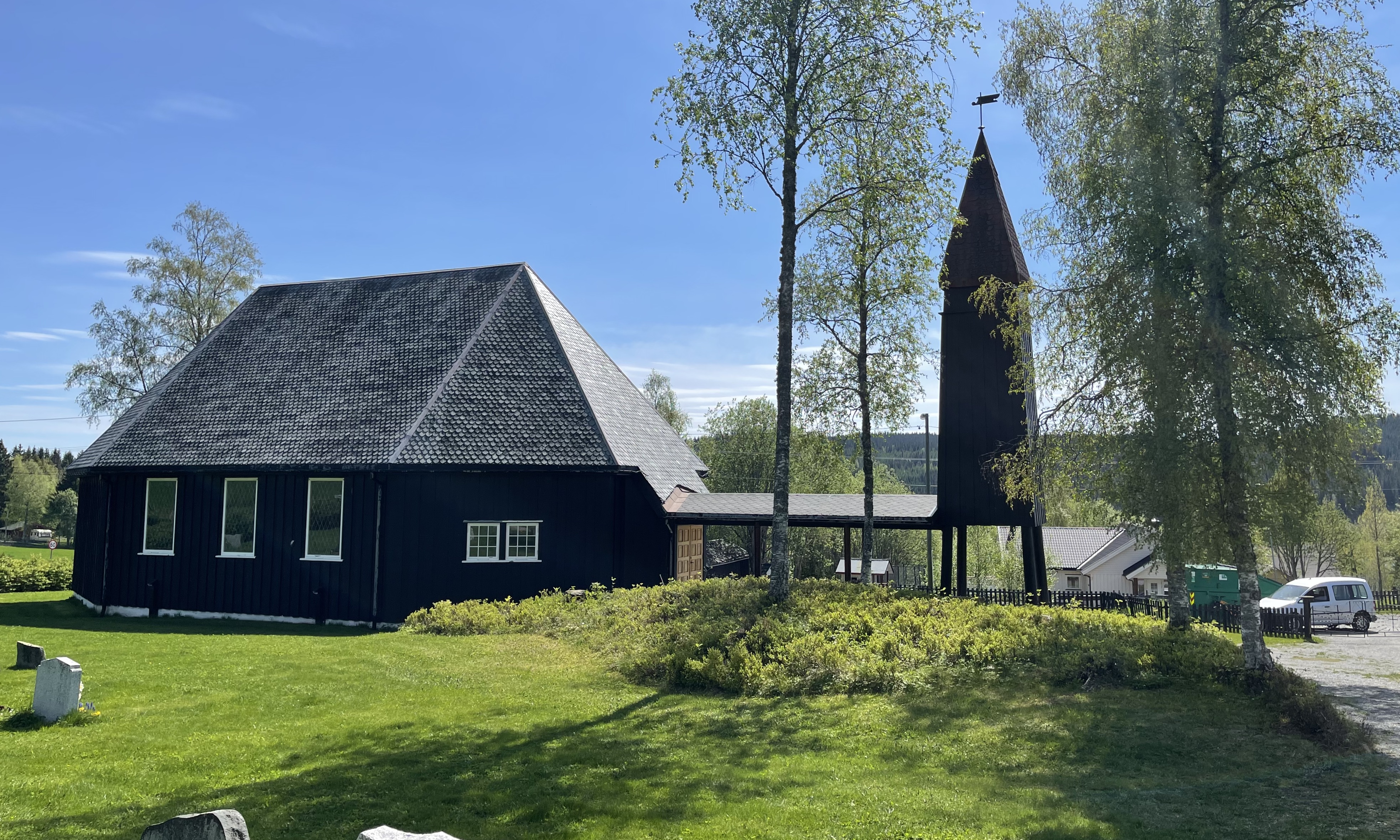

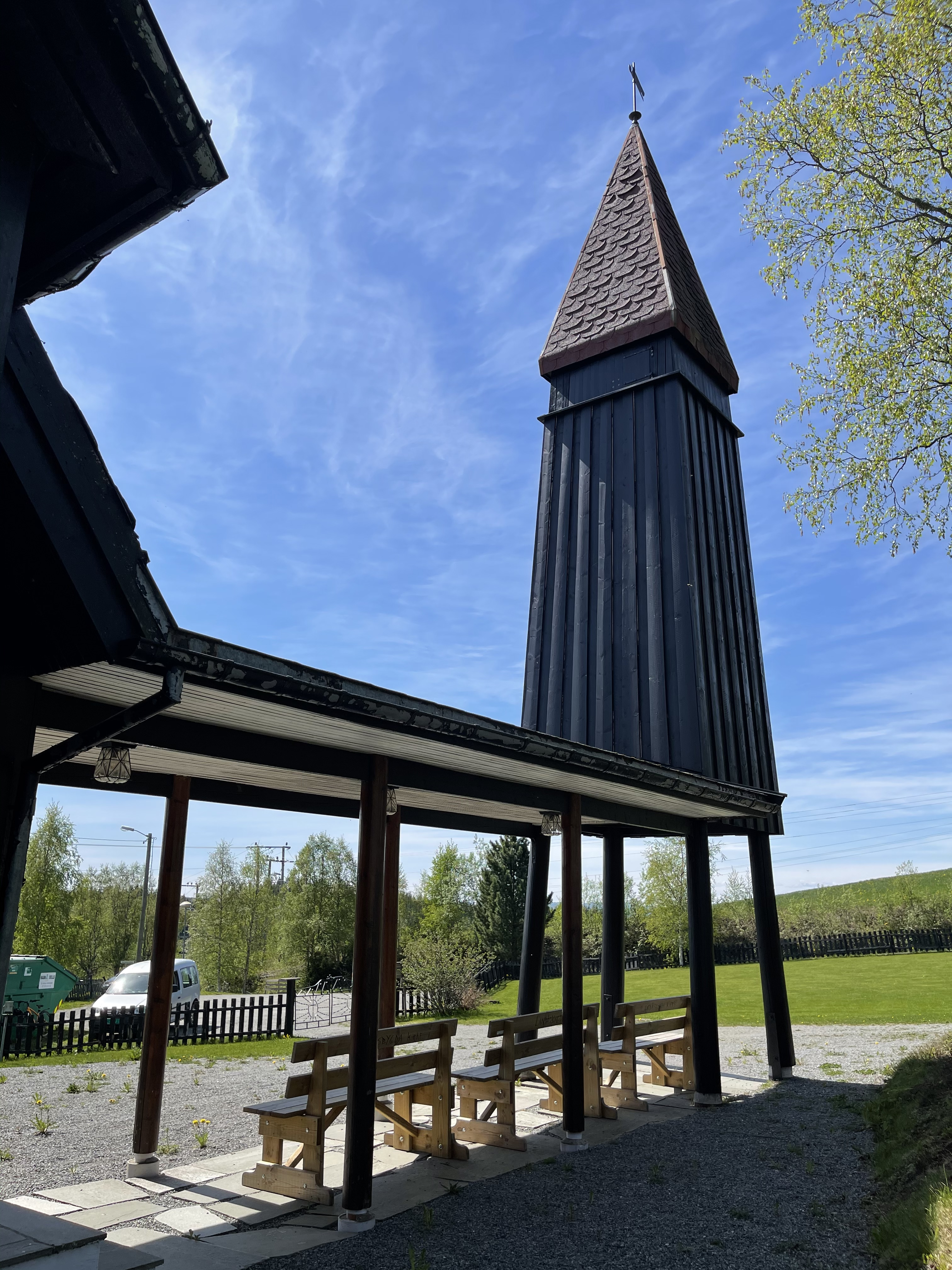
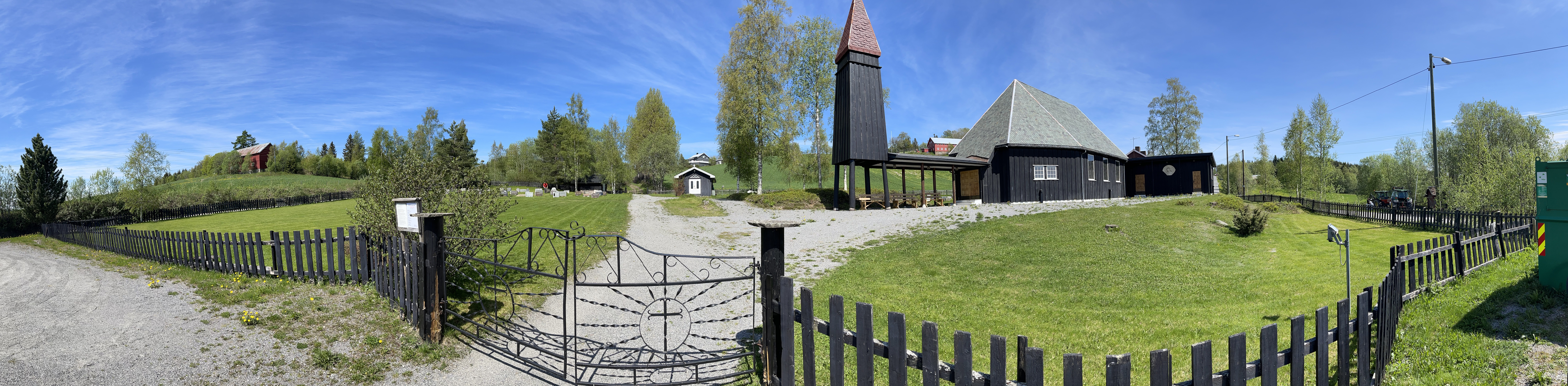
Panoramic view

== See also ==
- List of churches in Hamar
