= Fluberg =

Village in Søndre Land, Norway

- Village
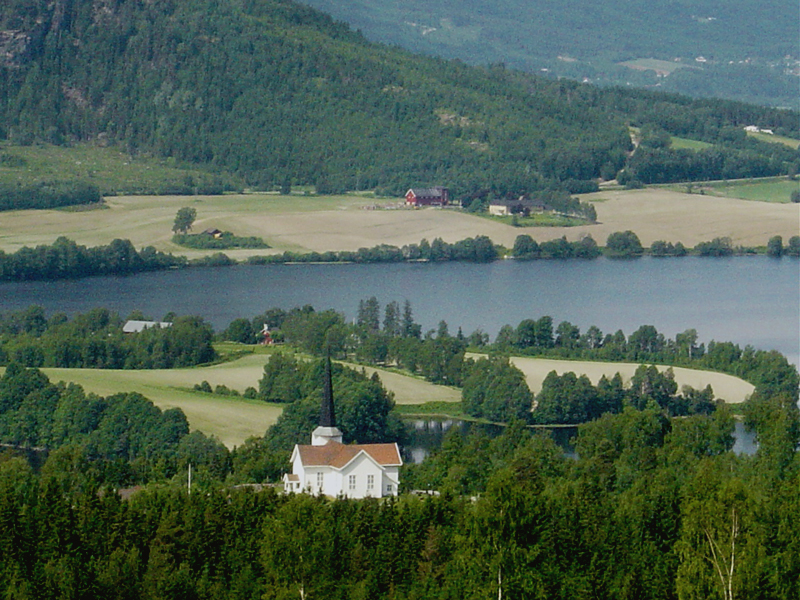
- View of the village
- Interactive map of Fluberg
- Location within Innlandet Location within Norway
- Coordinates: 60.76822°N 10.24773°E
- Country: Norway
- Region: Eastern Norway
- County: Innlandet
- District: Land
- Municipality: Søndre Land Municipality
- Elevation: 182 m (597 ft)
- Time zone: UTC+01:00 (CET)
  - Summer (DST): UTC+02:00 (CEST)
- Post Code: 2862 Fluberg

Fluberg is a village in Søndre Land Municipality in Innlandet county, Norway. The village is located near the north end of the Randsfjorden, about 10 kilometres (6.2 mi) north of the village of Hov and about 15 kilometres (9.3 mi) to the southeast of the village of Dokka. The village was the administrative centre of the old Fluberg Municipality which existed from 1914 until 1962.

== History ==
=== Name ===
The village (originally the parish) was named after the old Fluberg farm (Old Norse: Fluguberg), since the first Fluberg Church was built there. The first element seems to be the genitive case of an old river name Fluga, and the last element is berg which means "mountain". The (hypothetical) river name Fluga could be derived from the word fluga which means "fly" (as in 'the river makes sounds like a fly'), or from the word flug which means "steep side of a mountain".

=== Fluberg Church ===
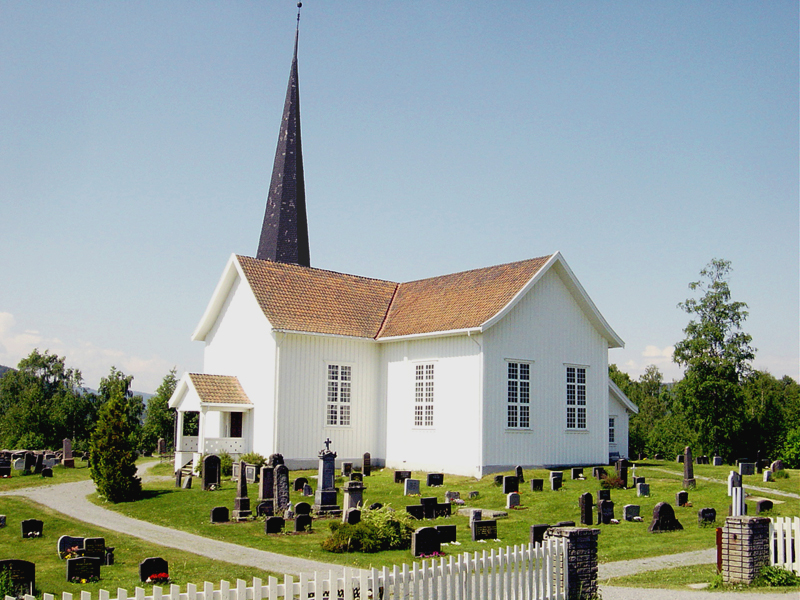
Fluberg Church

Fluberg Church (Fluberg Kirke) is the oldest existing church in Søndre Land Municipality. The present church replaced a previous stave church on the same site. This was the main church for both Nordre Land and Søndre Land until 1866. The present church was built of timber in 1703. The pulpit from 1702 was carved by Lars Jenssen Borg (d. 1710). The baptismal font was made by his son, Nicolai Larsen Borg (1673-1764) and is from 1721. In 1751, Lars Pinnerud (1700–1762) carved a new altar for the church. The following year it was painted by Eggert Munch (ca. 1685-1764).

== Notable people ==
- Ola Viker (1897–1972), a novelist and lawyer
- Øyvind Myhre, an author of science fiction and fantasy literature
- Johan Peter Weisse (1832–1886), a philologist
