= Fluberg Municipality =

Former municipality in Oppland, Norway

Fluberg Municipality Fluberg herred
- Former municipality
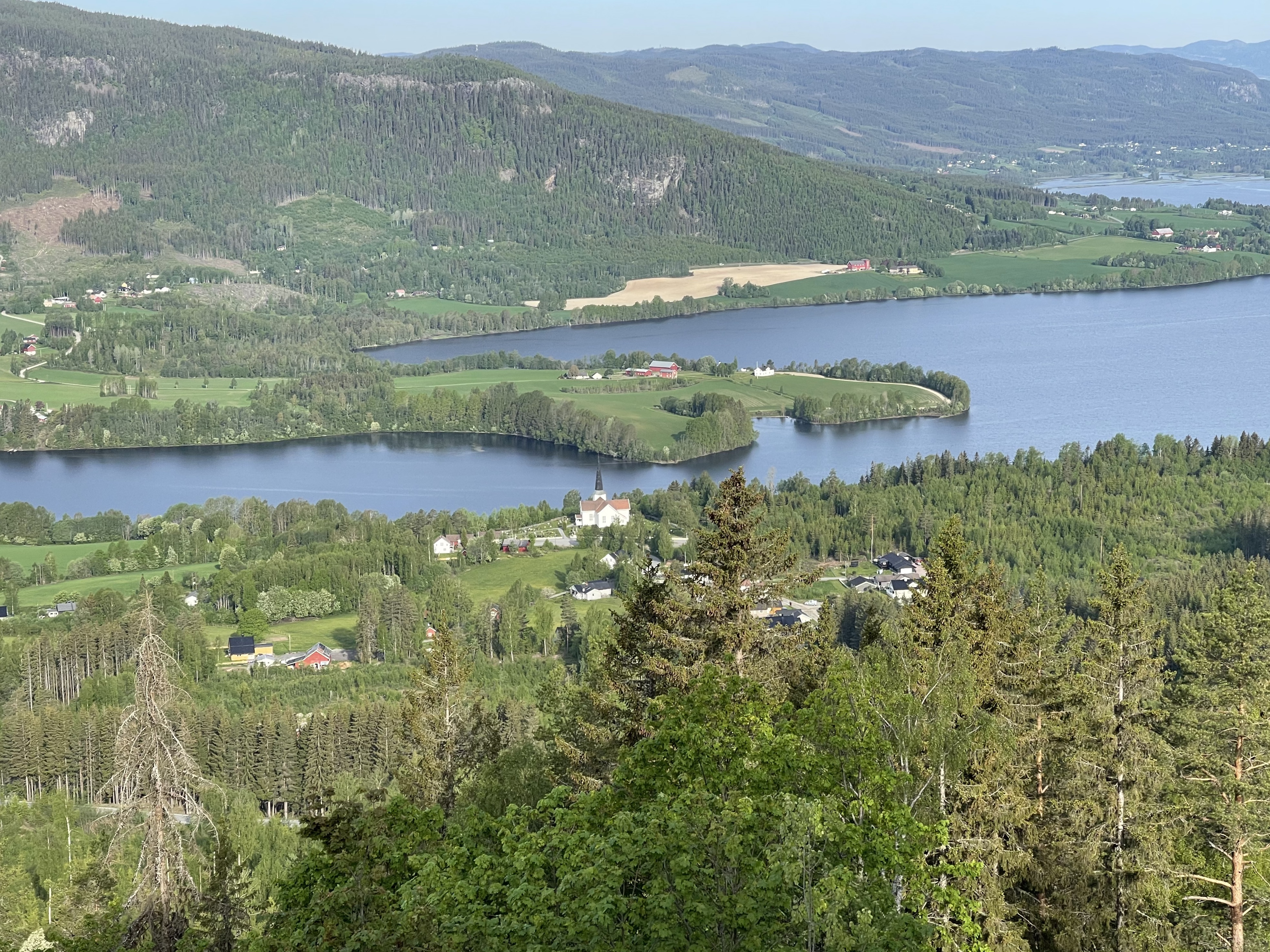
- View of the Fluberg Church and surroundings

- Oppland within Norway

- Fluberg within Oppland
- Coordinates: 60°46′06″N 10°14′52″E
- Country: Norway
- County: Oppland
- District: Land
- Established: 1 Jan 1914
  - Preceded by: Søndre Land Municipality
- Disestablished: 1 Jan 1962
  - Succeeded by: Søndre Land and Nordre Land
- Administrative centre: Fluberg

Government
  - Mayor (1938–1961): Niels Minaberg (Ap)

Area (upon dissolution)
  - Total: 260.40 km^{2} (100.54 sq mi)
  - Rank: #322 in Norway
- Highest elevation: 860.42 m (2,822.9 ft)

Population (1961)
  - Total: 2,338
  - Rank: #397 in Norway
  - Density: 9/km^{2} (23/sq mi)
  - Change (10 years): ▲ +3.5%

Official language
  - Norwegian form: Neutral
- Time zone: UTC+01:00 (CET)
  - Summer (DST): UTC+02:00 (CEST)
- ISO 3166 code: NO-0537

Fluberg is a former municipality in the old Oppland county, Norway. The 260.4-square-kilometre (100.5 sq mi) municipality existed from 1914 until its dissolution in 1962. The area is now mostly part of Søndre Land Municipality in the traditional district of Land. The administrative centre was the village of Fluberg.

Prior to its dissolution in 1962, the 260.4-square-kilometre (100.5 sq mi) municipality was the 322nd largest by area out of the 731 municipalities in Norway. Fluberg Municipality was the 397th most populous municipality in Norway with a population of about 2,338. The municipality's population density was 9 inhabitants per square kilometre (23/sq mi) and its population had increased by 3.5% over the previous 10-year period.

== General information ==
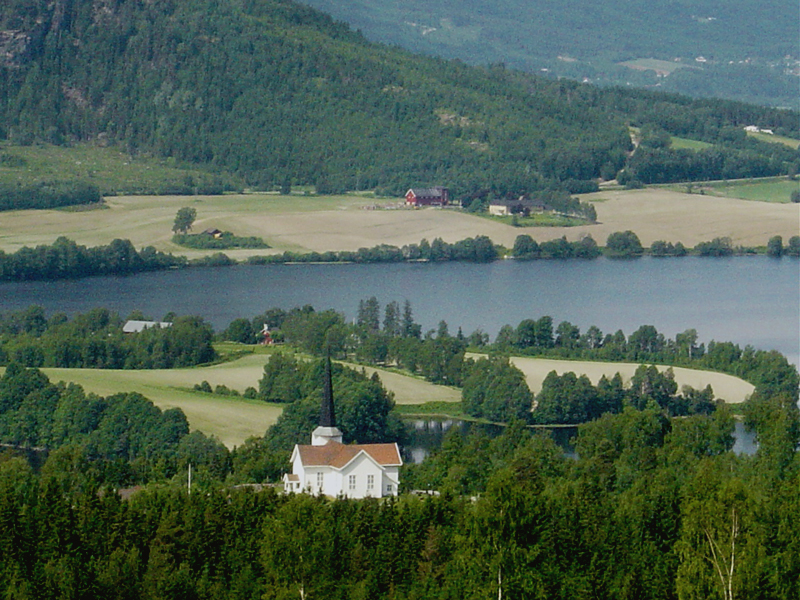
View of the local church

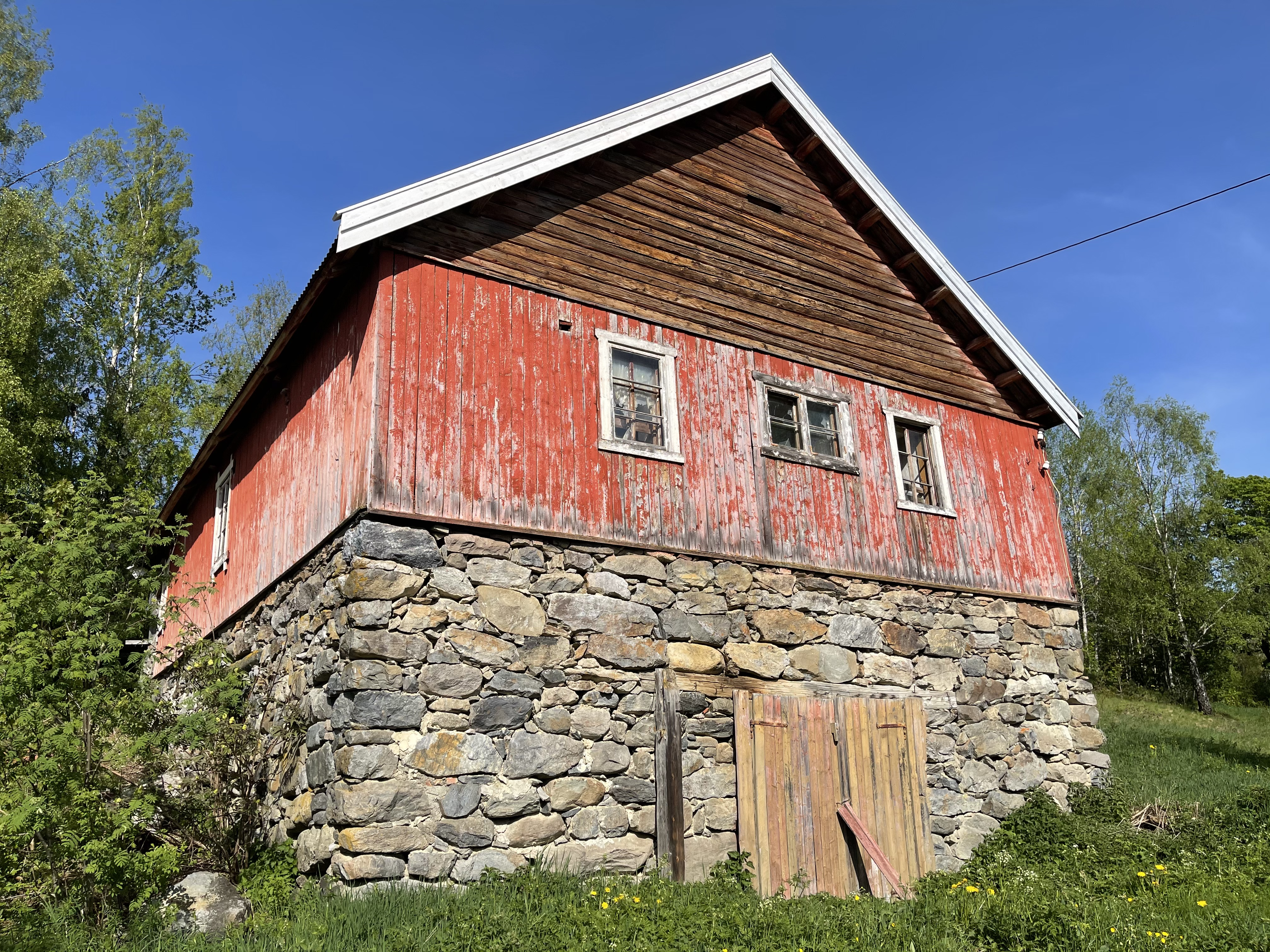
Granum farm in Fluberg

The municipality of Fluberg was established on 1 January 1914 when it was split from Søndre Land Municipality. Initially, the new municipality had 2,027 residents. During the 1960s, there were many municipal mergers across Norway due to the work of the Schei Committee. On 1 January 1962, Fluberg Municipality was dissolved and its lands and people were divided between the neighboring municipalities. The Tranlia and Store Røen areas (population: 196) joined Nordre Land Municipality to the north and the rest of Fluberg Municipality (population: 2,110) became part of Søndre Land Municipality.

=== Name ===
The municipality (originally the parish) is named after the old Fluberg farm (Old Norse: Fluguberg) since the first Fluberg Church was built there. The first element is likely the genitive case of an old local river name, Fluga. This river name could come from the word fluga which means "fly" (as in 'the river sounds like a fly') or from the word flug which means "steep side of a mountain". The last element is berg which means "mountain" or "rock".

=== Churches ===
The Church of Norway had one parish (sokn) within Fluberg Municipality. At the time of the municipal dissolution, it was part of the Søndre Land prestegjeld and the Hadeland og Land prosti (deanery) in the Diocese of Hamar.

Churches in Fluberg Municipality
Parish (sokn)	Church name	Location of the church	Year built
Fluberg Church	Fluberg Church	Fluberg	1703

== Geography ==
It encompassed both sides of the northern part of the large lake Randsfjorden. Nordre Land Municipality was to the north, Snertingdal Municipality was to the northeast, Vardal Municipality was located to the east, Søndre Land Municipality was to the south, and Sør-Aurdal Municipality was to the west.

The highest point in the municipality was the 860.42-metre (2,822.9 ft) tall mountain Vesle Skjellingshovde, a tripoint on the border of Fluberg Municipality, Sør-Aurdal Municipality, and Nordre Land Municipality.

== Government ==
While it existed, Fluberg Municipality was responsible for primary education (through 10th grade), outpatient health services, senior citizen services, welfare and other social services, zoning, economic development, and municipal roads and utilities. The municipality was governed by a municipal council of directly elected representatives. The mayor was indirectly elected by a vote of the municipal council. The municipality was under the jurisdiction of the Eidsivating Court of Appeal.

=== Municipal council ===
The municipal council (Herredsstyre) of Fluberg Municipality was made up of 17 representatives that were elected to four-year terms. The tables below show the historical composition of the council by political party.

Fluberg herredsstyre 1959–1961
Party name (in Norwegian)	Number of representatives
Labour Party (Arbeiderpartiet)	11
Communist Party (Kommunistiske Parti)	2
Centre Party (Senterpartiet)	1
Liberal Party (Venstre)	3
Total number of members:	17
Note: On 1 January 1962, Fluberg Municipality was divided and became part of Nordre Land Municipality and Søndre Land Municipality.

Fluberg herredsstyre 1955–1959
Party name (in Norwegian)	Number of representatives
Labour Party (Arbeiderpartiet)	10
Communist Party (Kommunistiske Parti)	2
Liberal Party (Venstre)	3
Joint List(s) of Non-Socialist Parties (Borgerlige Felleslister)	2
Total number of members:	17

Fluberg herredsstyre 1951–1955
Party name (in Norwegian)	Number of representatives
Labour Party (Arbeiderpartiet)	8
Communist Party (Kommunistiske Parti)	3
Farmers' Party (Bondepartiet)	1
Joint List(s) of Non-Socialist Parties (Borgerlige Felleslister)	4
Total number of members:	16

Fluberg herredsstyre 1947–1951
Party name (in Norwegian)	Number of representatives
Labour Party (Arbeiderpartiet)	9
Communist Party (Kommunistiske Parti)	4
Farmers' Party (Bondepartiet)	1
Joint list of the Liberal Party (Venstre) and the Radical People's Party (Radikale Folkepartiet)	2
Total number of members:	16

Fluberg herredsstyre 1945–1947
Party name (in Norwegian)	Number of representatives
Labour Party (Arbeiderpartiet)	9
Communist Party (Kommunistiske Parti)	4
Farmers' Party (Bondepartiet)	1
Local List(s) (Lokale lister)	2
Total number of members:	16

Fluberg herredsstyre 1937–1941*
Party name (in Norwegian)	Number of representatives
Labour Party (Arbeiderpartiet)	11
Radical People's Party (Radikale Folkepartiet)	3
Farmers' Party (Bondepartiet)	2
Total number of members:	16
Note: Due to the German occupation of Norway during World War II, no elections were held for new municipal councils until after the war ended in 1945.

=== Mayors ===
The mayor (Norwegian: ordfører) of Fluberg Municipality was the political leader of the municipality and the chairperson of the municipal council. The following people have held this position:

- 1914–1919: Torger T. Hagen
- 1920–1928: Fredrik Johansen
- 1929–1931: Oluf Hanvold (V/AD)
- 1932–1934: Christian Odden (Ap)
- 1935–1937: Martinius Hagen (V)
- 1938–1961: Niels Minaberg (Ap)

== See also ==
- List of former municipalities of Norway
