= Anne Hagenborg =

Norwegian politician

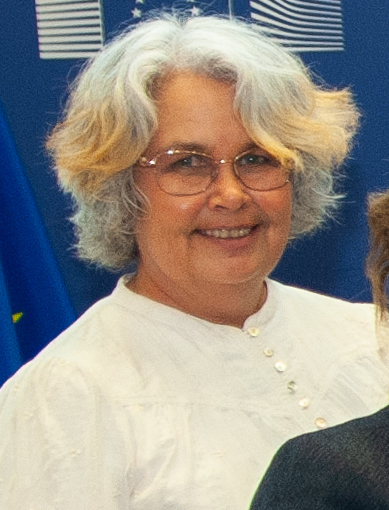

Member of the Storting
- Incumbent
- Assumed office 2025
- Constituency: Oppland

Personal details
- Born: 16 November 1971 (age 54)
- Party: Labour

Anne Hagenborg (born 16 November 1971) is a Norwegian politician from the Labour Party (Ap).

== Career ==
Hagenborg became mayor of Søndre Land Municipality after the 2019 Norwegian local elections and was re-elected in 2023. She was elected to the Storting in the 2025 Norwegian parliamentary election.

== See also ==
- List of members of the Storting, 2025–2029
