= Lars Pinnerud =

Norwegian farmer and woodcarver

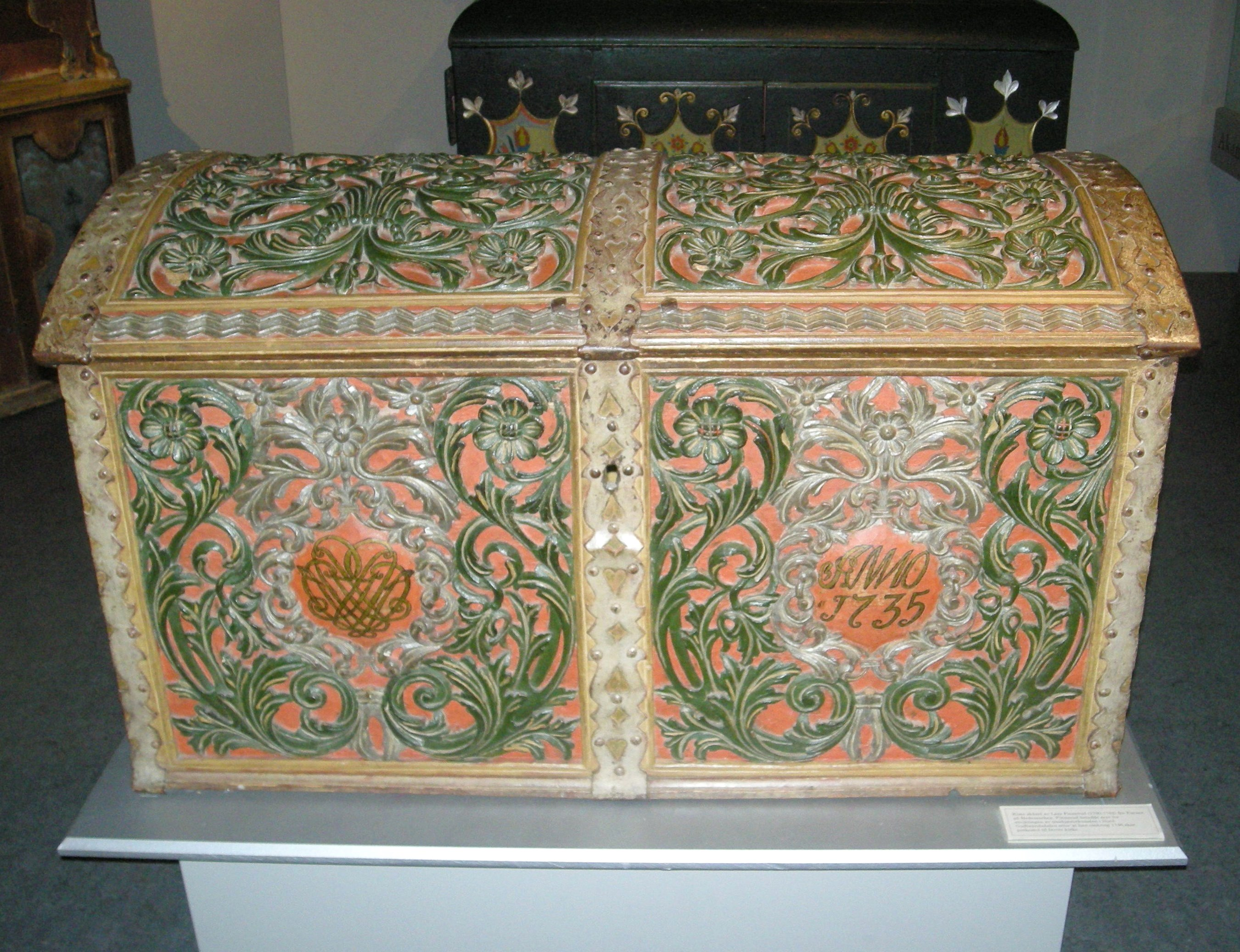
Chest carved by Lars Pinnerud (ca 1735). Now on display at Maihaugen

Lars Pinnerud (18 August 1700 – 1762) was a Norwegian farmer and woodcarver. He was the most prominent woodcarver in Hedmark in the early 18th century. His works influenced later artists in Hedmark and Oppland, in particular in the Gudbrand Valley.

Pinnerud was born in the parish of Furnes in Hedmark, Norway. Among his works were the pulpit and altarpiece of Østsinni Church (Østsinni kirke) in Nordre Lane, from 1725 and interior in Nes Church in Ringsaker. Other works included church interiors at Dovre Church, Hof Church, Stor-Elvdal Church, Ytre Rendal Church, Fluberg Church and Nordsinni Church. One of his cabinets is located at the Norwegian Museum of Cultural History and a chest is on display at Maihaugen.
