= Søndre Land Municipality =

Municipality in Innlandet, Norway

Søndre Land Municipality Søndre Land kommune
- Municipality
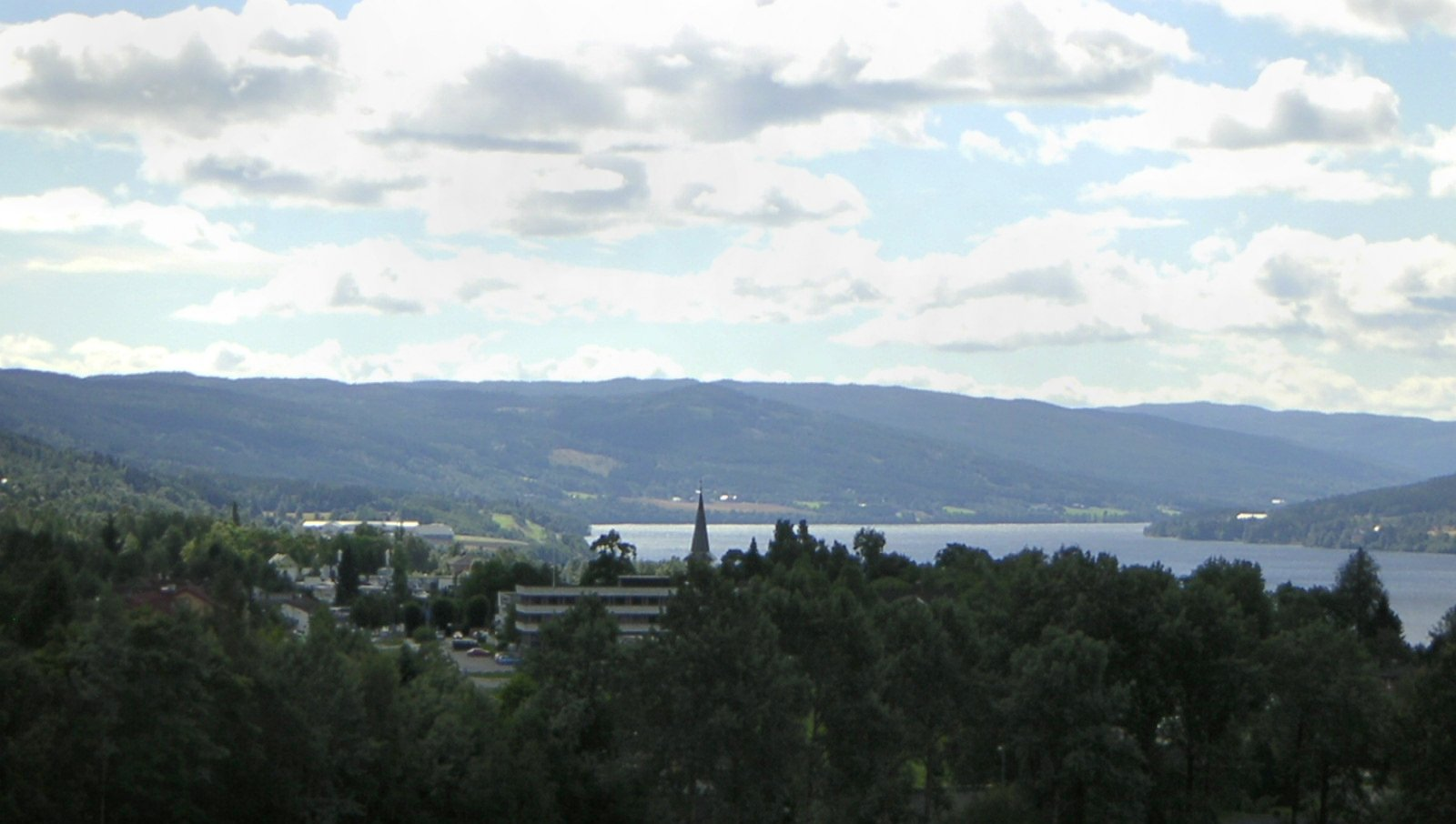

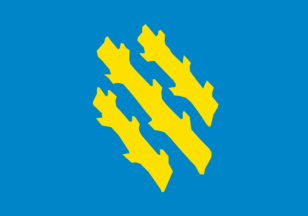
- Flag Coat of arms

- Innlandet within Norway

- Søndre Land within Innlandet
- Coordinates: 60°40′37″N 10°16′44″E
- Country: Norway
- County: Innlandet
- District: Land
- Established: 1847
  - Preceded by: Land Municipality
- Administrative centre: Hov

Government
  - Mayor (2019): Anne Hagenborg (Ap)

Area
  - Total: 728.35 km^{2} (281.22 sq mi)
  - Land: 659.15 km^{2} (254.50 sq mi)
  - Water: 69.20 km^{2} (26.72 sq mi) 9.5%
  - Rank: #156 in Norway
- Highest elevation: 860.42 m (2,822.9 ft)

Population (2025)
  - Total: 5,597
  - Rank: #172 in Norway
  - Density: 7.7/km^{2} (20/sq mi)
  - Change (10 years): ▼ −2%
- Demonym: Søndrelending

Official language
  - Norwegian form: Bokmål
- Time zone: UTC+01:00 (CET)
  - Summer (DST): UTC+02:00 (CEST)
- ISO 3166 code: NO-3447
- Website: Official website

Søndre Land is a municipality in Innlandet county, Norway. It is located in the traditional district of Land. The administrative centre of the municipality is the village of Hov. Other villages in the municipality include Fluberg and Odnes.

The 728.35-square-kilometre (281.22 sq mi) municipality is the 156th largest by area out of the 357 municipalities in Norway. Søndre Land Municipality is the 172nd most populous municipality in Norway with a population of 5,597. The municipality's population density is 7.7 inhabitants per square kilometre (20/sq mi) and its population has decreased by 2% over the previous 10-year period.

== General information ==
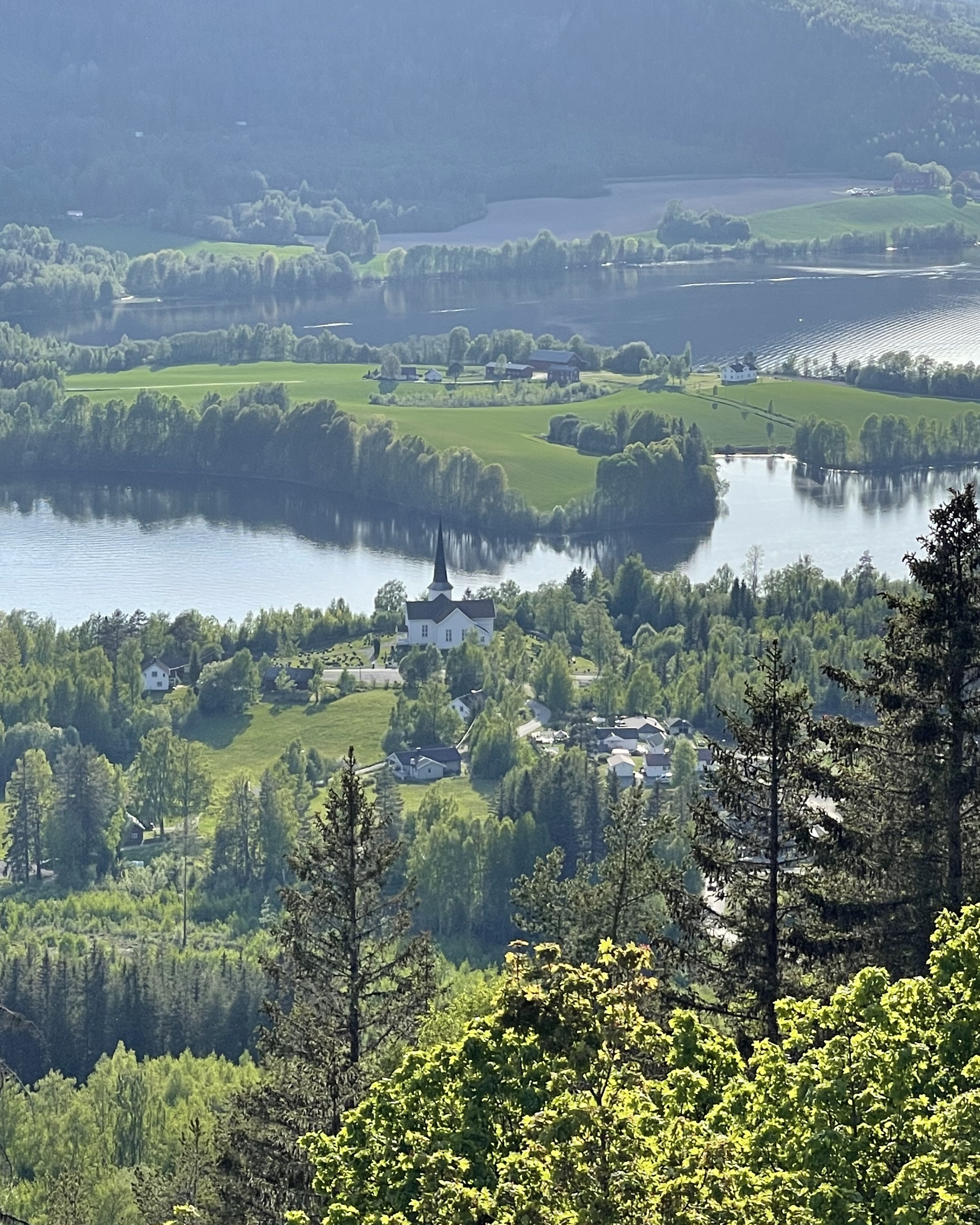
View of the Fluberg Church area

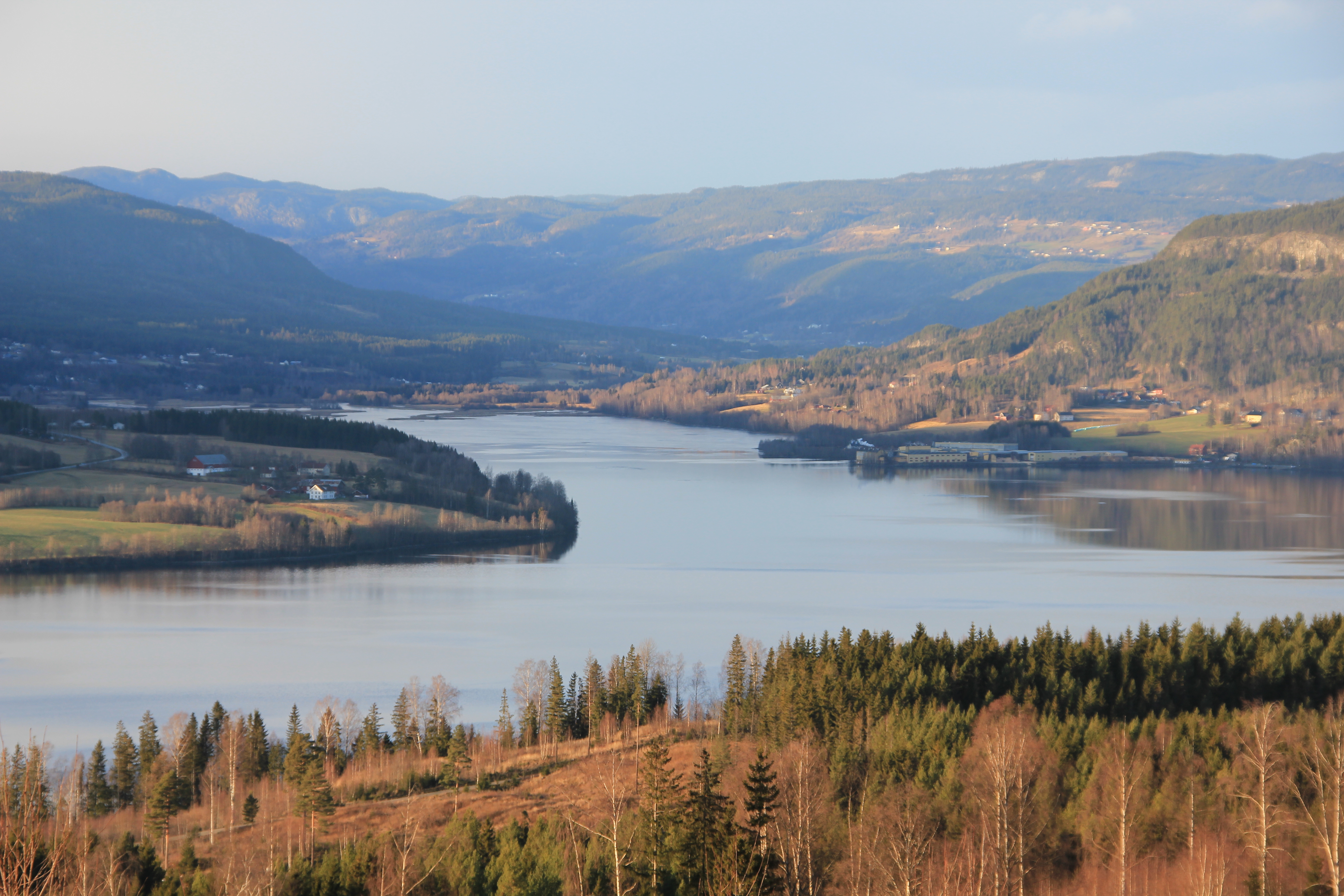
View of the Randsfjorden

The old Land Municipality was established on 1 January 1838 after the formannskapsdistrikt law went into effect. This municipality was quite large and in less than a decade, the municipality was divided. In 1847, the old Land Municipality was divided into Nordre Land Municipality (population: 4,595) in the north and Søndre Land Municipality (population: 4,604) in the south. On 1 January 1868, a small part of Søndre Land Municipality (population: 340) was transferred to Nordre Land Municipality. On 1 January 1900, an unpopulated area of Søndre Land Municipality was transferred to the neighboring Vardal Municipality.

On 1 January 1914, Søndre Land Municipality was divided into two municipalities: Fluberg Municipality (population: 2,027) in the north and Søndre Land Municipality (population: 3,374) in the south. During the 1960s, there were many municipal mergers across Norway due to the work of the Schei Committee. On 1 January 1962, Søndre Land Municipality (population: 4,339) was merged with most of the neighboring Fluberg Municipality (population: 2,110).

Historically, this municipality was part of the old Oppland county. On 1 January 2020, the municipality became a part of the newly-formed Innlandet county (after Hedmark and Oppland counties were merged).

=== Name ===
The municipality (originally the parish) is named after the historical district of Land (Old Norse: Land) which was once a petty kingdom of its own. The name is identical to the word land which means "land". In 1847, when the old Land Municipality was divided, the municipality was named Søndre Land, using the old name plus the word søndre which means "southern", therefore the name means "(the) southern (part of) Land".

=== Coat of arms ===
The coat of arms was granted on 21 June 1985. The official blazon is "Azure, three branched tree trunks in bend Or" (Norwegian: I blått tre skråstilte kvistede gull trestammer). This means the arms have a blue field (background) and the charge is three branched tree trunks lined up diagonally. The charge has a tincture of Or which means it is commonly colored yellow, but if it is made out of metal, then gold is used. The blue color in the field symbolizes the water of the Randsfjorden which dominates the central part of the municipality. The tree trunks were chosen to symbolise the importance of forestry and the sawmills in the municipality. The arms were designed by Asbjørn Fladsrud. The municipal flag has the same design as the coat of arms.

=== Churches ===
The Church of Norway has three parishes (sokn) within Søndre Land Municipality. It is part of the Hadeland og Land prosti (deanery) in the Diocese of Hamar.

Churches in Søndre Land Municipality
Parish (sokn)	Church name	Location of the church	Year built
Fluberg	Fluberg Church	Fluberg	1703
Fluberg	Landåsbygda Church	Landåsbygda	1965
Skute	Skute Church	Ringelia	1915
Søndre Land	Enger Church	Enger	1875
Søndre Land	Hov Church	Hov	1781

== Geography ==
Number of minorities (1st and 2nd generation) in Søndre Land by country of origin in 2017
Ancestry	Number
Poland	77
Somalia	57
Netherlands	36
Eritrea	32
Denmark	24
Germany	22
Afghanistan	18

Søndre Land is bordered on the north by Nordre Land Municipality, on the east by Gjøvik Municipality and Vestre Toten Municipality, on the west by Sør-Aurdal Municipality, and on the south by Gran Municipality in Innlandet county. It is also bordered to the west by Ringerike Municipality in Buskerud county.

Søndre Land is 39.2 kilometres (24.4 mi) on a north–south axis and 31.3 kilometres (19.4 mi) east-west. It lies in the south of Innlandet and on the northern end of the 4th largest lake in Norway, Randsfjorden. The highest point in the municipality is the 860.42-metre (2,822.9 ft) tall mountain Vesle Skjellingshovde, a tripoint on the border of Søndre Land Municipality, Nordre Land Municipality, and Sør-Aurdal Municipality. The lake Vestre Bjonevatnet lies in the southwestern corner of the municipality.

== Government ==
Søndre Land Municipality is responsible for primary education (through 10th grade), outpatient health services, senior citizen services, welfare and other social services, zoning, economic development, and municipal roads and utilities. The municipality is governed by a municipal council of directly elected representatives. The mayor is indirectly elected by a vote of the municipal council. The municipality is under the jurisdiction of the Vestoppland og Valdres District Court and the Eidsivating Court of Appeal.

=== Municipal council ===
The municipal council (Kommunestyre) of Søndre Land Municipality is made up of 17 representatives that are elected to four year terms. The tables below show the current and historical composition of the council by political party.

Søndre Land kommunestyre 2023–2027
Party name (in Norwegian)	Number of representatives
Labour Party (Arbeiderpartiet)	11
Progress Party (Fremskrittspartiet)	1
Conservative Party (Høyre)	3
Red Party (Rødt)	1
Centre Party (Senterpartiet)	2
Socialist Left Party (Sosialistisk Venstreparti)	1
Liberal Party (Venstre)	1
Søndre Land local list (Søndre Land Bygdeliste)	5
Total number of members:	17

Søndre Land kommunestyre 2019–2023
Party name (in Norwegian)	Number of representatives
Labour Party (Arbeiderpartiet)	9
Conservative Party (Høyre)	4
Red Party (Rødt)	1
Centre Party (Senterpartiet)	4
Socialist Left Party (Sosialistisk Venstreparti)	1
Liberal Party (Venstre)	1
Søndre Land local list (Søndre Land Bygdeliste)	5
Total number of members:	25

Søndre Land kommunestyre 2015–2019
Party name (in Norwegian)	Number of representatives
Labour Party (Arbeiderpartiet)	10
Progress Party (Fremskrittspartiet)	1
Green Party (Miljøpartiet De Grønne)	1
Conservative Party (Høyre)	3
Centre Party (Senterpartiet)	3
Socialist Left Party (Sosialistisk Venstreparti)	1
Liberal Party (Venstre)	2
Søndre Land local list (Søndre Land Bygdeliste)	4
Total number of members:	25

Søndre Land kommunestyre 2011–2015
Party name (in Norwegian)	Number of representatives
Labour Party (Arbeiderpartiet)	12
Progress Party (Fremskrittspartiet)	1
Conservative Party (Høyre)	3
Socialist Left Party (Sosialistisk Venstreparti)	2
Joint list of the Centre Party (Senterpartiet), Christian Democratic Party (Kristelig Folkeparti), and Liberal Party (Venstre)	5
Søndre Land local list (Søndre Land Bygdeliste)	2
Total number of members:	25

Søndre Land kommunestyre 2007–2011
Party name (in Norwegian)	Number of representatives
Labour Party (Arbeiderpartiet)	9
Centre Party (Senterpartiet)	2
Socialist Left Party (Sosialistisk Venstreparti)	3
Joint list of the Conservative Party (Høyre) and Christian Democratic Party (Kristelig Folkeparti)	2
Søndre Land local list (Søndre Land bygdeliste)	9
Total number of members:	25

Søndre Land kommunestyre 2003–2007
Party name (in Norwegian)	Number of representatives
Labour Party (Arbeiderpartiet)	9
Conservative Party (Høyre)	1
Centre Party (Senterpartiet)	2
Socialist Left Party (Sosialistisk Venstreparti)	3
Søndre Land local list (Søndre Land Bygdeliste)	10
Total number of members:	25

Søndre Land kommunestyre 1999–2003
Party name (in Norwegian)	Number of representatives
Labour Party (Arbeiderpartiet)	12
Conservative Party (Høyre)	1
Christian Democratic Party (Kristelig Folkeparti)	1
Centre Party (Senterpartiet)	2
Socialist Left Party (Sosialistisk Venstreparti)	2
Liberal Party (Venstre)	1
Søndre Land local list (Søndre Land Bygdeliste)	10
Total number of members:	29

Søndre Land kommunestyre 1995–1999
Party name (in Norwegian)	Number of representatives
Labour Party (Arbeiderpartiet)	14
Conservative Party (Høyre)	1
Centre Party (Senterpartiet)	2
Socialist Left Party (Sosialistisk Venstreparti)	2
Joint list of the Liberal Party (Venstre) and Christian Democratic Party (Kristelig Folkeparti)	1
Søndre Land local list (Søndre Land Bygdeliste)	9
Total number of members:	29

Søndre Land kommunestyre 1991–1995
Party name (in Norwegian)	Number of representatives
Labour Party (Arbeiderpartiet)	17
Progress Party (Fremskrittspartiet)	1
Conservative Party (Høyre)	2
Centre Party (Senterpartiet)	4
Socialist Left Party (Sosialistisk Venstreparti)	4
Liberal Party (Venstre)	1
Total number of members:	29

Søndre Land kommunestyre 1987–1991
Party name (in Norwegian)	Number of representatives
Labour Party (Arbeiderpartiet)	20
Progress Party (Fremskrittspartiet)	2
Conservative Party (Høyre)	2
Centre Party (Senterpartiet)	2
Socialist Left Party (Sosialistisk Venstreparti)	2
Liberal Party (Venstre)	1
Total number of members:	29

Søndre Land kommunestyre 1983–1987
Party name (in Norwegian)	Number of representatives
Labour Party (Arbeiderpartiet)	21
Conservative Party (Høyre)	3
Centre Party (Senterpartiet)	2
Socialist Left Party (Sosialistisk Venstreparti)	2
Liberal Party (Venstre)	1
Total number of members:	29

Søndre Land kommunestyre 1979–1983
Party name (in Norwegian)	Number of representatives
Labour Party (Arbeiderpartiet)	20
Conservative Party (Høyre)	3
Christian Democratic Party (Kristelig Folkeparti)	1
Centre Party (Senterpartiet)	2
Socialist Left Party (Sosialistisk Venstreparti)	2
Liberal Party (Venstre)	1
Total number of members:	29

Søndre Land kommunestyre 1975–1979
Party name (in Norwegian)	Number of representatives
Labour Party (Arbeiderpartiet)	20
Conservative Party (Høyre)	2
Christian Democratic Party (Kristelig Folkeparti)	1
Socialist Left Party (Sosialistisk Venstreparti)	2
Joint list of the Centre Party (Senterpartiet) and the Liberal Party (Venstre)	4
Total number of members:	29

Søndre Land kommunestyre 1971–1975
Party name (in Norwegian)	Number of representatives
Labour Party (Arbeiderpartiet)	19
Conservative Party (Høyre)	1
Christian Democratic Party (Kristelig Folkeparti)	1
Centre Party (Senterpartiet)	4
Liberal Party (Venstre)	1
Socialist common list (Venstresosialistiske felleslister)	3
Total number of members:	29

Søndre Land kommunestyre 1967–1971
Party name (in Norwegian)	Number of representatives
Labour Party (Arbeiderpartiet)	19
Communist Party (Kommunistiske Parti)	1
Centre Party (Senterpartiet)	4
Socialist People's Party (Sosialistisk Folkeparti)	2
Liberal Party (Venstre)	3
Total number of members:	29

Søndre Land kommunestyre 1963–1967
Party name (in Norwegian)	Number of representatives
Labour Party (Arbeiderpartiet)	19
Communist Party (Kommunistiske Parti)	2
Christian Democratic Party (Kristelig Folkeparti)	1
Centre Party (Senterpartiet)	4
Liberal Party (Venstre)	3
Total number of members:	29

Søndre Land herredsstyre 1959–1963
Party name (in Norwegian)	Number of representatives
Labour Party (Arbeiderpartiet)	13
Communist Party (Kommunistiske Parti)	2
Joint List(s) of Non-Socialist Parties (Borgerlige Felleslister)	4
Total number of members:	19

Søndre Land herredsstyre 1955–1959
Party name (in Norwegian)	Number of representatives
Labour Party (Arbeiderpartiet)	12
Communist Party (Kommunistiske Parti)	3
Joint List(s) of Non-Socialist Parties (Borgerlige Felleslister)	4
Total number of members:	19

Søndre Land herredsstyre 1951–1955
Party name (in Norwegian)	Number of representatives
Labour Party (Arbeiderpartiet)	11
Communist Party (Kommunistiske Parti)	2
Joint List(s) of Non-Socialist Parties (Borgerlige Felleslister)	3
Total number of members:	16

Søndre Land herredsstyre 1947–1951
Party name (in Norwegian)	Number of representatives
Labour Party (Arbeiderpartiet)	9
Communist Party (Kommunistiske Parti)	4
Joint list of the Liberal Party (Venstre) and the Radical People's Party (Radikale Folkepartiet)	1
Joint List(s) of Non-Socialist Parties (Borgerlige Felleslister)	2
Total number of members:	16

Søndre Land herredsstyre 1945–1947
Party name (in Norwegian)	Number of representatives
Labour Party (Arbeiderpartiet)	10
Communist Party (Kommunistiske Parti)	4
Joint list of the Liberal Party (Venstre) and the Radical People's Party (Radikale Folkepartiet)	1
Joint List(s) of Non-Socialist Parties (Borgerlige Felleslister)	1
Total number of members:	16

Søndre Land herredsstyre 1937–1940*
Party name (in Norwegian)	Number of representatives
Labour Party (Arbeiderpartiet)	13
Farmers' Party (Bondepartiet)	3
Total number of members:	16
Note: Due to the German occupation of Norway during World War II, no elections were held for new municipal councils until after the war ended in 1945.

=== Mayors ===
The mayor (Norwegian: ordfører) of Søndre Land Municipality is the political leader of the municipality and the chairperson of the municipal council. Here is a list of people who have held this position:

- 1847–1851 Peder Pavels Aabel
- 1852–1858 Ole Hannibal Lie
- 1859–1861 Edvard Vilberg
- 1862–1865 Ole Hannibal Lie
- 1866–1883 Otto Emanuel Lie
- 1884–1887 Ole H. Lien
- 1887–1907 Ola Hofslien
- 1908–1914 Ole Martin Lappen (AD)
- 1914–1919 Wilhelm Eid
- 1920–1922 Johannes Hofslien (RF)
- 1923–1928 Jakob Nordli (NKP)
- 1929–1933 Martin Smeby (Ap)
- 1934–1934 Magnus Svendsen (Ap)
- 1935–1935 Bjarne Borgan (Ap)
- 1935–1937 Magnus Svendsen (Ap)
- 1938–1940 Marthinius Smerud (Ap)
- 1946–1975: Bernt Skjølaas (Ap)
- 1976–1982: Kåre Inngjerdingen (Ap)
- 1982–1994: Bjørn Hansen (Ap)
- 1994–1999: Ellen H. Magnussen (Ap)
- 1999–2011: Reidar Eriksen (LL)
- 2011–2019: Terje Odden (Ap)
- 2019–present: Anne Hagenborg (Ap)

== Media gallery ==
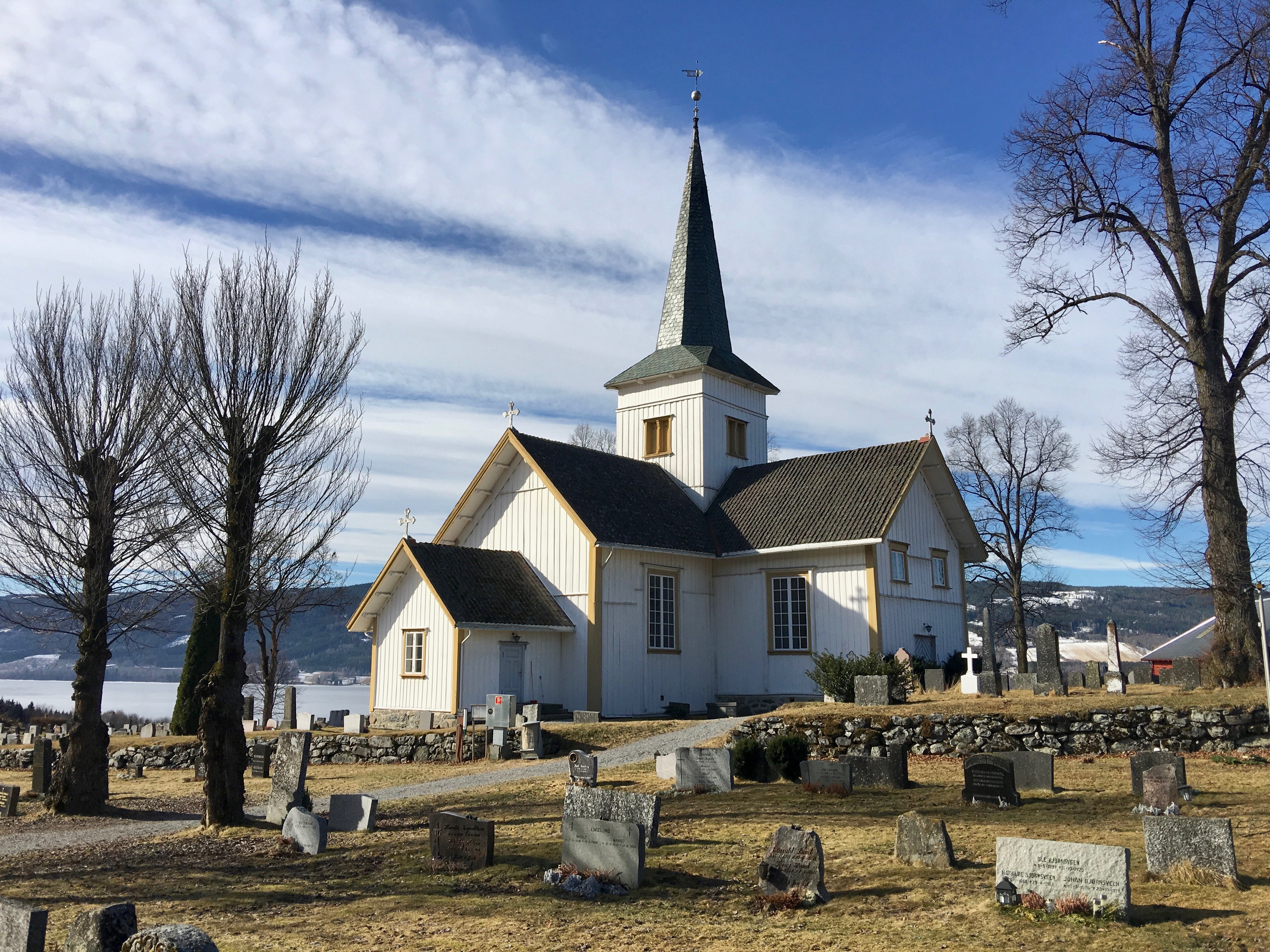
Hov Kirke Church (1781), Søndre Land Municipality

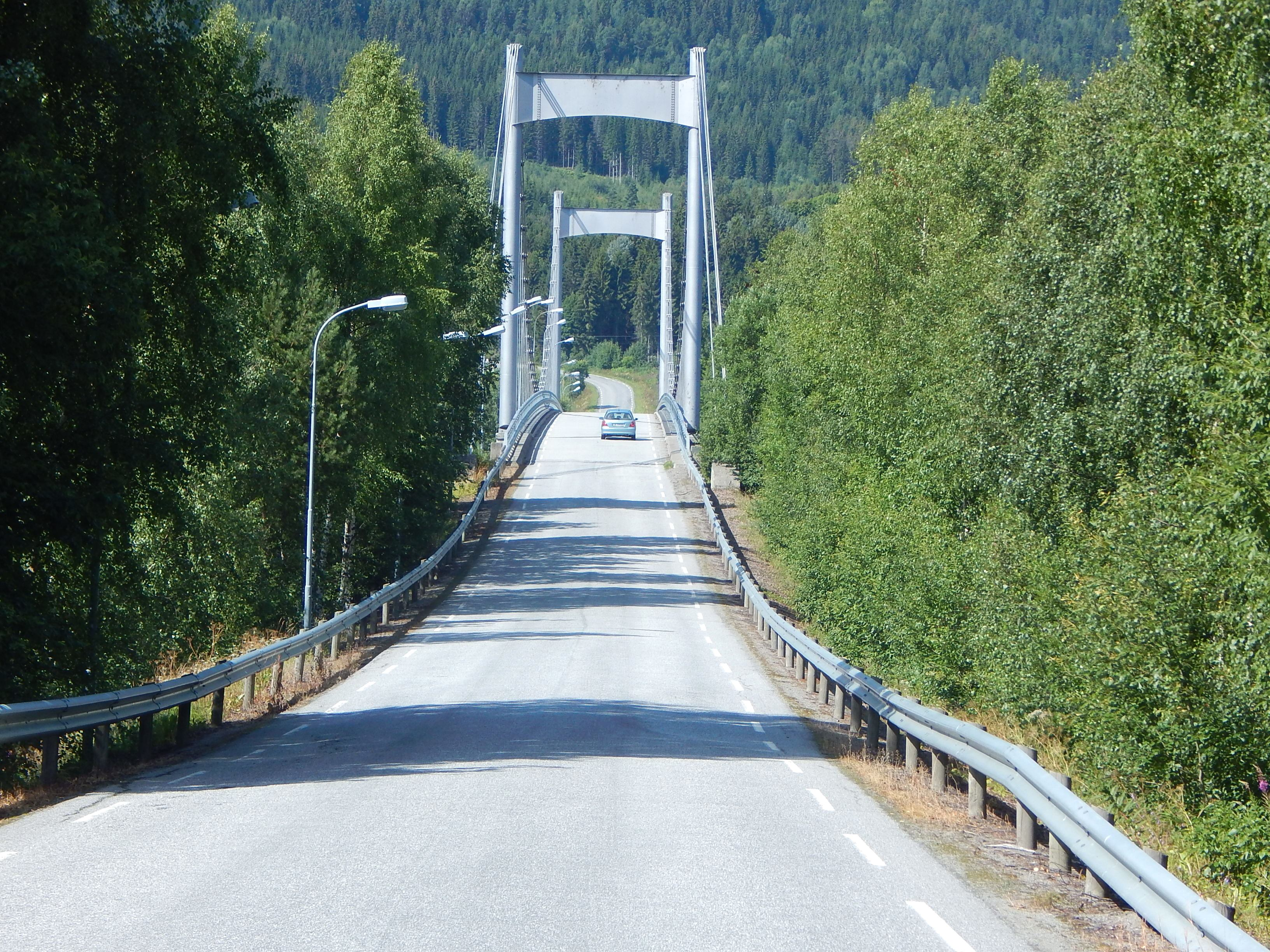
Fluberg bru

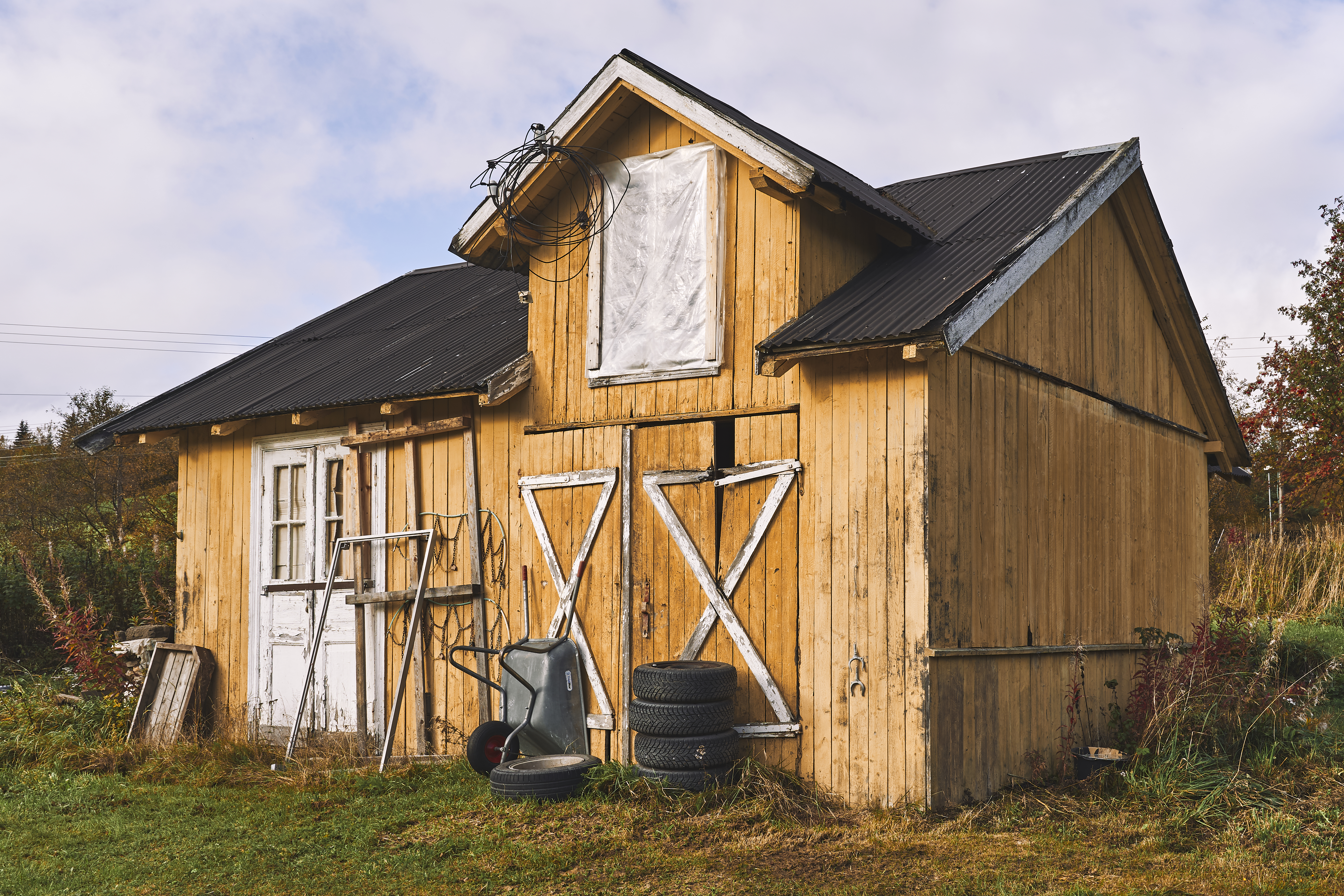
Landåsbygda og Landåsvannet en høstdag

== Notable people ==
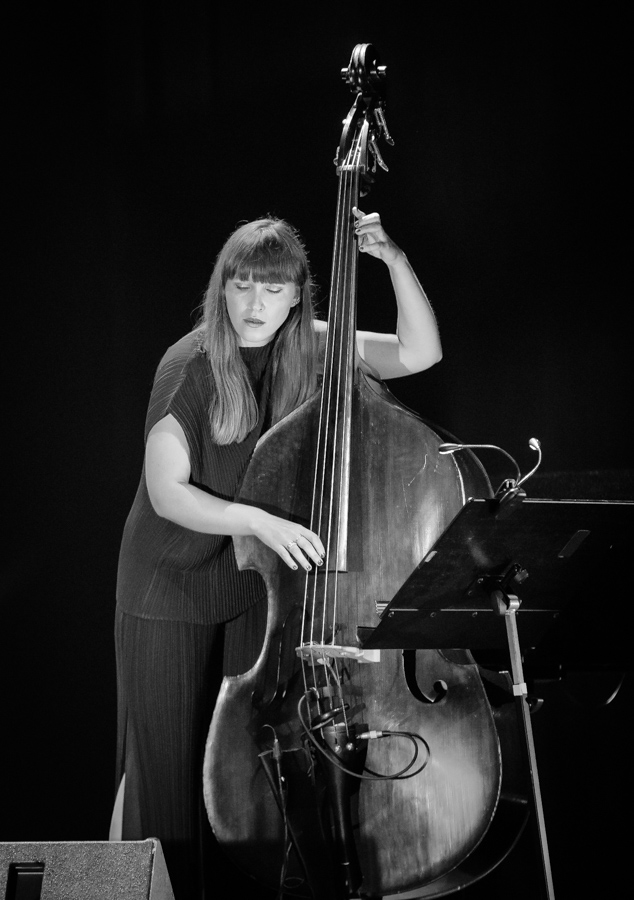
Ellen Andrea Wang, 2017

- Christian Ancher (1711-1765), a merchant, timber trader, and ship owner
- Peder Aadnes (1739–1792), a landscape painter of rural Norway
- Jørgen Meinich (1820-1911), a jurist and wood processor
- Martin Smeby (1891-1975), a Norwegian politician and mayor of Søndre Land in the 1930s
- Ola Viker (1897-1942), a novelist and lawyer
- Håvard Narum (born 1944), a journalist and author
- Ola Skjølaas (1941-2006), a veterinarian, civil servant, and politician
- Per Blom (1946-2013), a film director
- Finn Thrana (1958–2006), a Norwegian barrister and civil servant for Nasjonal Samling
- Ellen Andrea Wang (born 1986), a jazz double bass player, singer, and composer
