= Enger Church =

Church in Innlandet, Norway

- Enger kirke
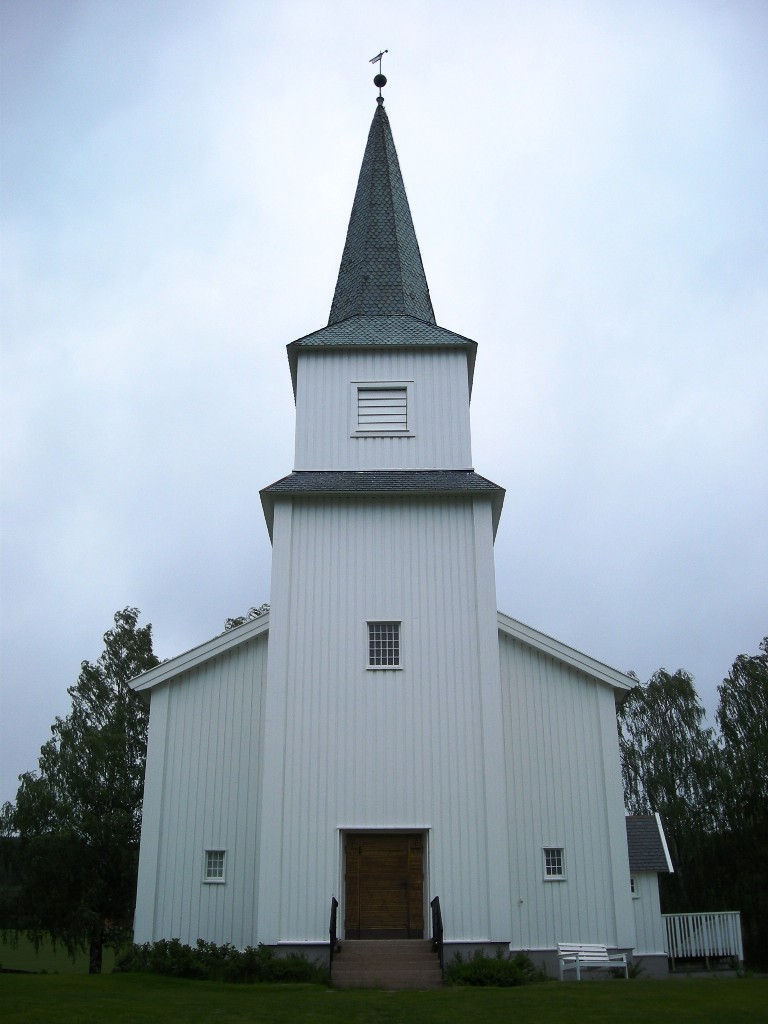
- View of the church
- Enger Church
- 60°34′49″N 10°20′00″E
- Location: Søndre Land, Innlandet
- Country: Norway
- Denomination: Church of Norway
- Churchmanship: Evangelical Lutheran

History
- Status: Parish church
- Founded: 1875
- Consecrated: 1875

Architecture
- Functional status: Active
- Architect: Herman Frang
- Architectural type: Long church
- Completed: 1875 (151 years ago)

Specifications
- Capacity: 200
- Materials: Wood

Administration
- Diocese: Hamar bispedømme
- Deanery: Hadeland og Land prosti
- Parish: Søndre Land
- Norwegian Cultural Heritage Site
- Type: Church
- Status: Not protected
- ID: 84097

Enger Church (Norwegian: Enger kirke) is a parish church of the Church of Norway in Søndre Land Municipality in Innlandet county, Norway. It is located in the village of Enger. It is one of the churches for the Søndre Land parish which is part of the Hadeland og Land prosti (deanery) in the Diocese of Hamar. The white, wooden church was built in a long church design in 1875 using plans drawn up by the architect Herman Frang. The church seats about 200 people.

== History ==
Planning for a new church in the southern part of Søndre Land Municipality began in the 1870s. Herman Frang was hired to design the new church. It was to be a wooden long church with a western tower. There was a choir on the eastern end of the nave and the choir was flanked by sacristies. The church was completed and consecrated in 1875. The church was restored in 1950.

== See also ==
- List of churches in Hamar
