= Skute Church =

Church in Innlandet, Norway

- Skute kirke
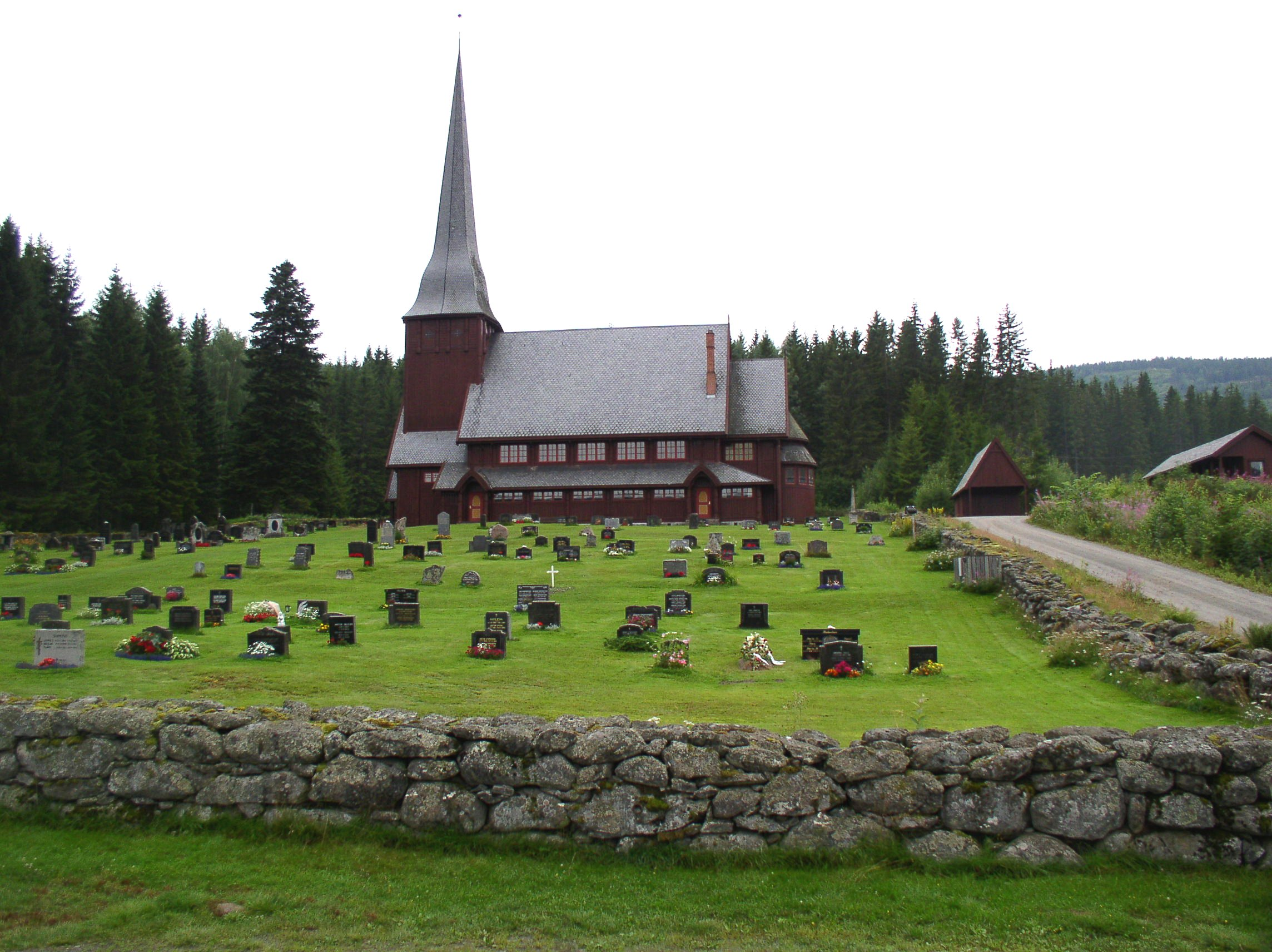
- View of the church
- Skute Church
- 60°38′17″N 10°20′05″E
- Location: Søndre Land, Innlandet
- Country: Norway
- Denomination: Church of Norway
- Churchmanship: Evangelical Lutheran

History
- Status: Parish church
- Founded: 1915
- Consecrated: 16 June 1915

Architecture
- Functional status: Active
- Architect: Ole Stein
- Architectural type: Long church
- Completed: 1915 (111 years ago)

Specifications
- Capacity: 360
- Materials: Wood

Administration
- Diocese: Hamar bispedømme
- Deanery: Hadeland og Land prosti
- Parish: Skute
- Norwegian Cultural Heritage Site
- Type: Church
- Status: Protected
- ID: 85485

Skute Church (Norwegian: Skute kirke) is a parish church of the Church of Norway in Søndre Land Municipality in Innlandet county, Norway. It is located in the village of Ringelia. It is the church for the Skute parish which is part of the Hadeland og Land prosti (deanery) in the Diocese of Hamar. The brown, wooden church was built in a long church design in 1915 using plans drawn up by the architect Ole Stein. The church seats about 360 people.

== History ==
In the early 20th century, planning began for a church in Søndre Land on the west side of the Randsfjorden. Ole Stein was hired to design the new church. Peder Skute donated the land on which the church was built. It was built as a long church in a style that mimics the designs of the medieval stave churches in Norway. The new building was consecrated by Bishop Christen Brun on 16 June 1915. The church received electric lighting in 1923 and electric heating in 1955.

== See also ==
- List of churches in Hamar
