= Øyvind Myhre =

Øyvind Kvernvold Myhre (born 2 January 1945) is a Norwegian author of science fiction and fantasy literature. He has written more than twenty novels and short stories. from 1975-1977 he was author and editor of the Norwegian science fiction magazine NOVA. He also published a fanzine called GANDALF.

Øyvind Myhre earned his siv.ing. degree from the Norwegian Institute of Technology. He has worked for IBM as a system consultant.

Born in Fluberg, Myhre is a member of the municipal council of Gran Municipality for the period of 2007-2011, representing a local list.

Frequent themes in his novels are meditations about freedom and how it is threatened by state power and excessive bureaucracy, reflecting Myhre's libertarian outlook. Myhre's fascination with H.P. Lovecraft and the Cthulhu Mythos is also apparent in several of his novels and short stories, ranging from more oblique references to the explicit Lovecraftian themes and references in Mørke over Dunwich (1991).

== Bibliography ==
- Aster (1974)
- Snøen på Nix Olympica (1975) ISBN 91-7648-045-3
- Kontrabande (1976)
- De siste tider: en fantasi om frihet (1976)ISBN 8202035465
- Demoner i dagslys: tretten fortellinger (1977)
- Sabotørene (1978) ISBN 82-02-04114-7
- Magiske verdener: fantasilitteraturen fra Gilgamesj til Richard Adams (1979) ISBN 82-02-04294-1
- Kongen og gudene (1979)
- En himmel av jern (1980) ISBN 82-02-04681-5
- Grønlandsfarerne (1981)
- 1989 (1982) ISBN 82-09-10108-0
- Makt(1983)
- Datakultur: (en forfatters farvel til skrivemaskinen) (1983)
- Følge en drøm (1984) ISBN 82-588-0307-7
- Pålgrims vandring (1985) ISBN 82-02-09301-5
- Møt meg i Moolawatana (1986) ISBN 82-02-11062-9
- Mørke over Dunwich (1991)
- Skyld – roman (1993)
- Stjerner over Tharsis (1995)
- Vindens datter, Bjørnens bror (1997)
- Elide av Sarande (2024)
- Hell og lykke i Agadan (2025)
