= Hov Church (Innlandet) =

Church in Innlandet, Norway

- Hov kirke
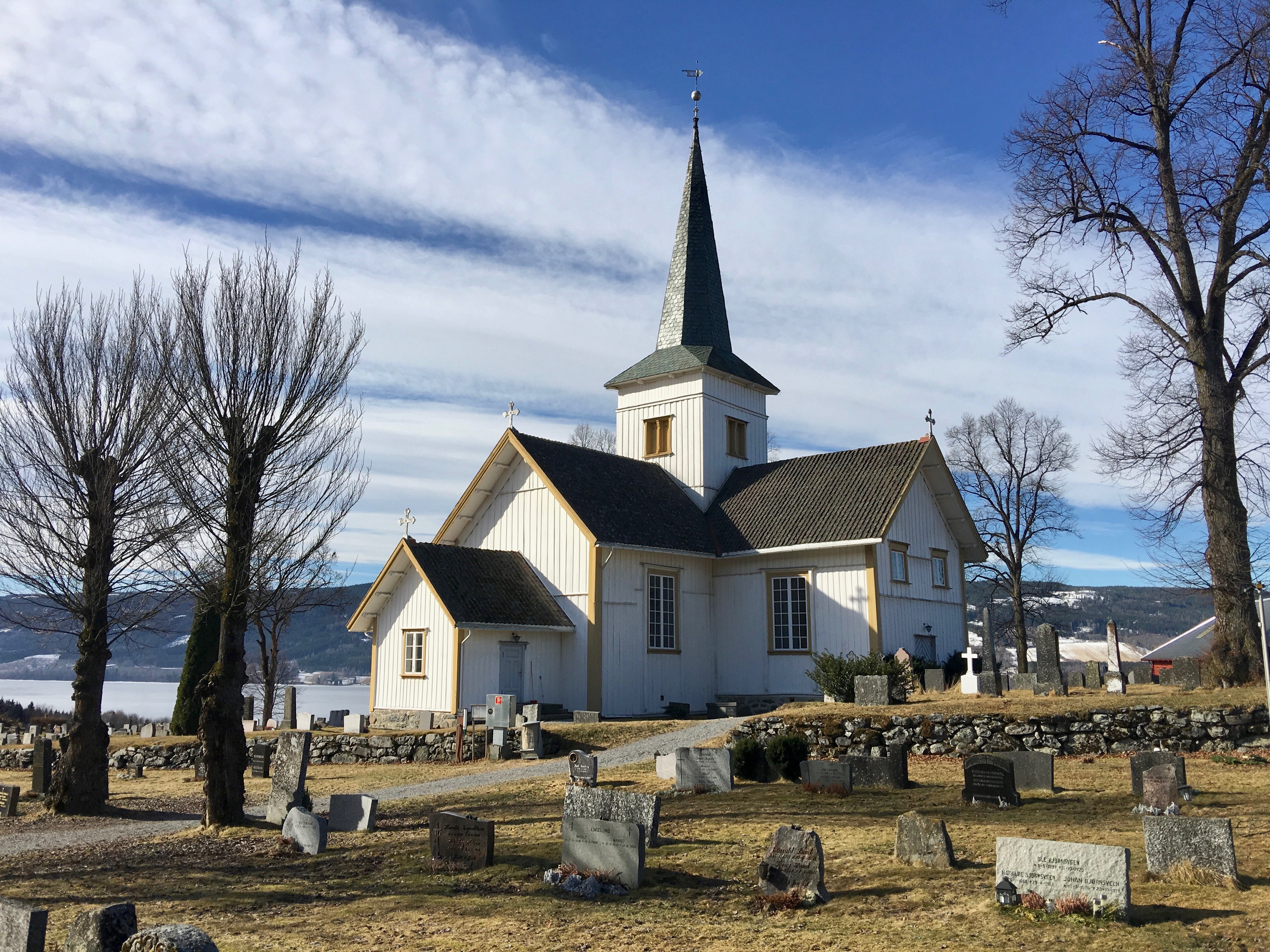
- View of the church
- Hov Church
- 60°41′51″N 10°21′03″E
- Location: Søndre Land, Innlandet
- Country: Norway
- Denomination: Church of Norway
- Previous denomination: Catholic Church
- Churchmanship: Evangelical Lutheran

History
- Status: Parish church
- Founded: 13th century
- Consecrated: 12 September 1781

Architecture
- Functional status: Active
- Architect: Svend Olsen Odnes
- Architectural type: Cruciform
- Completed: 1781 (245 years ago)

Specifications
- Capacity: 300
- Materials: Wood

Administration
- Diocese: Hamar bispedømme
- Deanery: Hadeland og Land prosti
- Parish: Søndre Land
- Norwegian Cultural Heritage Site
- Type: Church
- Status: Automatically protected
- ID: 84641

Hov Church (Norwegian: Hov kirke) is a parish church of the Church of Norway in Søndre Land Municipality in Innlandet county, Norway. It is located in the village of Hov. It is one of the churches for the Søndre Land parish which is part of the Hadeland og Land prosti (deanery) in the Diocese of Hamar. The white, wooden church was built in a cruciform design in 1781 using plans drawn up by the architect Svend Olsen Odnes. The church seats about 300 people.

== History ==
The first church in Hov was a wooden stave church that was likely built during the 13th century. Records show that the old medieval building was torn down in 1648. A new wooden church was built on the same site the following year in 1649. In 1778, the church likely burned down in a fire. After the site was cleared, Svend Olsen Odnes was hired to design the new wooden cruciform building. The new church was consecrated on 12 September 1781. During the late-1800s, the church was renovated. The interior was radically changed: the crucifix was removed, and most of the walls were painted over with white or gold. The pews were replaced, the sacristy was moved to the east, an entrance was made on the north side, and the church had taller windows installed. The tower was also changed during this renovation. The church received electric lighting in 1931.

== Media gallery ==
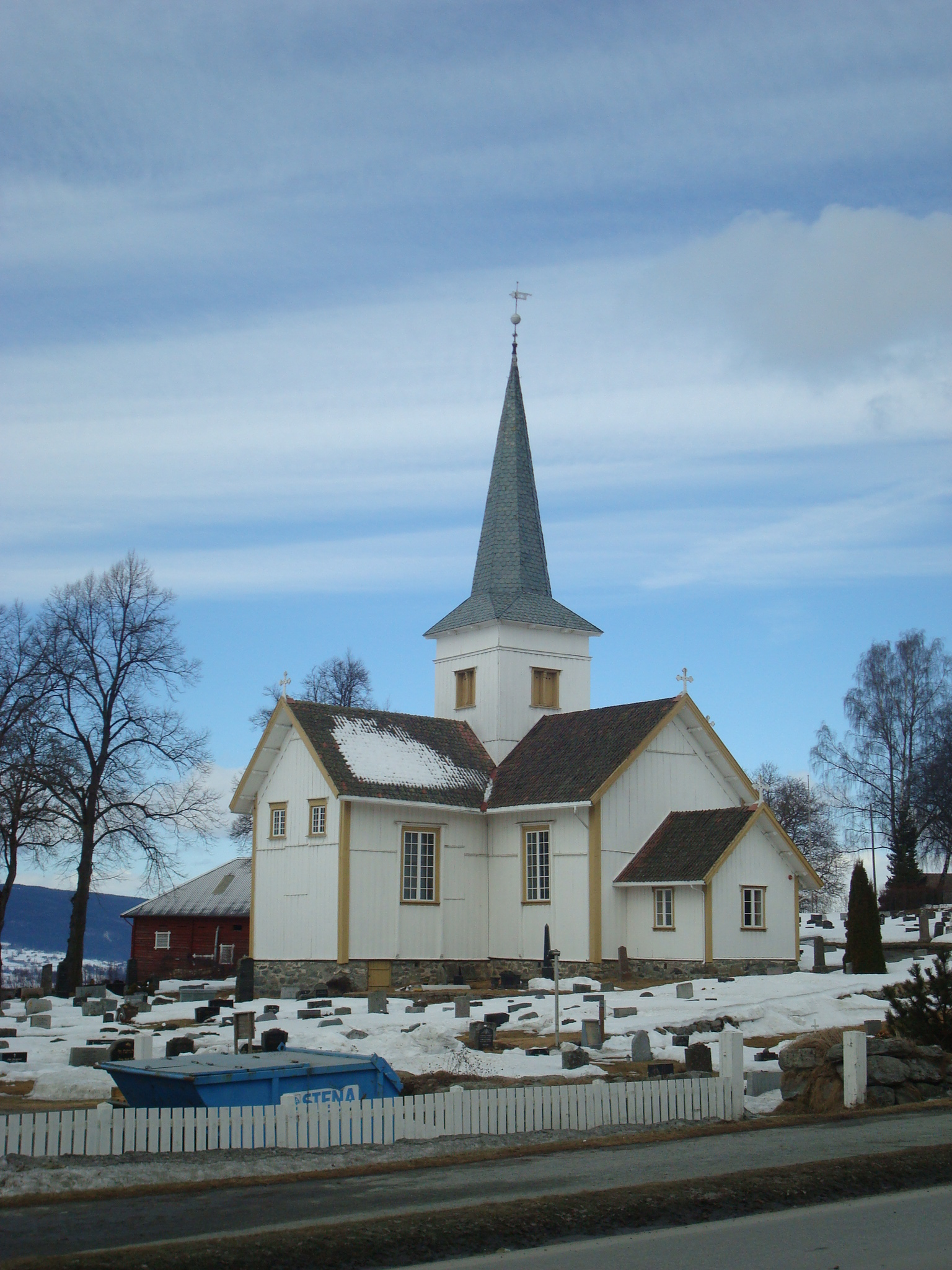

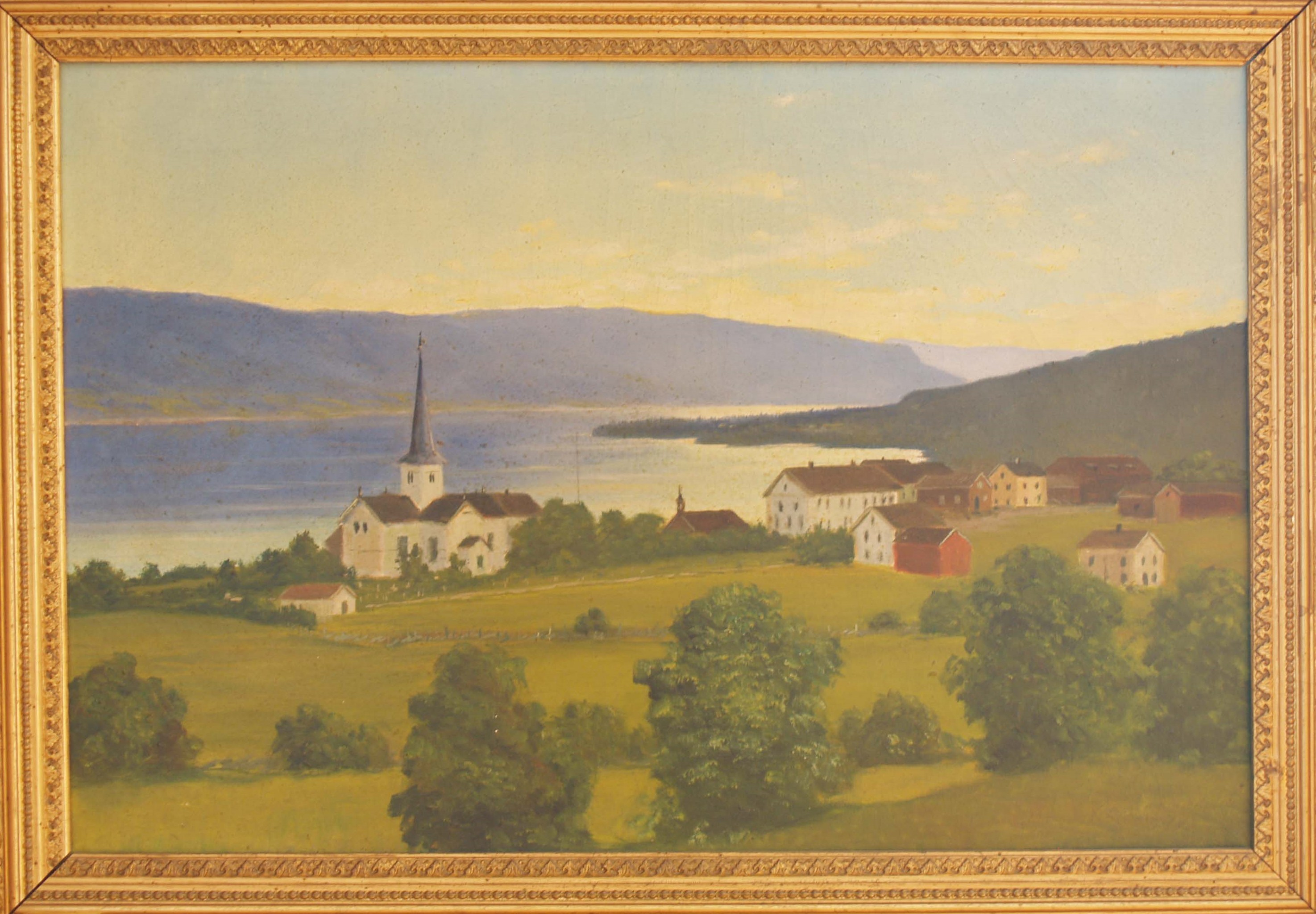
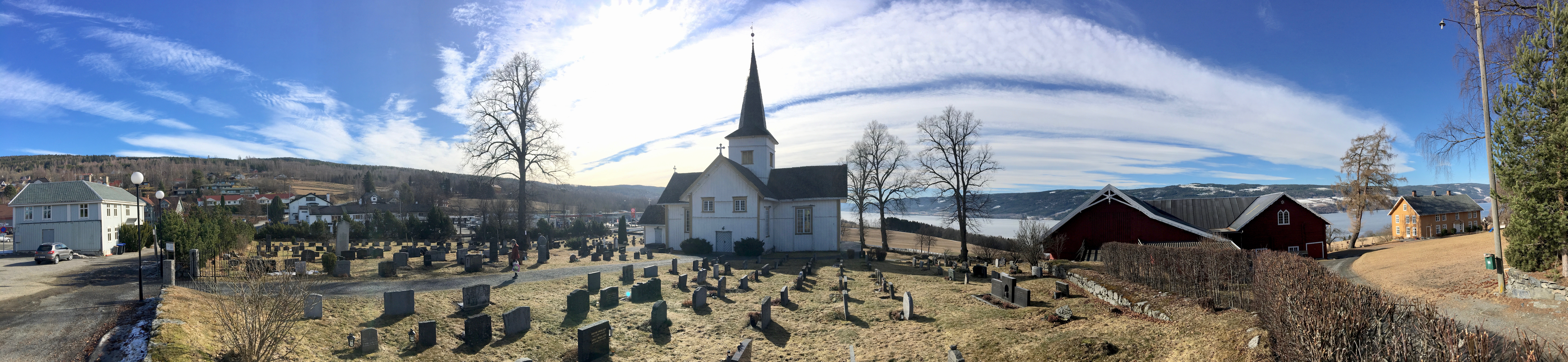
Panoramic view

== See also ==
- List of churches in Hamar
