= Land, Norway =

Traditional district in Norway

Land
- District
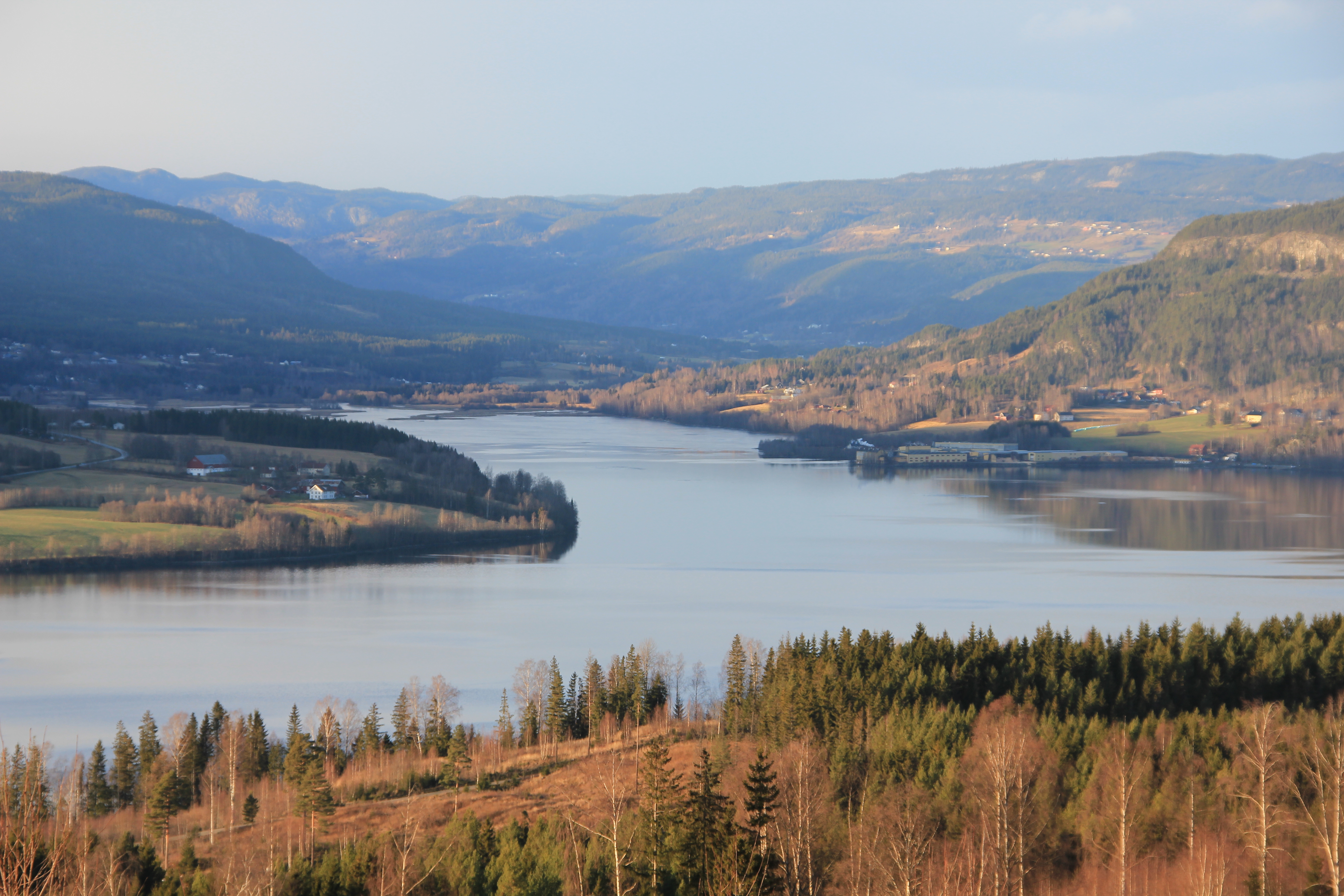
- The Dokka Delta, a nature reservoir close to Dokka.

- Coordinates: 60°14′N 9°52′E
- Country: Norway
- County: Innlandet
- Region: Austlandet
- Largest settlement: Dokka

Area
  - Total: 1,684 km^{2} (650 sq mi)

Population (2022)
  - Total: 12,160
  - Density: 7.221/km^{2} (18.70/sq mi)
- Demonym: Landing

Land is a traditional district in Innlandet county, Norway. The area consists of Nordre Land Municipality and Søndre Land Municipality. Land is centered on the northern part of Randsfjorden, to the southeast of the district of Valdres.

== History ==
In the early Viking Age, before Harald Fairhair was king, Land was a petty kingdom. For centuries, the area of Land was a parish within the Church of Norway. On 1 January 1838, the parish of Land was established as the new Land Municipality after the new formannskapsdistrikt law was passed, establishing municipal governments across Norway. That municipality was short-lived and in 1847, it was split into Nordre Land Municipality and Søndre Land Municipality. By the time of the partition, Land had a population of 9,199. Later, the Torpa Municipality and Fluberg Municipality were created by dividing Nordre Land and Søndre Land municipalities, but those new municipalities were short-lived.
