= Fluberg Church =

Church in Innlandet, Norway

- Fluberg kirke
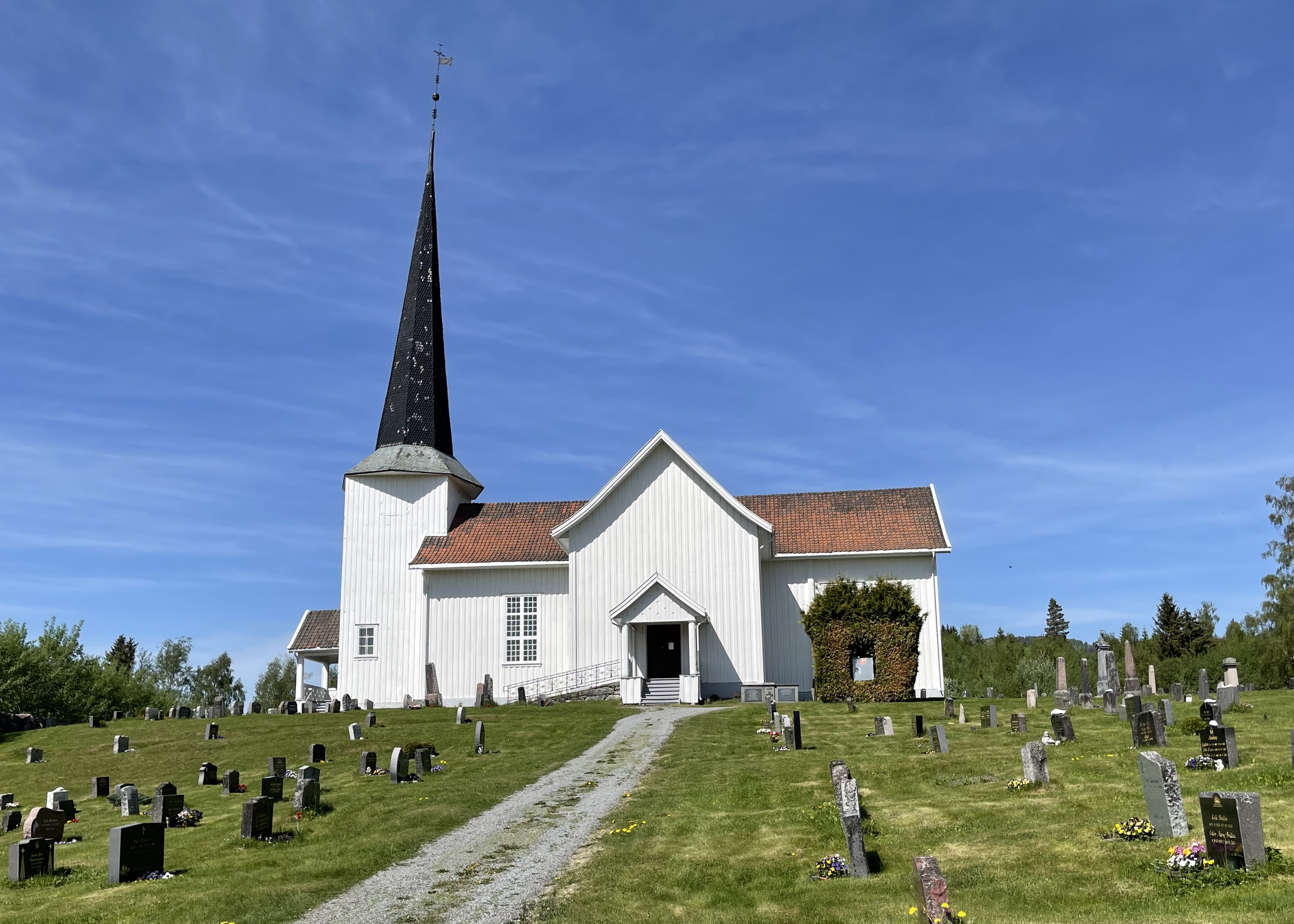
- View of the church
- Fluberg Church
- 60°46′34″N 10°14′46″E
- Location: Søndre Land, Innlandet
- Country: Norway
- Denomination: Church of Norway
- Previous denomination: Catholic Church
- Churchmanship: Evangelical Lutheran

History
- Status: Parish church
- Founded: 12th century
- Consecrated: 18 February 1703

Architecture
- Functional status: Active
- Architect: Oluf Mogensten
- Architectural type: Cruciform
- Completed: 1703 (323 years ago)

Specifications
- Capacity: 450
- Materials: Wood

Administration
- Diocese: Hamar bispedømme
- Deanery: Hadeland og Land prosti
- Parish: Fluberg
- Norwegian Cultural Heritage Site
- Type: Church
- Status: Automatically protected
- ID: 84166

Fluberg Church (Norwegian: Fluberg kirke) is a parish church of the Church of Norway in Søndre Land Municipality in Innlandet county, Norway. It is located in the village of Fluberg. It is one of the churches for the Fluberg parish which is part of the Hadeland og Land prosti (deanery) in the Diocese of Hamar. The white, wooden church was built in a cruciform design in 1703 using plans drawn up by the architect Oluf Mogensten. The church seats about 450 people.

== History ==
The earliest existing historical records of the church date back to the year 1330, but the church was not built that year. The first church in Fluberg was a wooden stave church that was likely built during the 12th century. This church stood about 300 metres (980 ft) to the southwest of the present church site, right along the shore of the Randsfjorden.

In 1690, the rectory which stood next to the church burned down. It was rebuilt soon afterwards. Around the same time, the old church was in very poor condition, so it was also decided to tear down the old church and to build a new church. The old site of the church, however, was too close to the lake which made the soil quite soggy and inappropriate for building a church upon. It was also a small plot of land with little room for expansion, so it was decided to move the new church to a better site about 300 metres (980 ft) to the northeast. A contract for the new church building was entered into on 17 October 1700. The new building was designed by Oluf Mogensten and the construction was led by Nils Olsen. The new church was a wooden cruciform building with the north, south, and west wings making up the nave and the east wing was the choir. There was also a small sacristy on the north side of the choir. Construction took place from 1700-1702 and the new church was consecrated on Shrove Sunday (18 February) 1703.

In 1814, this church served as an election church (Norwegian: valgkirke). Together with more than 300 other parish churches across Norway, it was a polling station for elections to the 1814 Norwegian Constituent Assembly which wrote the Constitution of Norway. This was Norway's first national elections. Each church parish was a constituency that elected people called "electors" who later met together in each county to elect the representatives for the assembly that was to meet at Eidsvoll Manor later that year.

In 1860, the church was renovated. In 1923, the interior was restored and redecorated. Historical restoration also took place in 2003.

== Media gallery ==
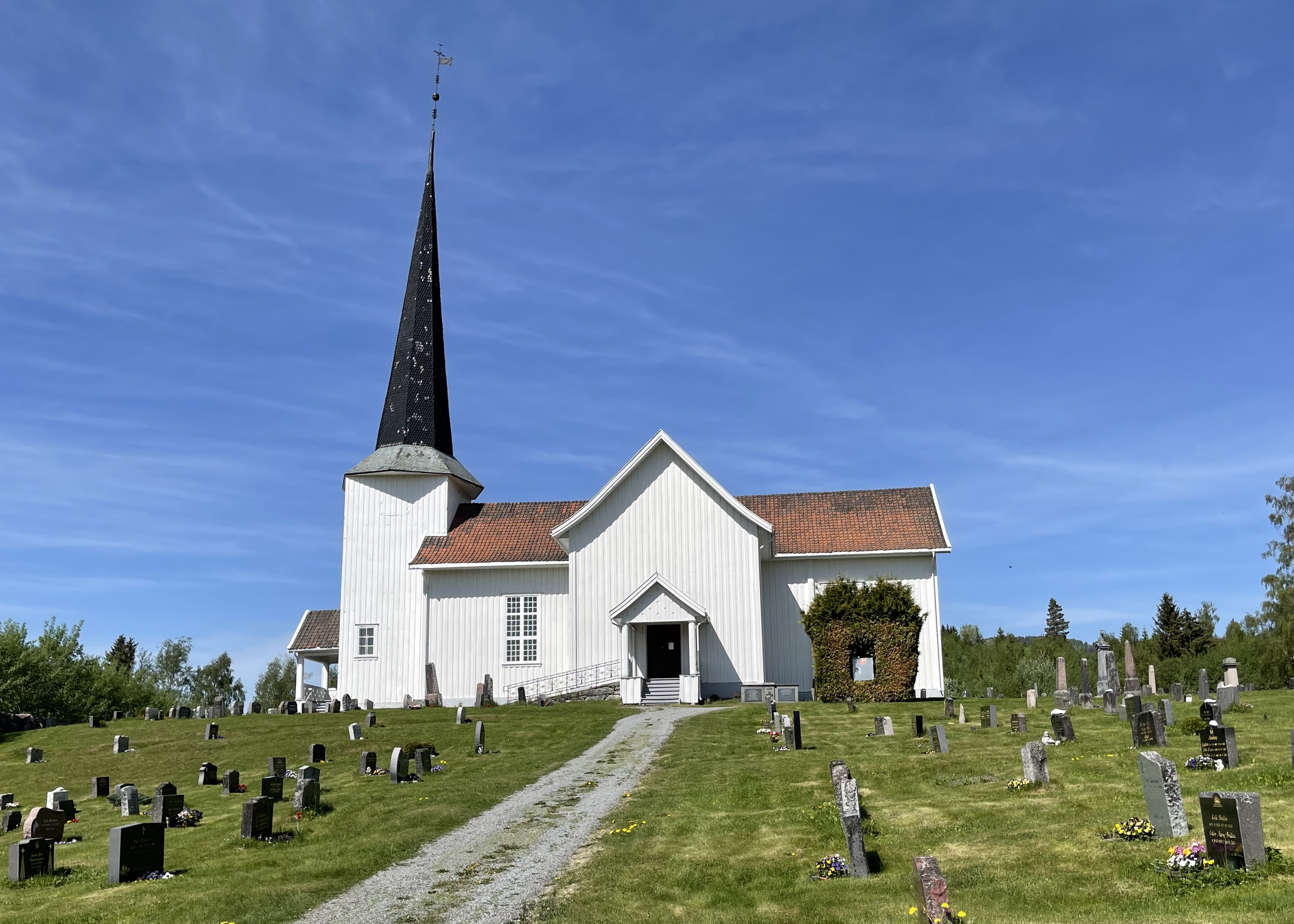

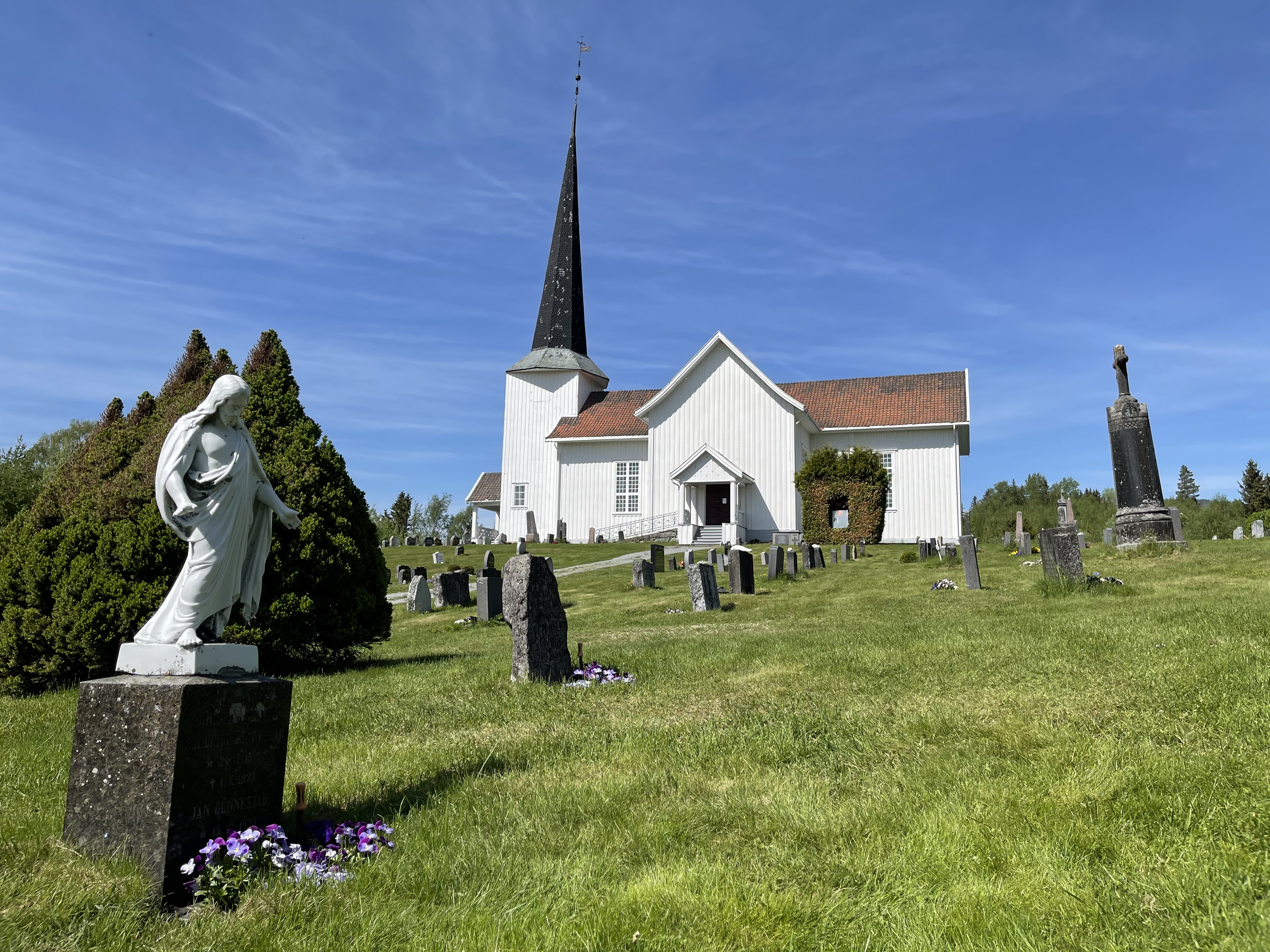

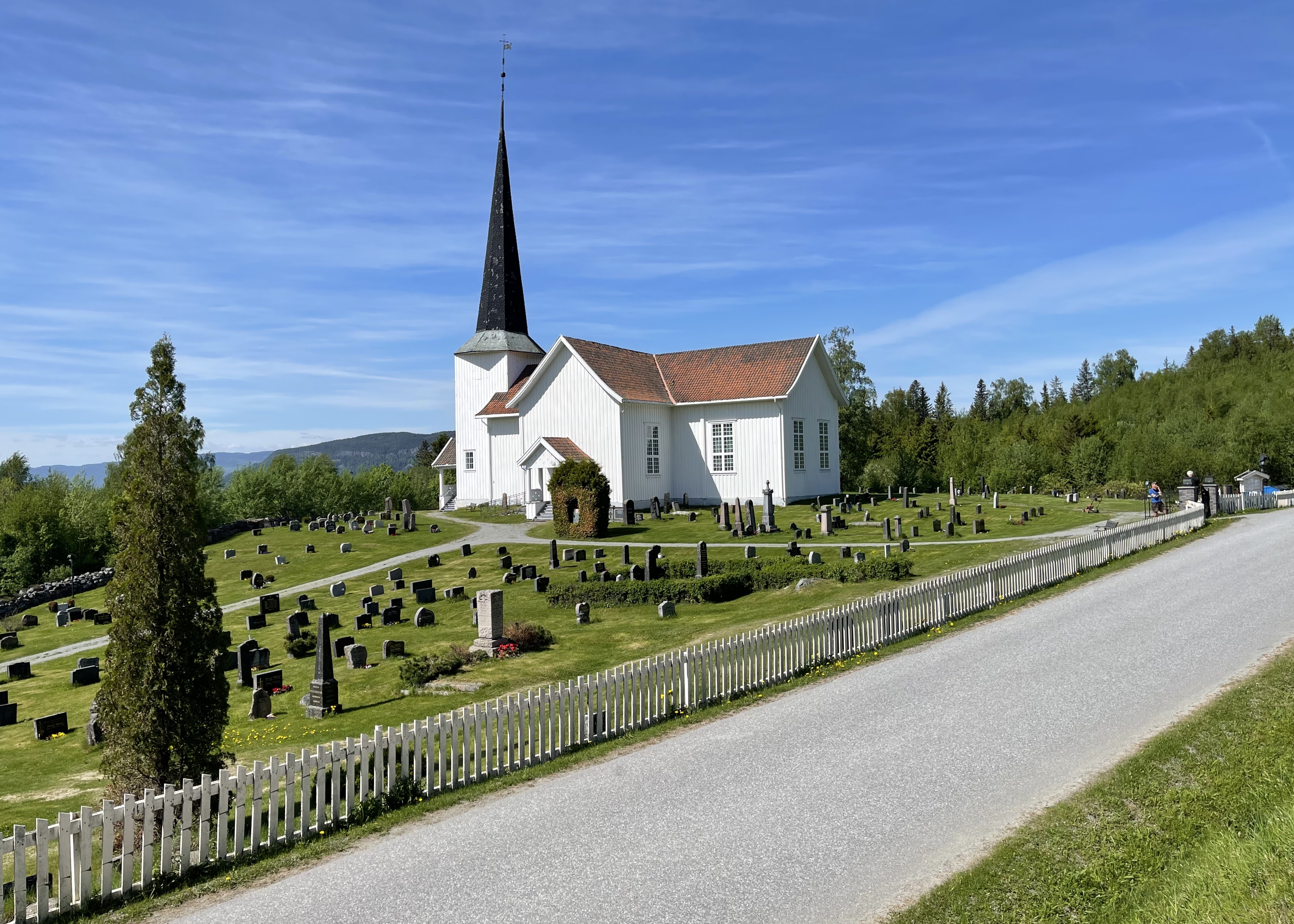

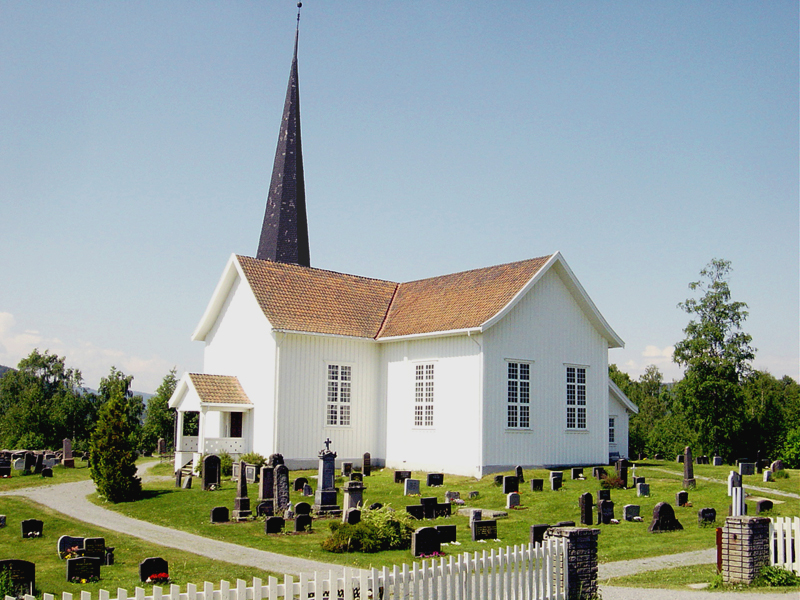

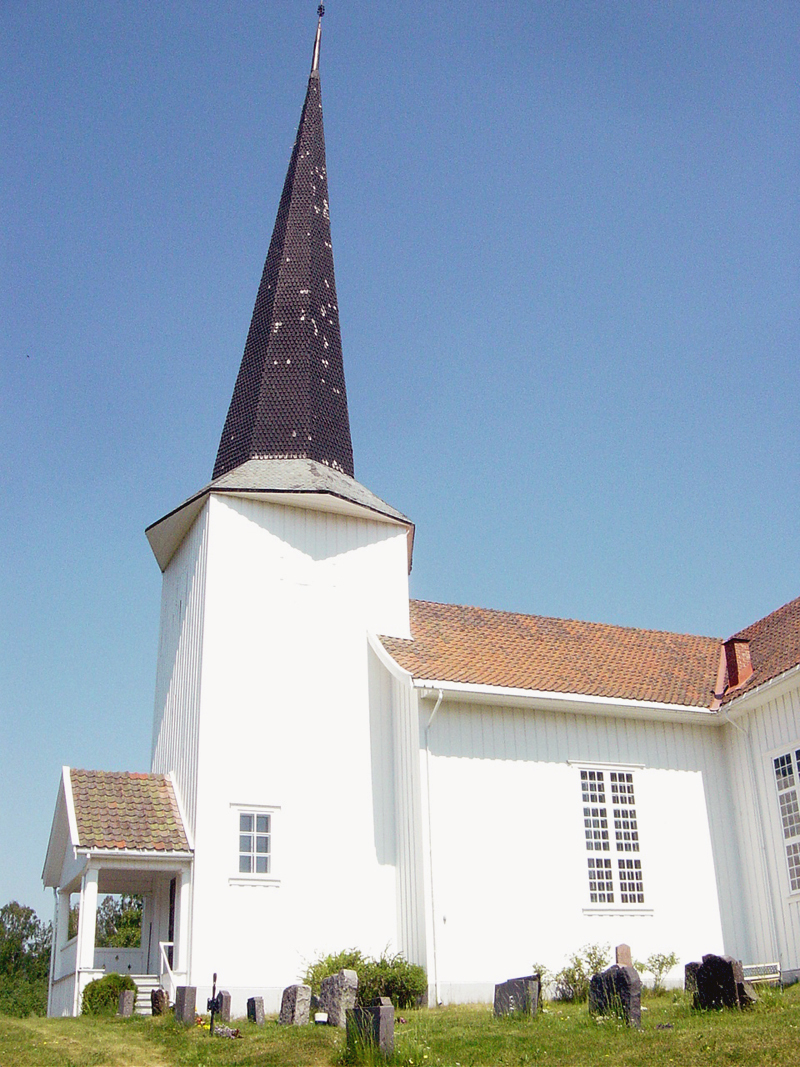

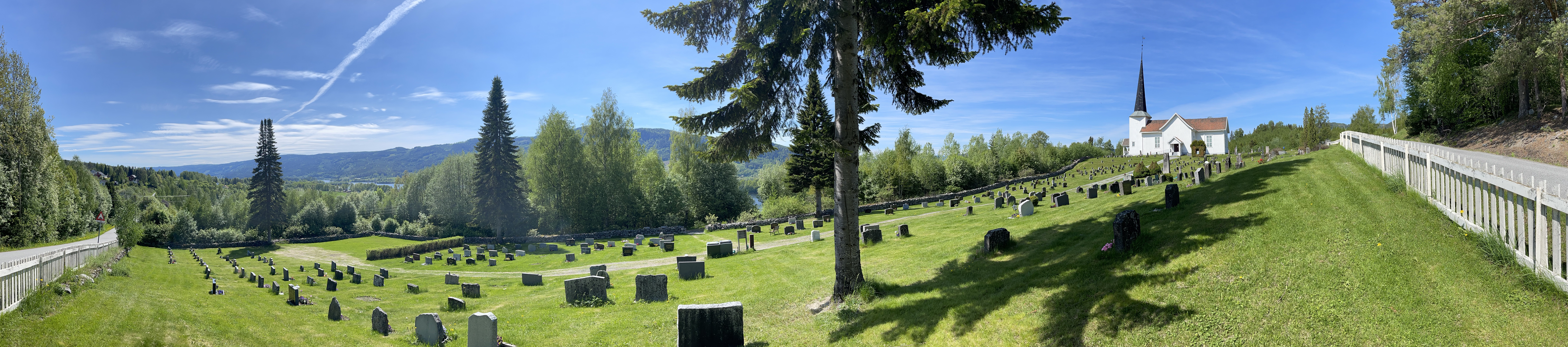

== See also ==
- List of churches in Hamar
