= Rock carvings at Færeldemyra =

Rock art site in Norway

- Helleristningene i Færeldemyra (Norwegian)
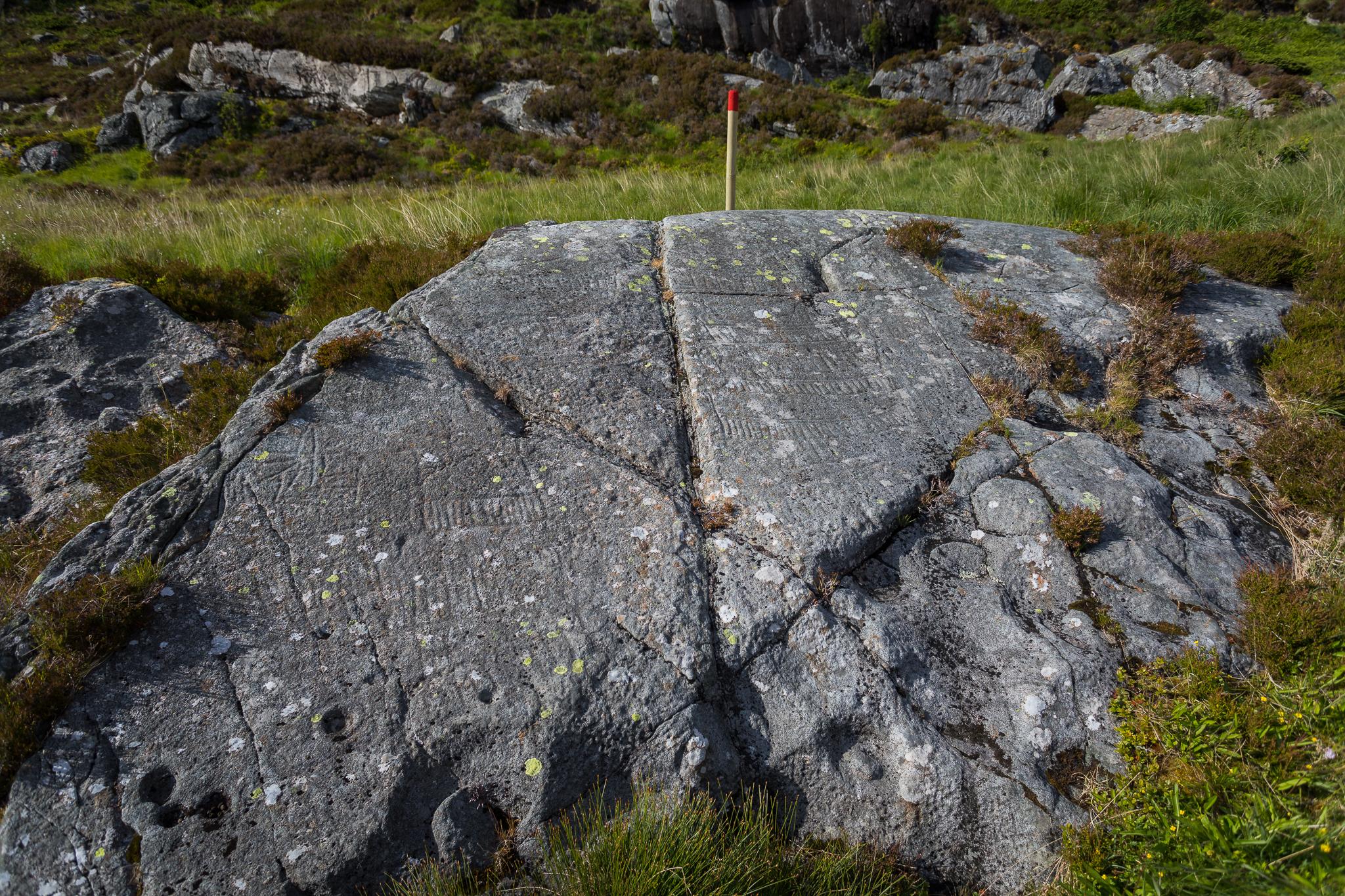
- Rock carvings at Færeldemyra on Husevågøy
- Interactive map of Rock carvings at Færeldemyra
- 61°54′36″N 5°01′07″E
- Type: Rock art site
- Location: Husevågøy, Kinn Municipality, Vestland, Norway

Designations
- Designation: Protected cultural heritage site

The rock carvings at Færeldemyra (Norwegian: Helleristningene i Færeldemyra) are a rock art site on Husevågøy in Kinn Municipality, Vestland, Norway.

The site is registered in Kulturminnesøk, the Norwegian cultural heritage database, as Krabbestig – Fetts fk.nr.1 og 2 Færeldemyra, Bergkunst. The registration gives the cultural heritage ID 35550.

The rock surface lies at Færeldemyra, near Krabbestig on Husevågøy. Store norske leksikon mentions Bronze Age rock carvings in serpentine on Husevågøy.

== Rock art and quarry ==
The site includes rock carvings on a small rock surface. The registered figures include ship figures, cup marks and other marks.

The same rock surface also has traces of soapstone quarrying. A registration from 2003 recorded several extraction marks around the carvings.

== Dating ==
The rock carvings at Færeldemyra are generally linked with the Bronze Age. Store norske leksikon mentions Bronze Age rock carvings in serpentine on Husevågøy.

The 2003 registration also notes that one boat figure may be later than the others, possibly from the Late Bronze Age or the Pre-Roman Iron Age.

The soapstone quarrying is a later use of the same rock surface.

== Protection and access ==
The site is registered in Kulturminnesøk as a protected cultural heritage site. The registration lists both rock carvings and a soapstone quarry at the locality.

The site can be reached from Husevåg by a marked hiking route towards Færeldemyra and Trollehola. UT.no describes the walk as a 5.3 kilometre return trip.

== See also ==
- Husevågøy
- List of rock carvings in Norway
- Petroglyph
