= Husevåg =

Village in Kinn Municipality, Norway

- Village
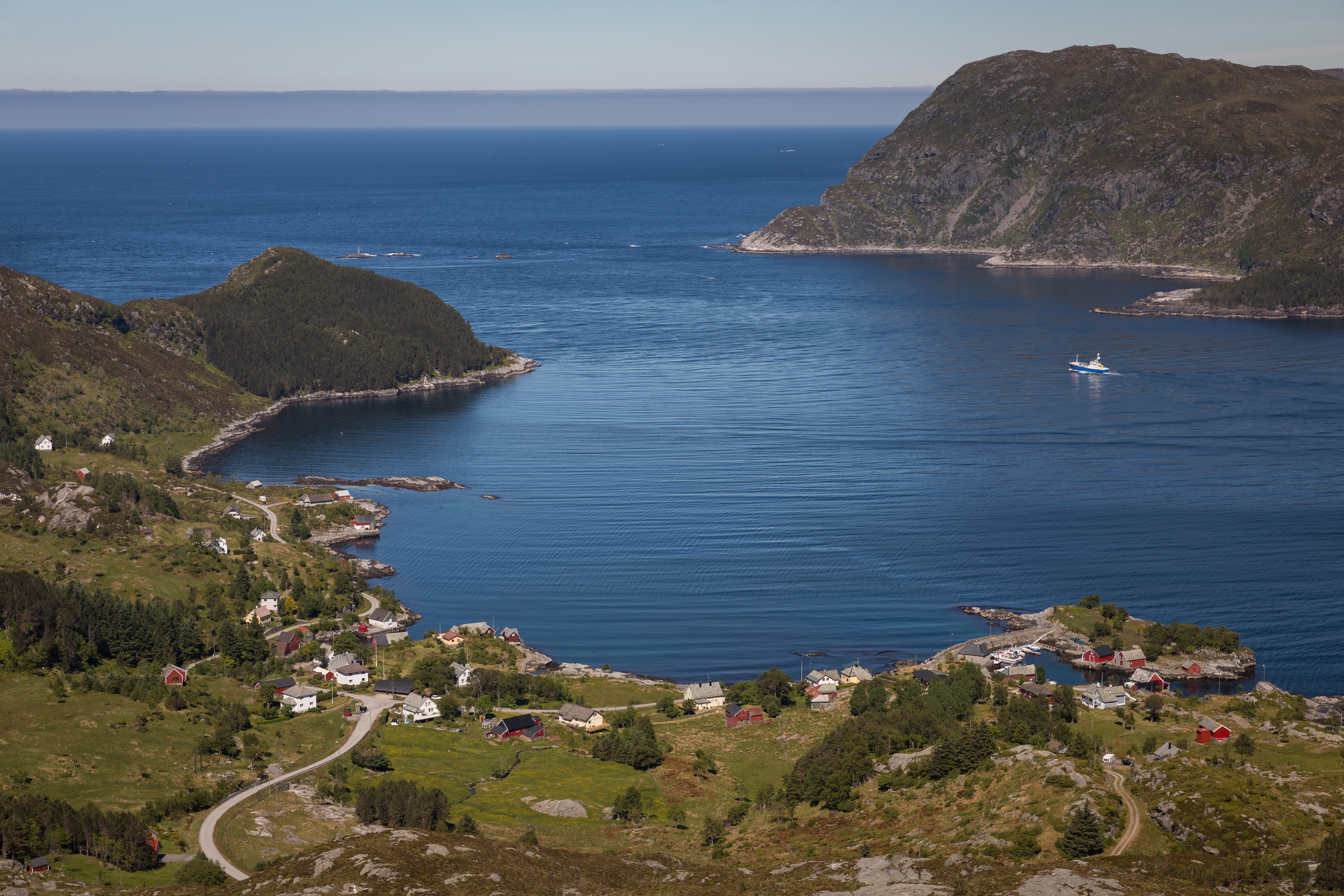
- View of Husevåg
- Interactive map of Husevåg
- Location within Vestland Location within Norway
- Coordinates: 61°55′10″N 5°01′47″E
- Country: Norway
- Region: Western Norway
- County: Vestland
- Municipality: Kinn Municipality

Population (2018)
  - Total: 30
- Time zone: UTC+01:00 (CET)
  - Summer (DST): UTC+02:00 (CEST)
- Postal code: 6716 Husevåg

Husevåg is a small coastal village on the north-western side of the island of Husevågøy in Kinn Municipality, Vestland county, Norway. It is located in the outer part of Nordfjord, between Bremangerlandet and Vågsøy. Store norske leksikon gives the population of Husevåg as 30 in 2018.

The settlement has historically been connected with fishing, small-scale farming and maritime traffic. Husevåg is listed in a 2011 mapping of Norwegian state fishery harbours as a state fishery harbour facility. The surrounding area includes documented cultural heritage sites, marked walking routes and a notable marine coral occurrence around Husevågøy.

== Geography ==
Husevåg lies on Husevågøy, a rocky island with little forest at the mouth of Nordfjord. The island lies between Bremangerlandet and Vågsøy, and has ferry connections with Måløy and Oldeide.

The village is situated around a small bay on the northern side of the island. The surrounding landscape consists of coastal hills, pasture land and shoreline areas facing Nordfjord and the outer coast.

== Nature and environment ==
Husevågøy lies in the outer part of Nordfjord, at the transition between the fjord landscape and the open coastal waters. Store norske leksikon describes Husevågøy as rocky and with little forest.

The waters around Husevågøy form part of the marine coastal landscape at the mouth of Nordfjord. In 2019, the County Governor of Vestland withdrew a discharge permit for an aquaculture site at Husevågøy because of the risk of irreversible damage to an approximately 1.5 km (0.93 mi) long occurrence of cauliflower coral. The Norwegian Institute of Marine Research assessed the cauliflower coral forest at Husevågøy as unique in Norway, based on its geographical extent and high density of individuals. According to the County Governor, the occurrence extended from about 25 to 100 m (82 to 328 ft) depth, with the densest occurrence shallower than 40 m (130 ft).

West of Husevågøy lies Klovningen Nature Reserve, which was protected in 1993 as part of a seabird conservation plan. The purpose of the protection is to safeguard an important breeding, migration and wintering area for seabirds, together with associated vegetation and wildlife. Landing and access on land areas, and within a zone extending about 50 m (160 ft) from land, are prohibited from 1 April to 31 July.

== Name ==
The name Husevåg is an old farm name. In Norske Gaardnavne, Oluf Rygh listed earlier written forms including Huseuogh in 1563, Hußeuog in 1603, Husseuog in 1608 and 1667, and Hussevog in 1723. Rygh explained the name as Old Norse Húsavágr, where the first element refers to the place as inhabited, in contrast to nearby bays without houses.

== History ==
Husevåg formed part of the wider coastal fishing and trading environment around Vågsfjorden. In Kringom's article on the trading post at Vågsberget, Husevåg is listed among the farms connected with Modesta Fester's takeover of the Vågsberget trading site in 1740.

The 1801 census recorded 11 people living at Husevåg, then written as Huusevog, in Davik parish. In the 1900 census, the settlement was listed as Husevaag, with 67 resident inhabitants.

Fishing has been an important part of the local economy. A notice in Tromsøposten in December 1896 described herring fishing in Vågsfjorden and Sildegapet, and mentioned a large herring catch at Husevågen in Davik municipality.

During the German occupation of Norway in the Second World War, there was German military activity on Husevågøy. Observation posts were established on the island, first at Kletten/Rønelden and later at Hovdeneset lighthouse. The observation post at Hovdeneset observed the Allied ships during the Måløy Raid in December 1941. For four young men from Husevåg, the raid marked the beginning of their escape from Norway to the United Kingdom.

== Harbour and transport ==
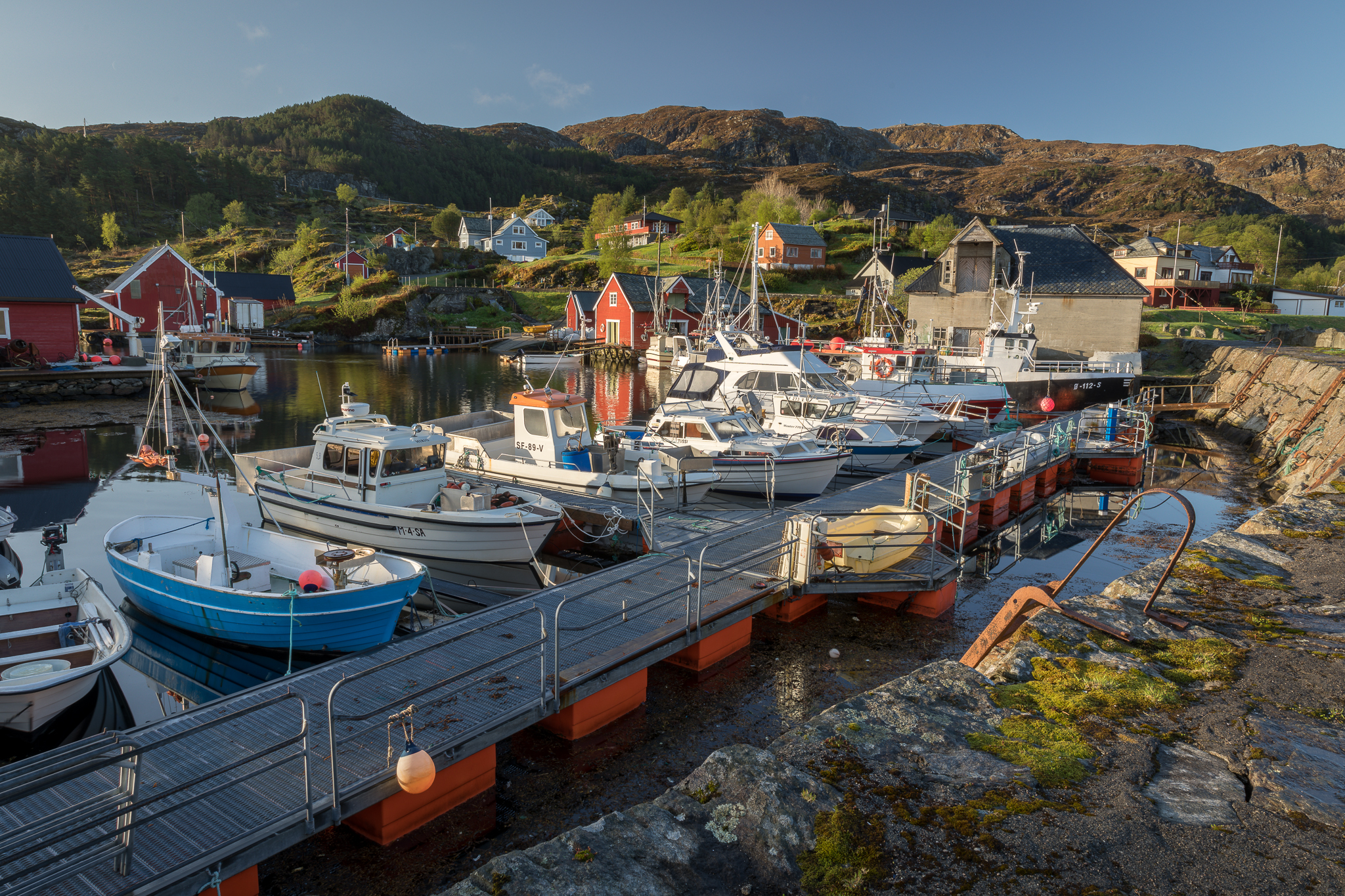
The fishery harbour at Husevåg on Husevågøy.

The bay at Husevåg has long been a local harbour environment associated with fishing and maritime transport. In 1917, Gula Tidend described Husevåg as a hamlet close to the fishing grounds, but with a need for a better harbour, and reported that the Norwegian state was to begin construction of a breakwater at Husevåg that spring.

Husevåg is listed as a state fishery harbour facility in the 2011 mapping of Norwegian state fishery harbours by the Norwegian Coastal Administration and the Directorate of Fisheries. The harbour is also described in a 1978 preliminary project report on smaller fishery harbours in Sogn og Fjordane.

Husevåg has a road connection to the ferry quay on Husevågøy. The ferry route between Måløy, Husevågøy and Oldeide connects the island with Vågsøy and Bremangerlandet. Fjord1's timetable for the Oldeide–Måløy route lists Husevågøy as a stop on some departures.

== Community ==
Husevåg became a separate school district in 1892. In the first years, teaching was organised locally in private homes, before Husevåg got its own schoolhouse. The schoolhouse was built in 1914 and taken into use in 1915. The school remained in operation until 2002, when the pupils were transferred to Skram school in Måløy.

Husevåg had a postal agency from 1935. The former postal place had the postcode 6716 HUSEVÅG and remained in operation until November 1997.

During the Second World War, the schoolhouse in Husevåg was requisitioned by the occupying forces, and teaching had to be held in private homes for a period.

== Cultural heritage ==
The area around Husevåg has several cultural heritage sites connected with the older use of Husevågøy. Store norske leksikon notes that Bronze Age rock carvings in serpentine are found on Husevågøy.

Trollholet, also known locally as Trollehola or Trollhola, is a cave on north-western Husevågøy. The site is registered in Kulturminnesøk as an automatically protected settlement and activity site with Cultural Heritage ID 6086. A test excavation in 1924 identified a cultural layer in the cave, and Kulturminnesøk dates the site to the pre-Reformation period.

The rock carvings at Færeldemyra, near Krabbestig on Husevågøy, are registered in Kulturminnesøk as an automatically protected rock art site and soapstone quarry with Cultural Heritage ID 35550. The site includes ship figures, cup marks and other figures in serpentine rock, and the same rock surface also has traces of soapstone vessel extraction.

== Outdoor recreation ==
Husevåg is a starting point for marked walks on Husevågøy. UT.no describes a route from the road near the old schoolhouse in Husevåg, via Færeldemyra and the rock carvings there, and further to Trollholet cave.

Other marked routes from the area around Husevåg lead towards Blåfjellet, 232 m (761 ft), Rauddalsegga, 318 m (1,043 ft), and Kletten/Rønelden, 321 m (1,053 ft).
