= Rock carvings at Drotten =

Petroglyphs in Norway

Coordinates: 61°10′56″N 10°24′39″E

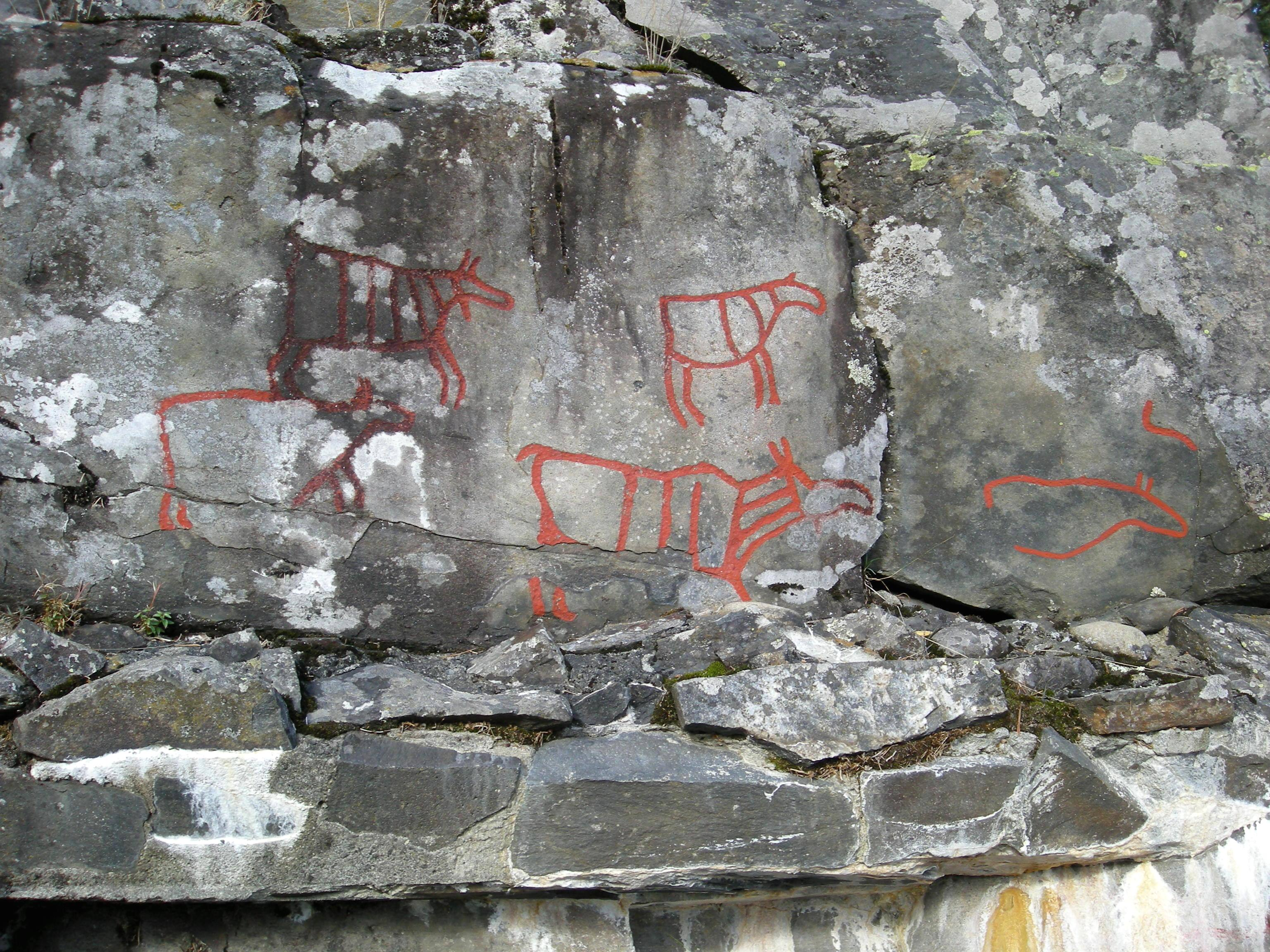
Rock petroglyphs at Drotten

The Rock carvings at Drotten are petroglyphs found near Fåberg, in Lillehammer municipality in the county of Innlandet, Norway.

== Location ==
The petroglyphs are located west of the river Lågen about 1.5 kilometres (0.9 mi) above the Brunlaug bridge. They are difficult to reach when the river is flooded.

== Description ==
There are a total of 11 petroglyphs within a 4 square metres (43 sq ft) area on a cliff by the river. Seven of them could represent moose. The rest are more ambiguous, but are also likely to be moose. The carvings are narrow and shallow, with the largest being 45 centimetres (18 in) across.

== See also ==
- Pre-historic art
- Petroglyph
- History of Norway
- List of World Heritage Sites in Europe
- Rock carvings in Norway
