= Rock carvings at Møllerstufossen =

Petroglyphs in Norway

Coordinates: 60°50′13″N 9°50′21″E

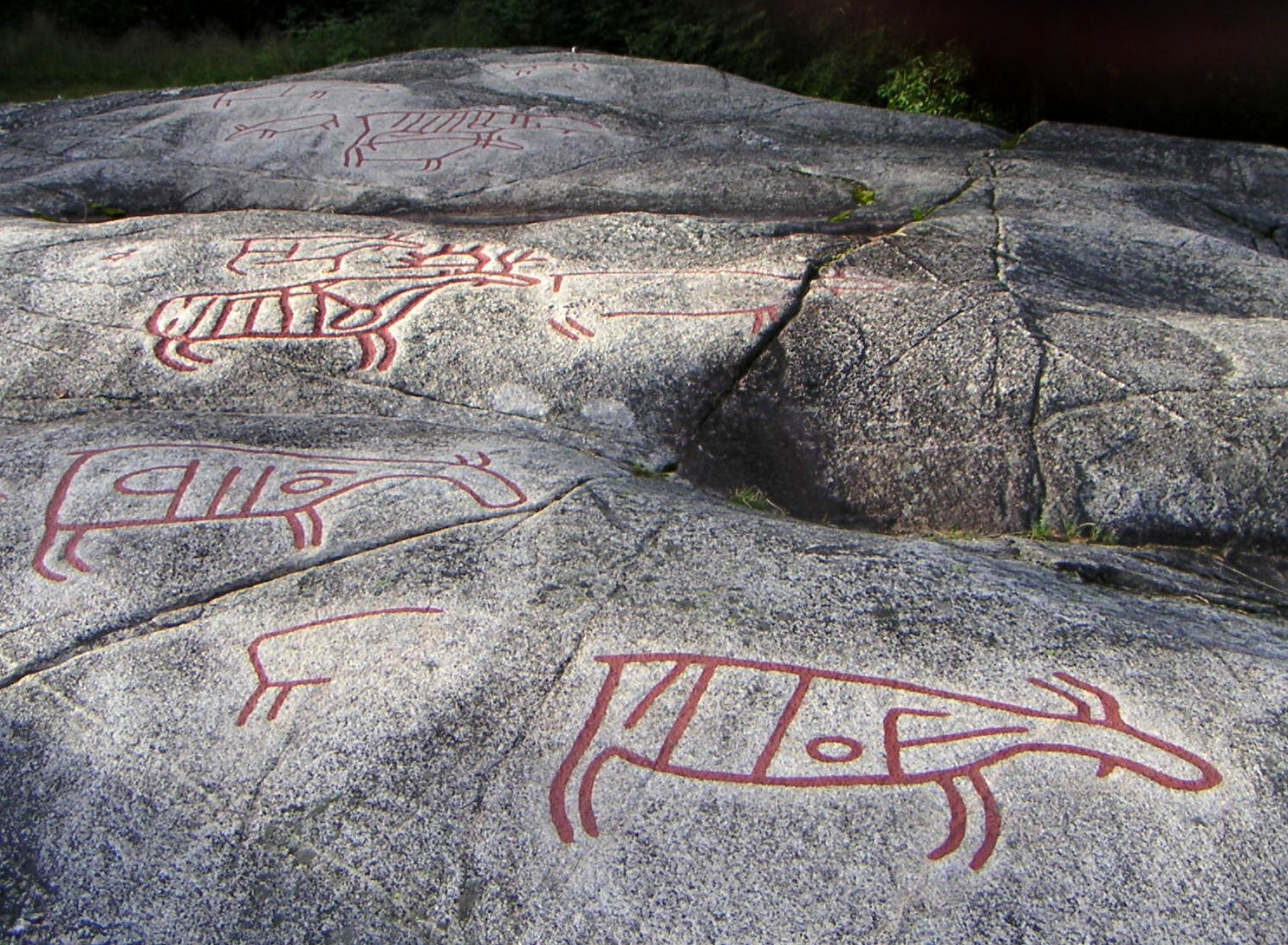
Rock carvings at Møllerstufossen, more than 6000 years old

The Rock carvings at Møllerstufossen are petroglyphs found in Nordsinni in Nordre Land Municipality in Innlandet county, Norway.

== Description ==
The carvings comprise several representations of moose and one other animal. The site covers about 20 square metres (220 sq ft). The largest figure measures about 90 centimetres (35 in) across. The figures are easy to spot: they were carved with deep and wide strokes and have been repainted.

== Access ==
The site is signposted. A small wooden boardwalk near the site provides access and helps limit wear on the carvings. The river Etna runs approximately 10 metres (35 ft) away, and in spring nearly floods the site.

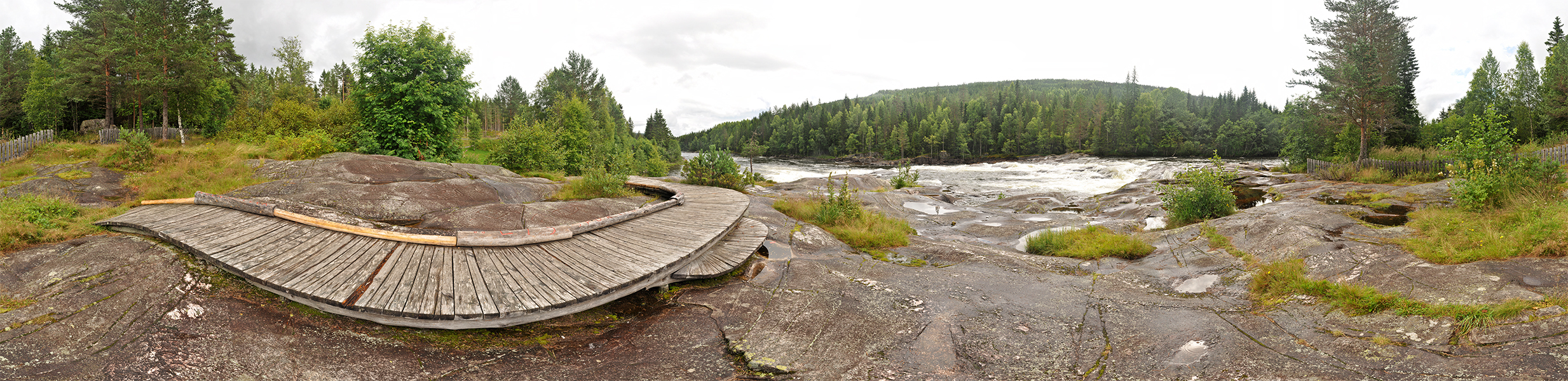
The area surrounding the rock carvings

== Gallery ==
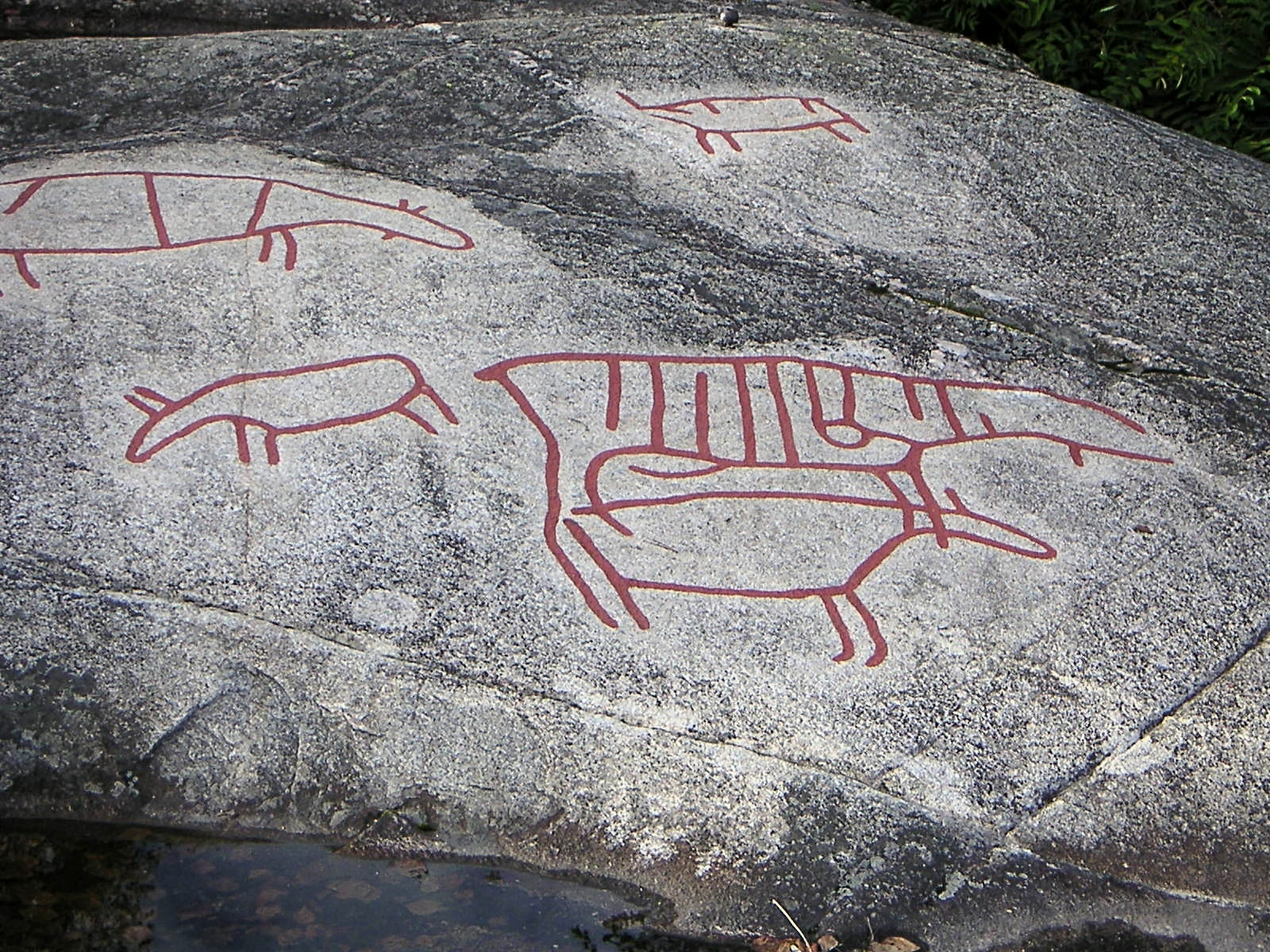

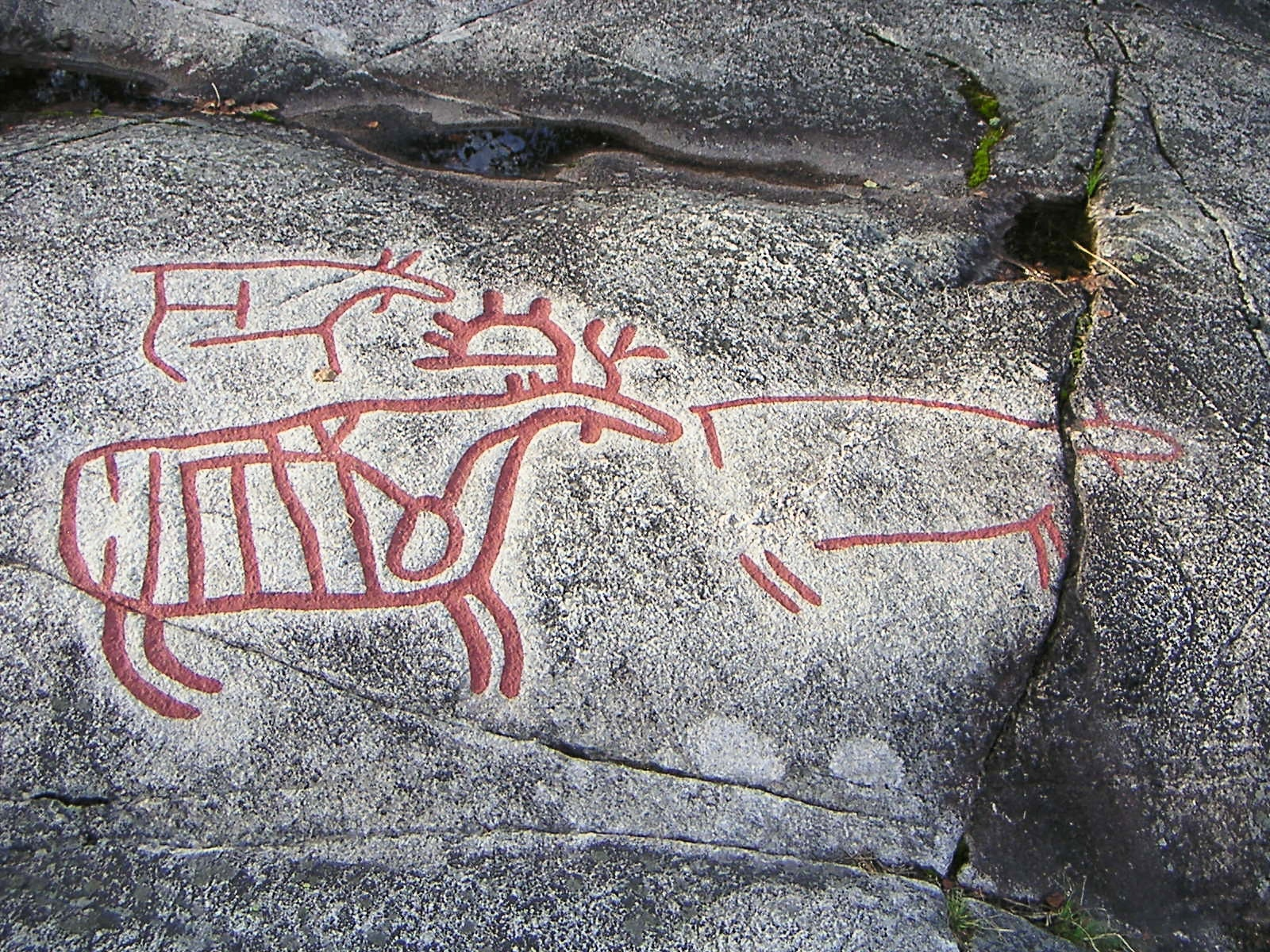

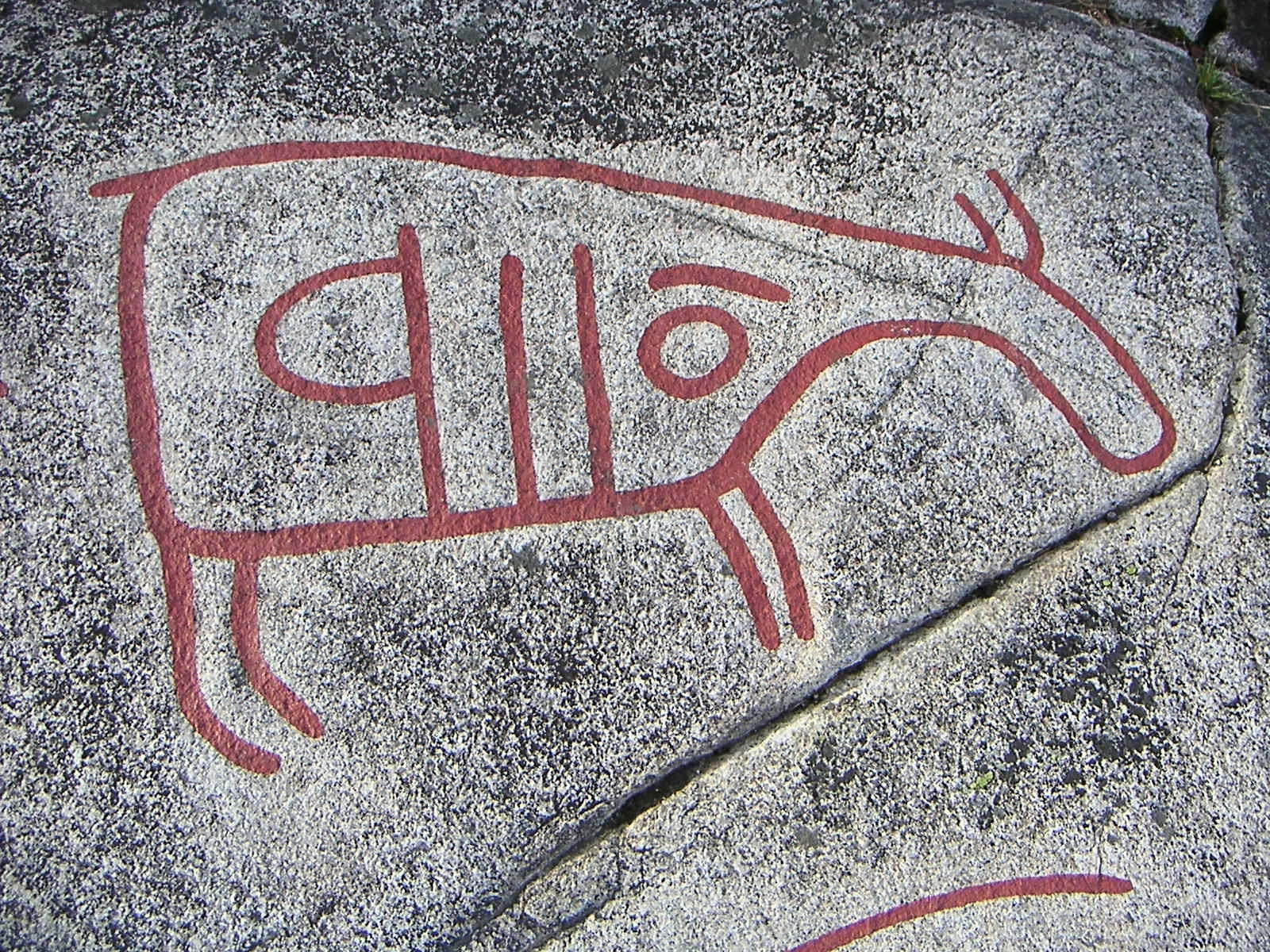

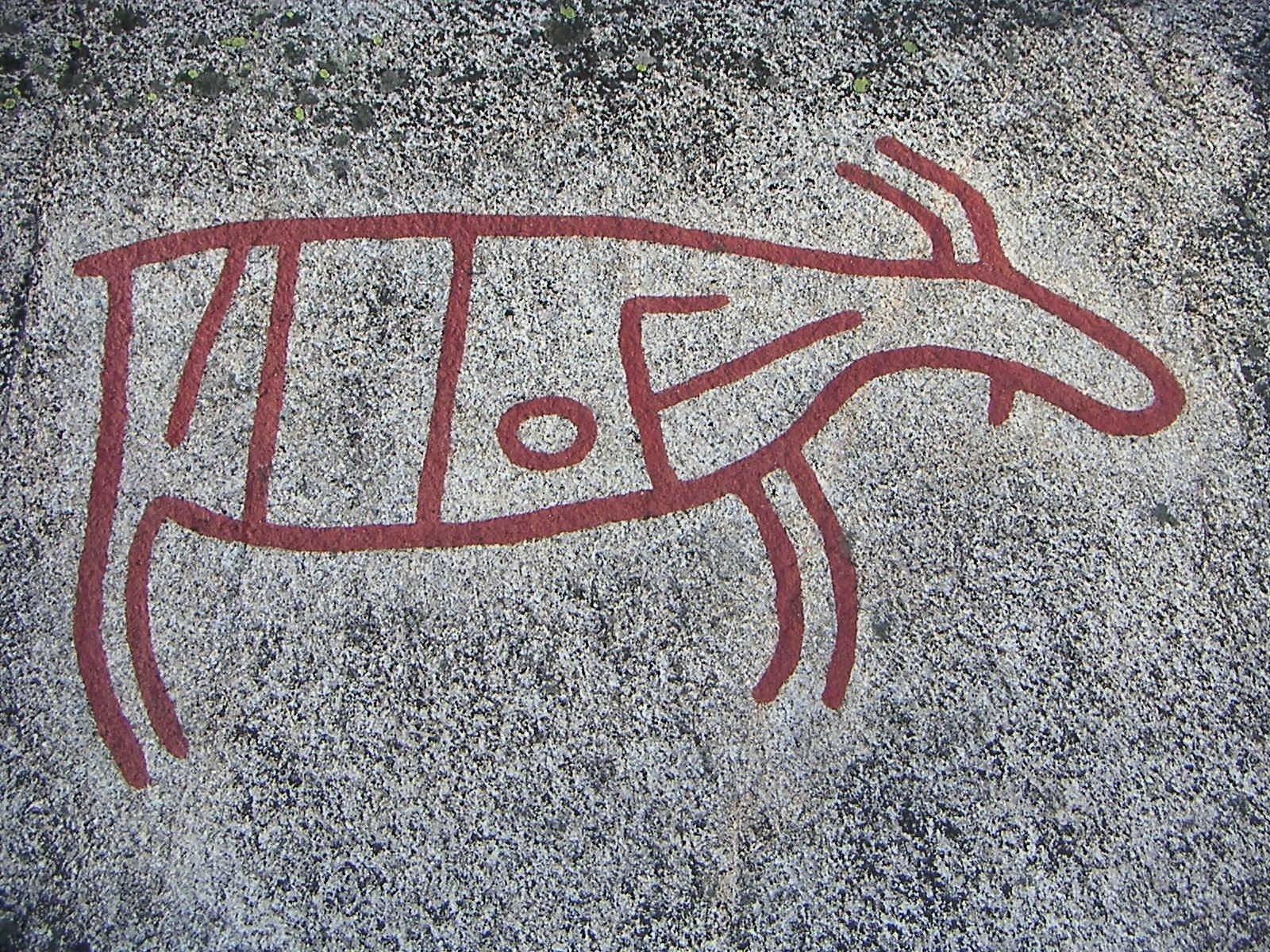

== See also ==
- Pre-historic art
- Petroglyph
- History of Norway
- List of World Heritage Sites in Europe
- Rock carvings in Norway
