= Rock carvings at Eidefoss =

Petroglyphs in Norway

Coordinates: 61°25′54″N 9°30′16″E

The rock carvings at Eidefoss are petroglyphs located near the river Fossen in Nord-Fron Municipality in Innlandet county, Norway.

== Description ==
The carvings comprise two images of moose, one measuring 31 centimetres (12 in) and the other 35 centimetres (14 in). The rock on which they are carved may have fallen from a west-facing, nearly vertical cliff about 20 metres (66 ft) from the river.

== Location ==
The location of the site is south of the whitewater where the river broadens to the east. When the river is at its normal levels, the rock is well away from the river.

== See also ==
- Pre-historic art
- Petroglyph
- History of Norway
- List of World Heritage Sites in Europe
- Rock carvings in Norway
