= List of rock carvings in Norway =

This article contains a list of rock carvings in Norway.

== Locations ==
Rock carvings in the different counties of Norway:

- Agder:
  - Rock carvings at Jærberget, Farsund Municipality
  - Rock carvings at Grobstranda (hunting), Farsund Municipality
  - Rock carvings at Forbergodden (hunting), Farsund Municipality
  - Rock carvings at Gerdberget (farming), Farsund Municipality
  - Rock carvings at Lista (various), Farsund Municipality
- Akershus:
  - Rock carvings at Kolsås (shipping), Bærum Municipality
  - Rock carvings at Bingfoss (hunting)
  - Rock carvings at Skjellerud gård (shipping), Frogn Municipality
  - Rock carvings at Søndre Ski gård (farming), Nordre Follo Municipality
  - Rock carvings at Nordre Ski gård (farming), Nordre Follo Municipality
- Buskerud:
  - Rock carvings at Skogerveien (hunting), Drammen Municipality
  - Rock carvings at Åskollen (hunting), Drammen Municipality
  - Rock carvings at Hvittingfoss (shipping, farming), Kongsberg Municipality
  - Rock carvings at Katsundholmen (hunting), Modum Municipality
  - Rock carvings at Kistefoss (hunting), Modum Municipality

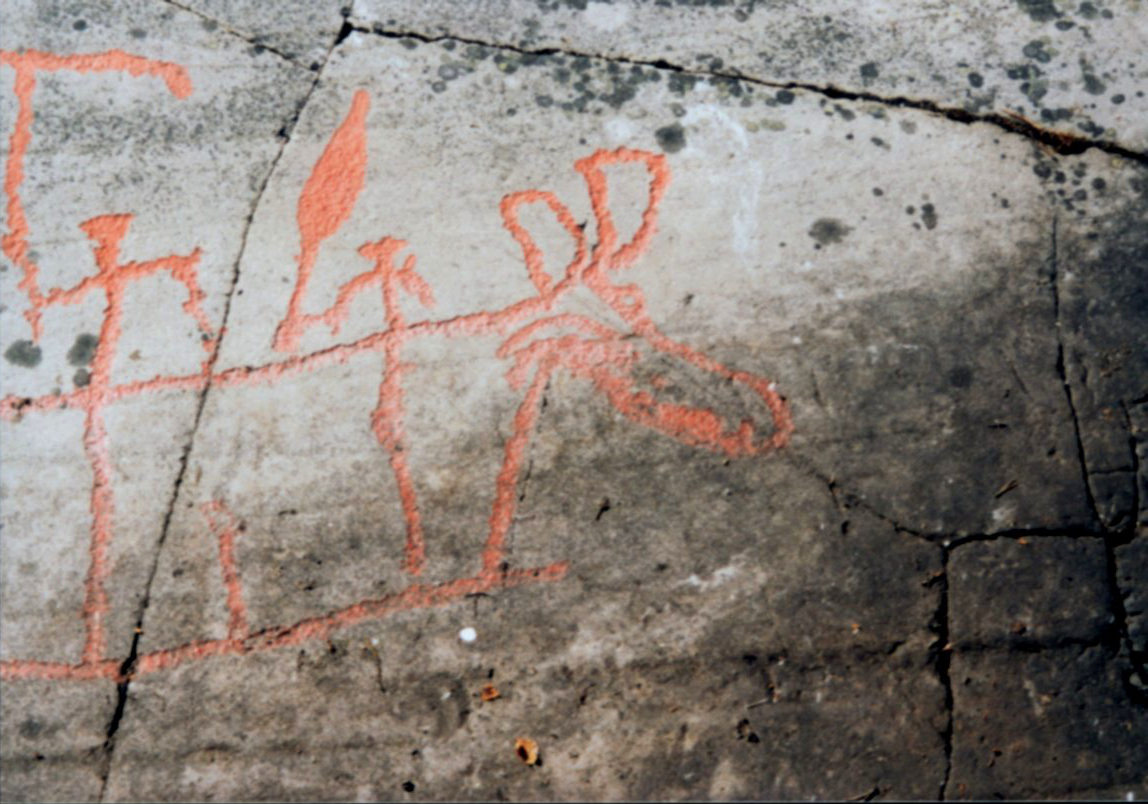
Detail from the rock carvings at Alta

- Finnmark:
  - Rock carvings at Alta, Alta Municipality
  - Rock carvings at Sandbukt, Sørøysundet on Sørøya in Hammerfest Municipality
  - Rock carvings at Gåshopen, Sørøy in Hammerfest Municipality
  - Helleristningsparken, Kvalsund with rocks removed from Leirbukt, Stokkeberg, and Fægfjord (all in Repparfjord in Hammerfest Municipality)
  - Rock carvings at Aldon, Nesseby Municipality

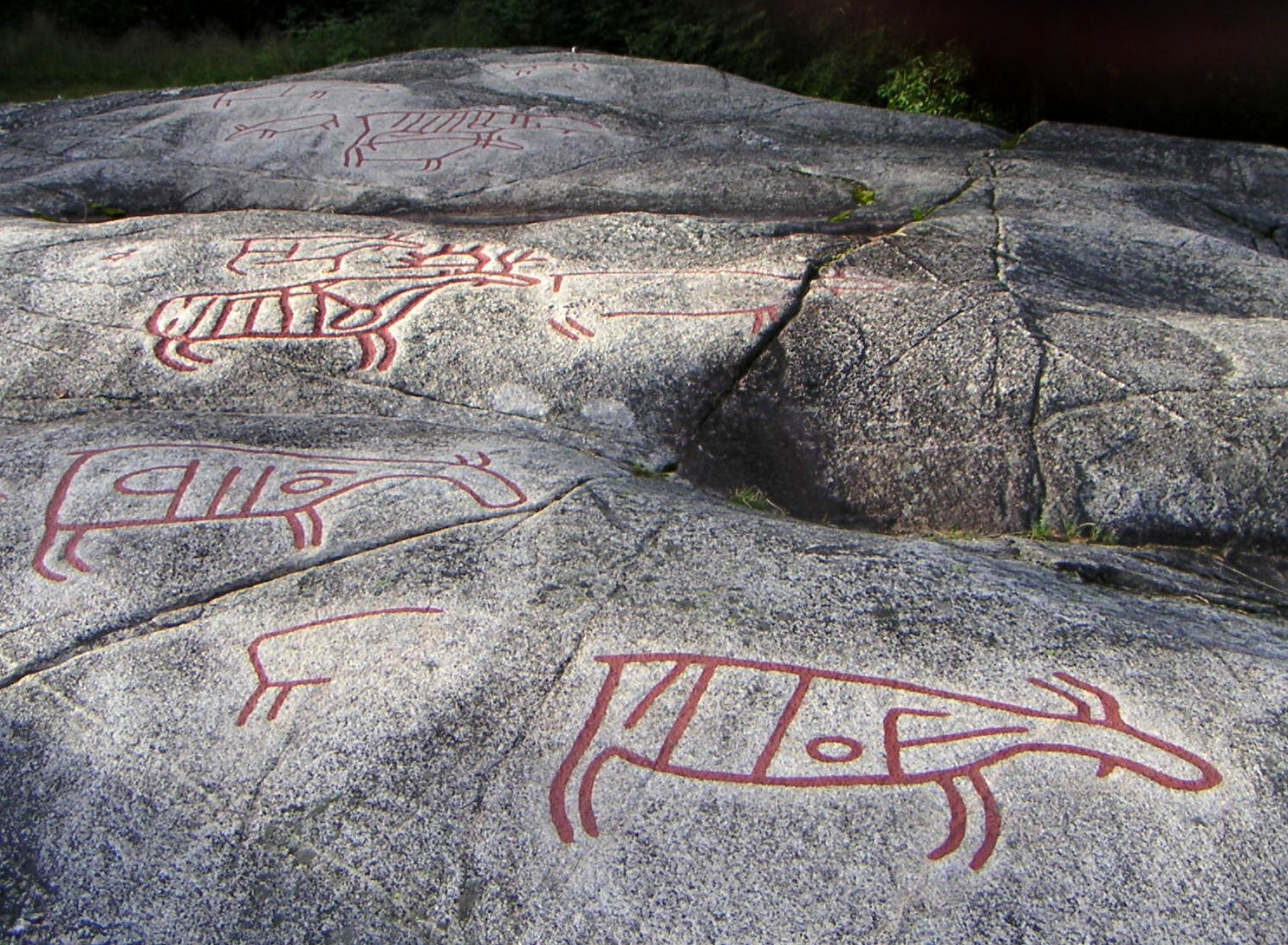
Rock carvings at Møllerstufossen, Nordre Land, more than 6000 years old

- Innlandet:
  - Rock carvings at Drotten (hunting), Lillehammer Municipality
  - Rock carvings at Eidefoss (hunting), Nord-Fron Municipality
  - Rock carvings at Glemmestad (hunting), Østre Toten Municipality
  - Rock carvings at Møllerstufossen (hunting), Nordre Land Municipality
  - Rock carvings at Stein (hunting), Ringsaker Municipality
  - Rock carvings at Vang church (cups), Vang Municipality

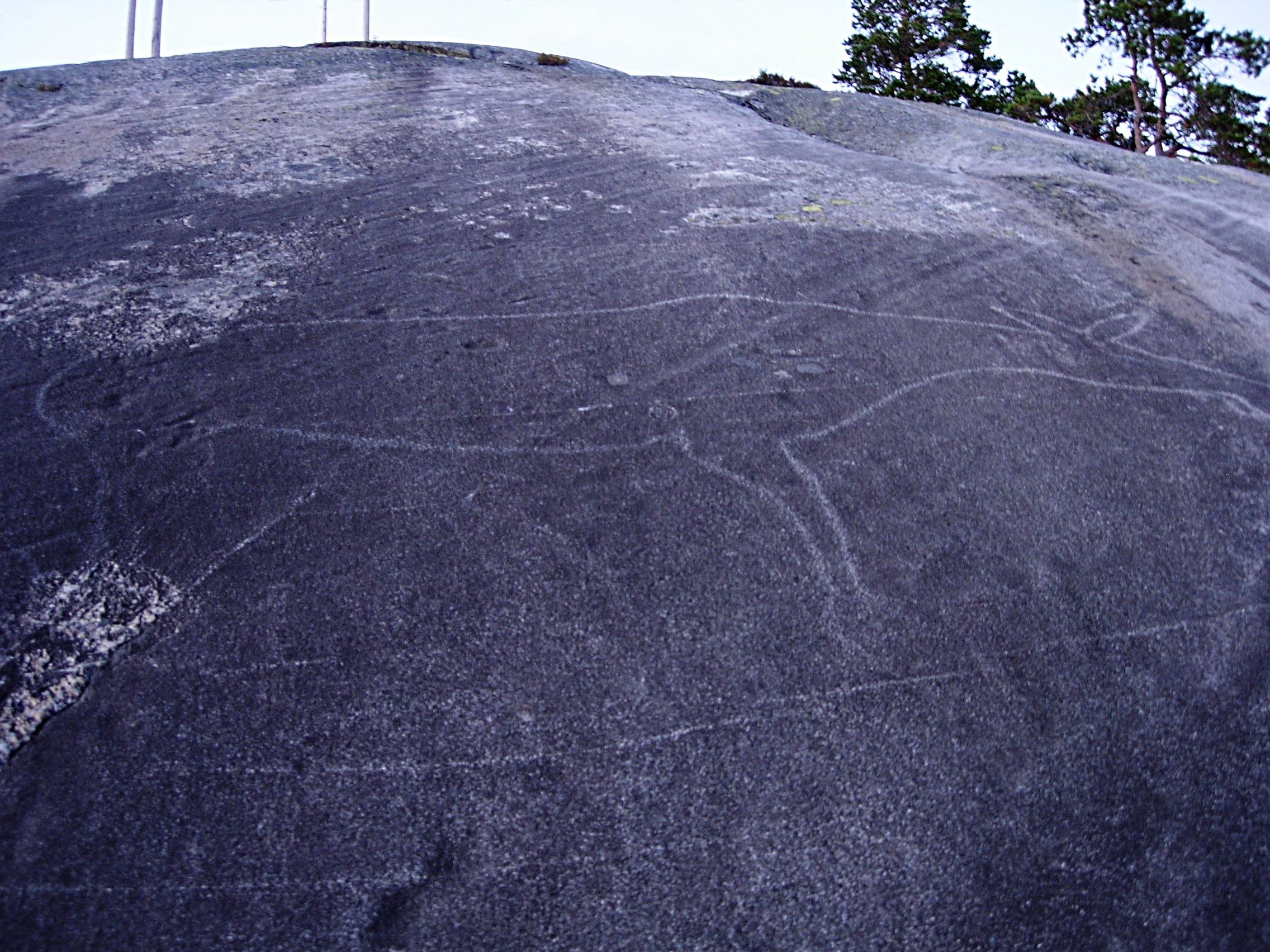
From Vågan

- Møre og Romsdal:
  - Rock carvings at Boggestranda, Molde Municipality
  - Rock carvings at Nord-Heggdal (fishing, hunting), Molde Municipality
  - Rock carvings at Søbstad, Averøy Municipality
  - Rock carvings at Reitaneset (hunting), Aukra Municipality
  - Rock carvings at Hinna (hunting), Tingvoll Municipality
  - Rock carvings at Honhammerneset (fishing), Tingvoll Municipality
  - Rock carvings in Central Norway
- Nordland:
  - Rock carvings at Vistnesdalen (hunting), Vevelstad Municipality
  - Rock carvings at Rødøy (hunting), Rødøy Municipality
  - Rock carvings at Klubba (hunting), Meløy Municipality
  - Rock carvings at Fykanvatn (hunting), Meløy Municipality
  - Rock carvings at Vågan (hunting), Bodø Municipality
  - Rock carvings at Sagelva (hunting), Hamarøy Municipality
  - Rock carvings at Leiknes (hunting), Hamarøy Municipality
  - Rock carvings at Valle (hunting), Lødingen Municipality
  - Rock carvings at Forså (fishing), Lødingen Municipality
  - Rock carvings at Sandvågmoen (cups), Steigen Municipality
  - Rock carvings at Forselv (hunting, fishing), Narvik Municipality
  - Rock carvings at Brennholtet (hunting), Narvik Municipality
  - Rock carvings at Herjangen (hunting), Narvik Municipality
  - Rock carvings at Kanstadfjorden (hunting, fishing), Lødingen Municipality
  - Rock carvings at Dønna (fallos), Dønna Municipality
  - Rock carvings in Central Norway
- Oslo:
  - Rock carvings at Brannfjell (farming), Oslo Municipality
  - Rock carvings at Blindern (farming), Oslo Municipality
  - Rock carvings at Ekebergsletta (farming), Oslo Municipality
  - Rock carvings at Fossumberget (farming), Oslo Municipality
  - Rock carvings at Gaustad (farming), Oslo Municipality
  - Rock carvings at Sjømannsskolen Ekeberg (hunting), Oslo Municipality
  - Rock carvings at Skillebekk (shipping), Oslo Municipality
- Rogaland:
  - Rock carvings at Fluberget (shipping), Stavanger Municipality
  - Rock carvings at Solbakk (shipping), Tau, Strand Municipality
  - Rock carvings at Austre Åmøy (shipping), Stavanger Municipality

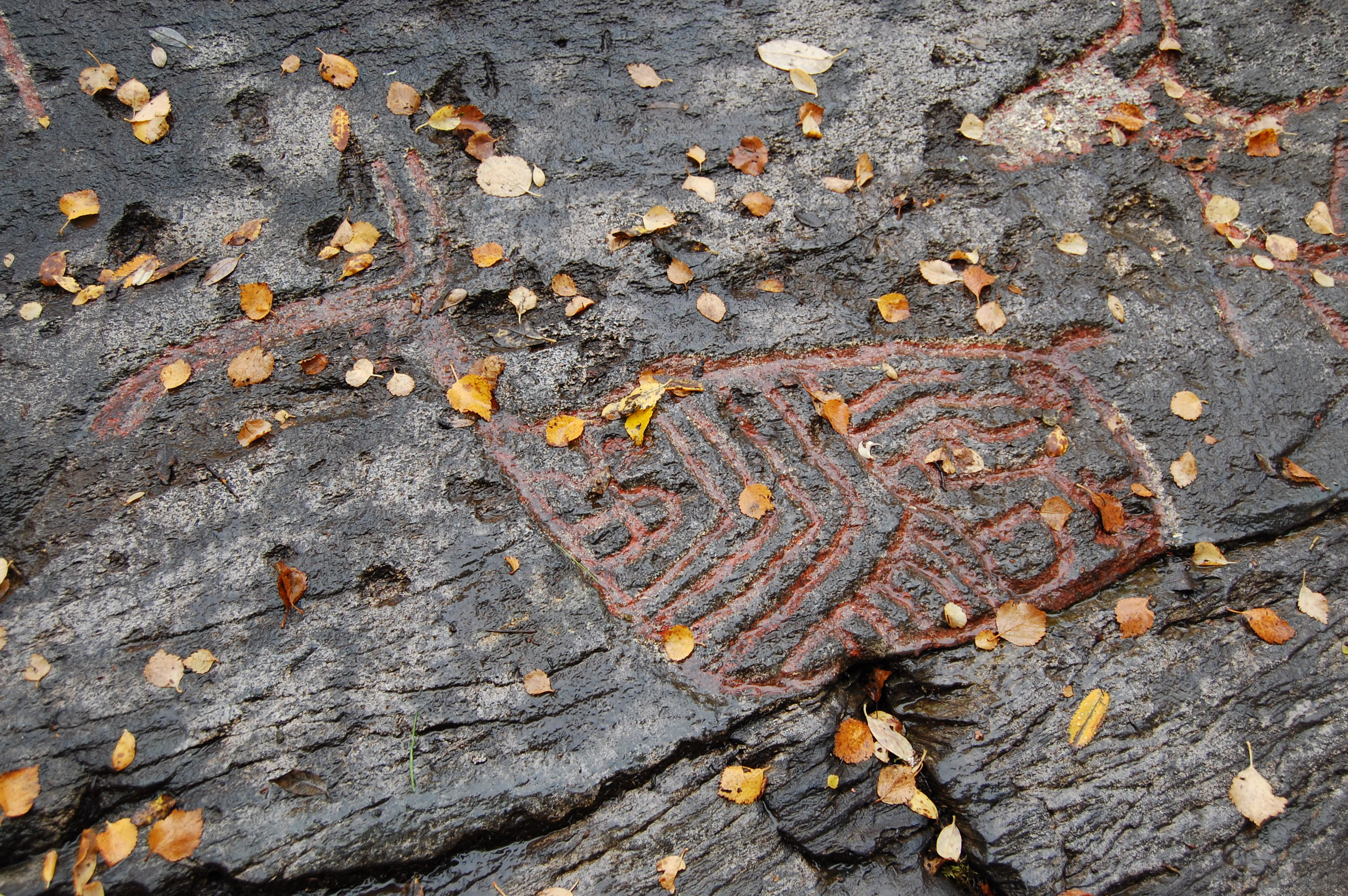
Bukkhammeren at Tennes.

- Troms:
  - Rock carvings at Tennes (hunting) in Balsfjord Municipality
  - Rock carvings at Skavberg in Tromsø Municipality
  - Rock carvings at Vik in Rolla in Ibestad Municipality
  - Rock carvings at Kjeøy in Harstad Municipality
  - Rock carvings at Åsli in Malangen in [[Balsfjord] Municipality]]
  - (Tromsø University Museum has some rocks removed from other sites in Troms and Finnmark)
- Trøndelag:
  - see: Rock carvings in Central Norway
  - Rock carvings at Bøla
  - Rock carvings at Bardal
  - Rock carvings at Evenhus
  - Rock carvings at Hell
  - Rock carvings at Leirfall
  - Rock carvings at Stykket
- Vestfold:
  - Rock carvings at Haugen gård (farming), Sandefjord Municipality
  - Rock carvings at Virik school (farming), Sandefjord Municipality
- Vestland:
  - Rock carvings at Ausevik (hunting), Kinn Municipality
  - Rock carvings at Vingen (hunting), Bremanger Municipality
- Østfold:
  - Rock carvings at Hjelmungen (farming), Halden Municipality
  - Rock carvings at Alkerød(farming), Halden Municipality
  - Rock carvings at Bakkehaugen (shipping), Ingedal, Sarpsborg Municipality
  - Rock carvings at Solberg (shipping), Sarpsborg Municipality
  - Rock carvings at Bossum farm (farming), Sarpsborg Municipality
  - Rock carvings at Busgård farm (farming), Sarpsborg Municipality
  - Rock carvings at Post-Hornes (farming), Sarpsborg Municipality
  - Rock carvings at Bø (farming), Sarpsborg Municipality
  - Rock carvings at Flatbeggårdene (farming), Sarpsborg Municipality
  - Rock carvings at Bjørnstad (shipping), Sarpsborg Municipality
  - Rock carvings at Østre Vik (farming), Sarpsborg Municipality
  - Rock carvings at Borgen (farming), Sarpsborg Municipality
  - Rock carvings at Hafslund (farming), Sarpsborg Municipality
  - Rock carvings at Begby (farming, shipping), Fredrikstad Municipality
  - Rock carvings at Lilleborge (farming), Fredrikstad Municipality
  - Rock carvings at Årum (farming), Sarpsborg Municipality
  - Rock carvings at Skjelin (farming), Fredrikstad Municipality
  - Rock carvings at Glomma (farming), Sarpsborg Municipality
  - Rock carvings at Kalnes Landbruksskole (farming, shipping), Sarpsborg Municipality
  - Rock carvings at Alvim (farming), Sarpsborg Municipality
  - Rock carvings at Hauge (farming), Fredrikstad Municipality
  - Rock carvings at Rå (farming), Fredrikstad Municipality
  - Rock carvings at Evje (farming), Fredrikstad Municipality

== See also ==
- Pre-historic art
- Petroglyph
- History of Norway
- List of World Heritage Sites in Europe
