= Hemskilen =

Nature reserve in Norway

Coordinates: 59.074°N 10.212°E

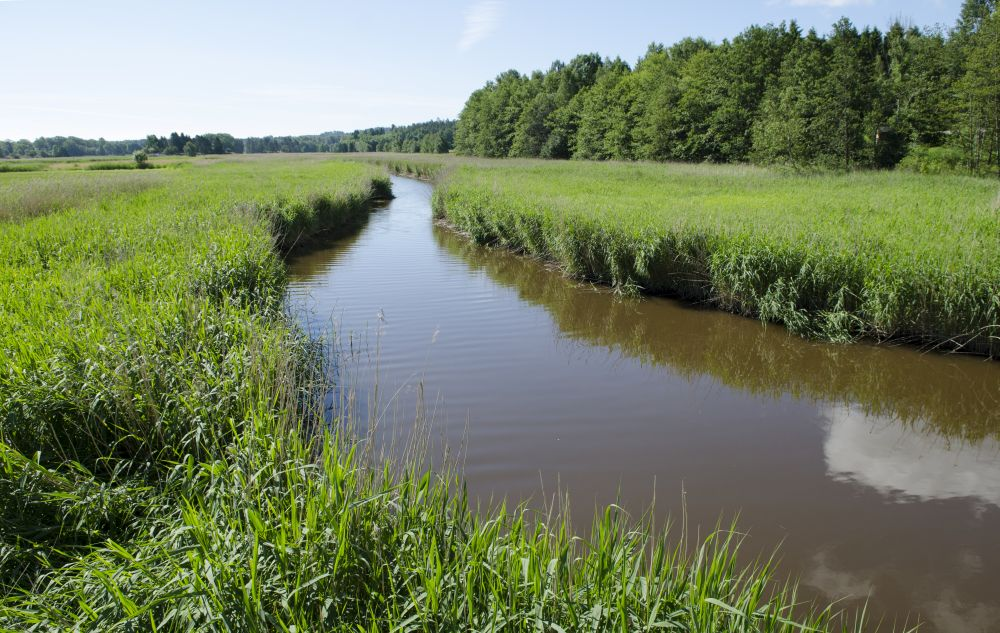
Hemskilen

Hemskilen is a plant and wildlife preserve with a wetland area known for its unique vegetation and fauna. It is located near the island Storøya on the border of Sandefjord Municipality and Larvik Municipality in Vestfold County. Measuring 335 decares (83 acres), Heskilen is one of the largest preserves of its kind in the county. A bird sanctuary was established on the outside of the preserve in 2009. The nature preserve was established in 1981 and consists mostly of wetland and mudflats. It is a regionally important site due to its avifauna, including sea birds, ducks, wading birds, geese, and perching birds. It is also one of Vestfold's most important habitats for the grey heron, while raptors such as the sea hawk and Western marsh harrier can also regularly be observed at Hemskilen.

The Pectoral sandpiper is one of the many rare bird species often observed at Hemskilen. It is one of the most important wetlands in Vestfold County. Hemskilen is also where the river Istre-Syrristelva (Istra) discharges into the ocean. 171 bird species have been recorded at Hemskilen. The area is open for Trout fishing in the spring.

The ancient monument Istrehågan is located 2 kilometres (1.2 mi) northwest of Hemskilen.
