= Husevågøy =

Island in Vestland, Norway

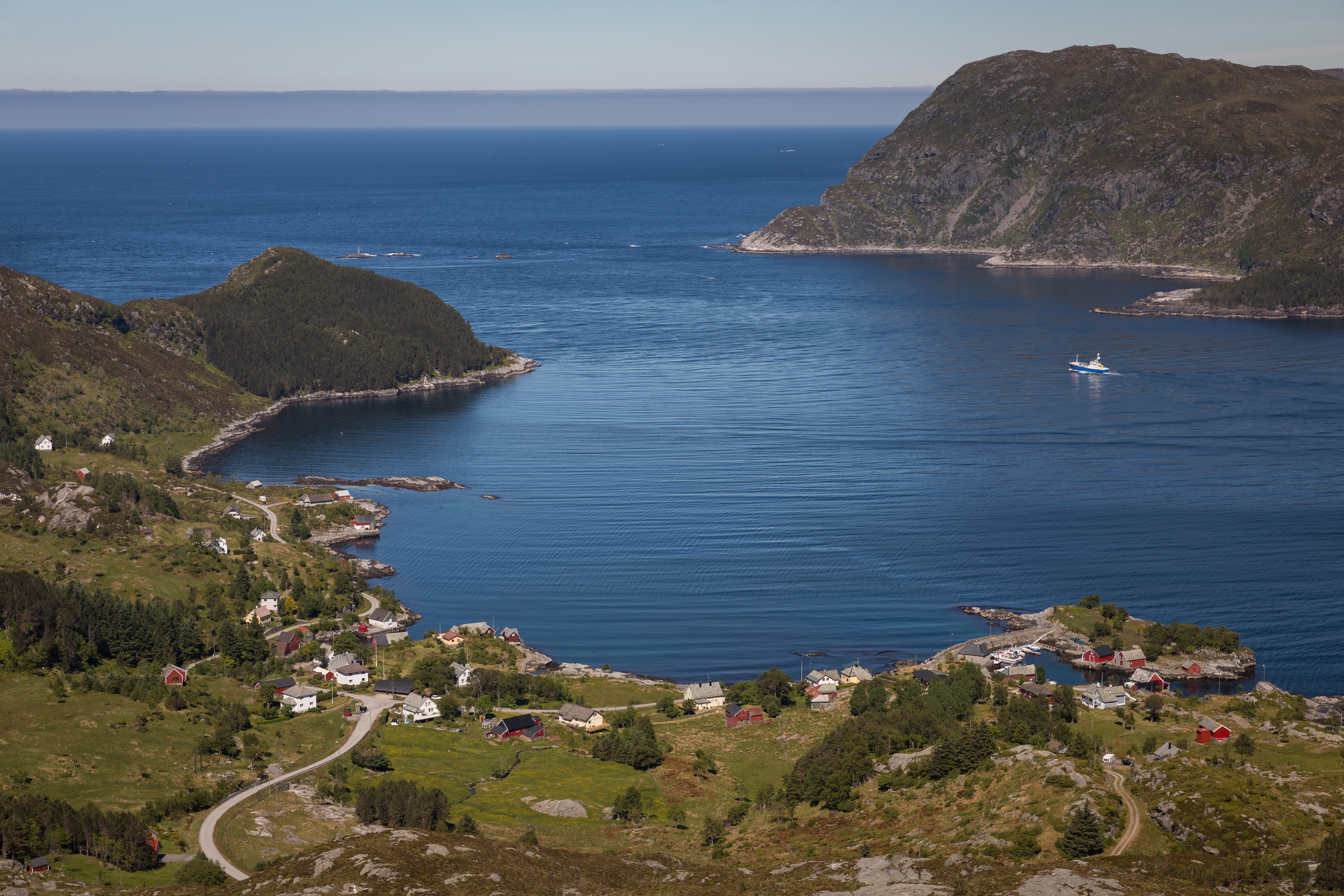
- View from Mt. Blåfjellet towards the island of Vågsøy
- Interactive map of Husevågøy

Geography
- Location: Vestland, Norway
- Coordinates: 61.9096°N 5.0468°E
- Area: 9.2 km^{2} (3.6 sq mi)
- Length: 6.4 km (3.98 mi)
- Width: 2.6 km (1.62 mi)
- Highest elevation: 330 m (1080 ft)
- Highest point: Krabbestigheida

Administration
- Norway
- County: Vestland
- Municipality: Kinn Municipality

Demographics
- Population: 50 (2018)

Husevågøy is an island in Kinn Municipality in Vestland county, Norway. The island lies at the outer part of the Nordfjorden, between Bremangerlandet to the south and Vågsøy to the north, and has an area of 9.2 square kilometres (3.6 sq mi).

The largest settlement on the island is Husevåg, on the northwestern side of Husevågøy, while Krabbestig and Tytingvåg are located on the southern side. Husevågøy is connected by ferry to both Måløy and Oldeide on Bremangerlandet. Settlement and economic activity have historically been linked to fishing, small-scale farming and seaborne transport. Husevåg is also registered as a state fishing harbour facility and has been described as a commercially active fishing harbour of high value.

Husevågøy has several recorded cultural heritage sites, including Trollholet and the rock carvings at Færeldemyra. Store norske leksikon describes Bronze Age rock carvings in serpentine rock on the island. A large occurrence of cauliflower coral has also been documented off Husevågøy, and the Klovningen Nature Reserve lies west of the island.

== Geography ==
Husevågøy lies at the outer part of Nordfjorden, between Bremangerlandet to the south and Vågsøy to the north. The Norwegian Mapping Authority registers Husevågøy as an island in the sea in Kinn Municipality, with coordinates 61.90689° N and 5.06414° E.

The island is rocky and has limited woodland. The landscape consists of coastal hills, mountainous areas, coves and sounds. Husevåg lies on the northwestern side of the island, while Krabbestig and Tytingvåg are on the southern side.

The highest point on Husevågøy is Krabbestigheida, 330 metres (1,080 ft) above sea level. Other marked elevations include Rønelden, locally known as Kletten, at 321 metres (1,053 ft), and Rauddalsegga at 319 metres (1,047 ft). The southern side of the island faces Fåfjorden, while the northern side faces the sound between Husevågøy and Vågsøy.

== Settlement and economy ==
Settlement on Husevågøy is mainly connected with Husevåg on the northwestern side of the island and with Krabbestig and Tytingvåg on the southern side. The farm name Husevåg is known in written forms from the 16th century. In Norske Gaardnavne, older forms include Huseuogh in 1563, Hußeuog in 1603, Husseuog in 1608 and 1667, and Hussevog in 1723. The name is explained as Húsavágr, where the first element refers to a place with houses, in contrast to nearby coves without settlement.

Husevåg was registered as a separate cadastral unit in the 18th century. In Matricull for Søe-Etatens Lægder i Aggerhuus Stift from 1777, the place is listed as "Huusevog" under Rogsund parish in Davik ship district, with cadastral number 93.

Fishing was important for Husevåg. A notice in Tromsøposten in December 1896 referred to herring fishing in Vågsfjorden and Sildegapet and mentioned a large catch at Husevågen in Davik municipality. Vågen in Husevåg gradually developed into a local fishing and harbour environment with boathouses, a quay and a breakwater.

In 1917, Gula Tidend described Husevåg as a hamlet close to the fishing grounds but in need of a better harbour, and reported that the state would begin work on a breakwater at Husevåg that spring. In a 2011 survey of state fishing harbours, Husevåg was listed as a state fishing harbour facility and described as a commercially active fishing harbour of high value.

== Transport ==
=== Ferry service ===
Husevågøy has ferry connections to both Måløy and Oldeide on Bremangerlandet. The ferry route operates between Måløy, Husevågøy and Oldeide and forms part of county road 616. Fjord1 lists calls at Husevågøy on the Oldeide–Måløy route. The ferry quay is located at Våganeset on the eastern side of the island, where the sound between Husevågøy and Vågsøy is narrowest.

=== Road network ===
From the ferry quay at Våganeset, a road runs westwards across the island to Husevåg, Tytingvåg and Krabbestig. The road between Husevåg and the ferry quay forms county road 5714, with a total length of about 6.2 kilometres (3.9 mi). Before the road and ferry connections were developed, boats, route boats and later school boats were the most important links between Husevågøy, Måløy and the mainland.

== Climate and natural environment ==
Husevågøy is situated at the outer part of Nordfjorden, close to the transition towards the open coastal waters near Stad. Its location gives the island an exposed coastal environment, while coves and sounds provide more sheltered local conditions. Store norske leksikon describes the island as rocky and with limited woodland.

The sound between Husevågøy and Vågsøy has good water exchange and forms part of the marine coastal landscape at the outer end of Nordfjord. The waters around the island are used for fishing, diving and outdoor recreation, but the marine natural environment is also vulnerable to disturbance and pollution.

A large occurrence of cauliflower coral has been documented off Husevågøy. In 2019, the County Governor withdrew an aquaculture discharge permit at the Husevågøy locality because of the risk of irreversible damage to an approximately 1.5-kilometre (0.93 mi) coral occurrence. The Institute of Marine Research assessed the cauliflower coral forest at Husevågøy as unique in Norway because of its large geographical extent and high density of individuals. According to the County Governor, the occurrence extended from about 25 metres (82 ft) to 100 metres (330 ft) depth, with the densest occurrence shallower than 40 metres (130 ft).

West of Husevågøy lies Klovningen Nature Reserve, which was protected on 28 May 1993 as part of a seabird conservation plan. The purpose of the protection is to provide good and safe living conditions for seabirds and to preserve an important nesting, migration and wintering site for seabirds with associated vegetation and wildlife. In the nature reserve, landing and movement on land and within a zone of about 50 metres (160 ft) from land are prohibited from 1 April to 31 July.

== Cultural heritage ==
Husevågøy has several known cultural heritage sites showing that the island has been used and inhabited since prehistoric times. Store norske leksikon mentions Bronze Age rock carvings in serpentine rock on Husevågøy. Several of the sites are within walking distance of the present-day settlements.

- Trollholet, also known as Trollehola or Trollhola, is a cave about 20 metres (66 ft) high and 30 metres (98 ft) deep at the northwestern end of the island. The cave is registered in Kulturminnesøk as an automatically protected settlement and activity area with cultural heritage ID 6086. Trial excavation in 1924 demonstrated cultural layers in the cave, and Kulturminnesøk dates the locality to the pre-Reformation period.
- The rock carvings at Færeldemyra form an automatically protected rock art site and soapstone quarry near Krabbestig. The locality is registered in Kulturminnesøk with cultural heritage ID 35550. The field includes boat figures, cup marks and other figures in the serpentine rock, and the same rock surface also shows traces of soapstone vessel extraction.
- At Ramsevika by Raudesteinbakken there is a large soapstone boulder with traces of extraction of vessel blanks. The site is registered in Kulturminnesøk as an automatically protected soapstone quarry with cultural heritage ID 66542.
- In Tytingvåg, settlement sites from the Late Stone Age have been registered. Tytingvåg 1 is registered in Kulturminnesøk as an automatically protected settlement and activity area with cultural heritage ID 25649.
- At the southern end of the island is Tytingvåg cemetery, established in 1918 to serve the settlements of Oldeide, Husevåg and Tytingvåg. The cemetery has a small bell house and is a local cultural heritage site.

== History ==
=== Farm and village history ===
Husevåg was historically a coastal settlement where fishing, small-scale farming and seaborne transport were closely connected. In the 18th century, Husevåg was also part of the ownership and trading environment around the trading post of Vågsberget. Kringom states that in 1740 Modesta Fester took over the trading post and privilege at Vågsberget, the inn at Måløyna and, among other properties, the farms Våge, Holevik, Færestrand, Husevåg and "Gautestrand".

The sea route was for a long time the most important connection between Husevågøy and the outside world. Before the road and ferry connections were developed, traffic depended on private boats, fishing boats, route boats and later school boats. This influenced daily life, schooling, trade and work journeys.

=== Schools and community life ===
Husevåg became a separate school district in 1892. In the first years, teaching was conducted as a travelling school in the village before Husevåg got its own schoolhouse. The schoolhouse was built in 1914 and taken into use in 1915. The school remained in operation until 2002, when the pupils were transferred to Skram school in Måløy.

A schoolhouse was built in Tytingvåg in 1926. It served the hamlets of Krabbestig and Tytingvåg and also functioned as a local meeting house for youth associations, shooting associations, choirs, bazaars and other village events. The school was closed in 1982.

Husevåg received a postal agency from 1 January 1935. Fjordenes Tidende reported in 1934 that the name would be Husevåg post office agency, that teacher Sigurd Husevåg had been appointed postal agent, and that a mail route between Husevåg and Måløy would be started twice a week. A permanent telephone connection was also a local issue. In 1932, Davik municipal council considered the question of a national telephone connection to Husevåg after correspondence from the Telegraph Administration earlier that autumn.

=== Second World War ===
During the Second World War, the German occupation authorities established observation posts on Husevågøy. The first was on the western side of Rønelden/Kletten, while a later post was placed at Hovdeneset light on the northern side of the island. From there, ship traffic at the entrance to Nordfjord could be monitored.

The observation post at Hovdeneset became relevant during the Måløy Raid on 27 December 1941. In the book Folk før IV. Tjueni historier frå Nordfjord, the raid is described from Husevåg through the memories of Astrid Husevåg Oppedal, who as a child saw the British ships entering the fjord mouth that morning.

The Måløy Raid also had consequences for several young men from Husevåg. The same book describes Johan Husevåg, who together with others from the village reached British vessels after the raid and later became part of the war effort outside Norway. The schoolhouse in Husevåg was requisitioned by German forces for accommodation and quarters, and teaching had to take place in private homes in the village for periods of time.

=== Strandakarane shipwreck ===
In October 1903, Ingebrigt Jakobsen and his sons Peder, Jakob and Johan died after setting out from Husevågøy for longline fishing in a six-oared boat. The shipwreck is associated with the waters at Veststeinsundet, between Klovningen and Veststeinen off Husevågøy, and has later been described in local history sources as an event that left a mark on the village.

== Outdoor recreation ==
Husevågøy has several marked hiking trails to viewpoints and cultural heritage sites. UT.no describes, among others, hikes to Trollehola and the rock carvings at Færeldemyra, to Rauddalsegga and to Kletten/Rønelden.

- The hike to Trollehola and the rock carvings at Færeldemyra runs from Husevåg to the western side of the island. UT.no describes it as a marked round trip or return walk with cultural heritage sites at Færeldemyra and a further path to Trollehola.
- The hike to Rauddalsegga runs from the area above Husevåg via Blåfjellet to Rauddalsegga.
- The hike to Kletten runs from Husevåg to Rønelden, which UT.no gives as 321 metres (1,053 ft) above sea level. The summit is locally known as Kletten.

In addition to hiking and cycling, the area around Husevågøy is used for recreational fishing, diving and birdwatching.

== Administrative history ==
Husevågøy was formerly part of Davik Municipality. In 1964, Husevågøy and Gangsøy were transferred from Davik to the new Vågsøy Municipality. From 2020, the area became part of Kinn Municipality after Vågsøy and Flora were merged.

== Gallery ==
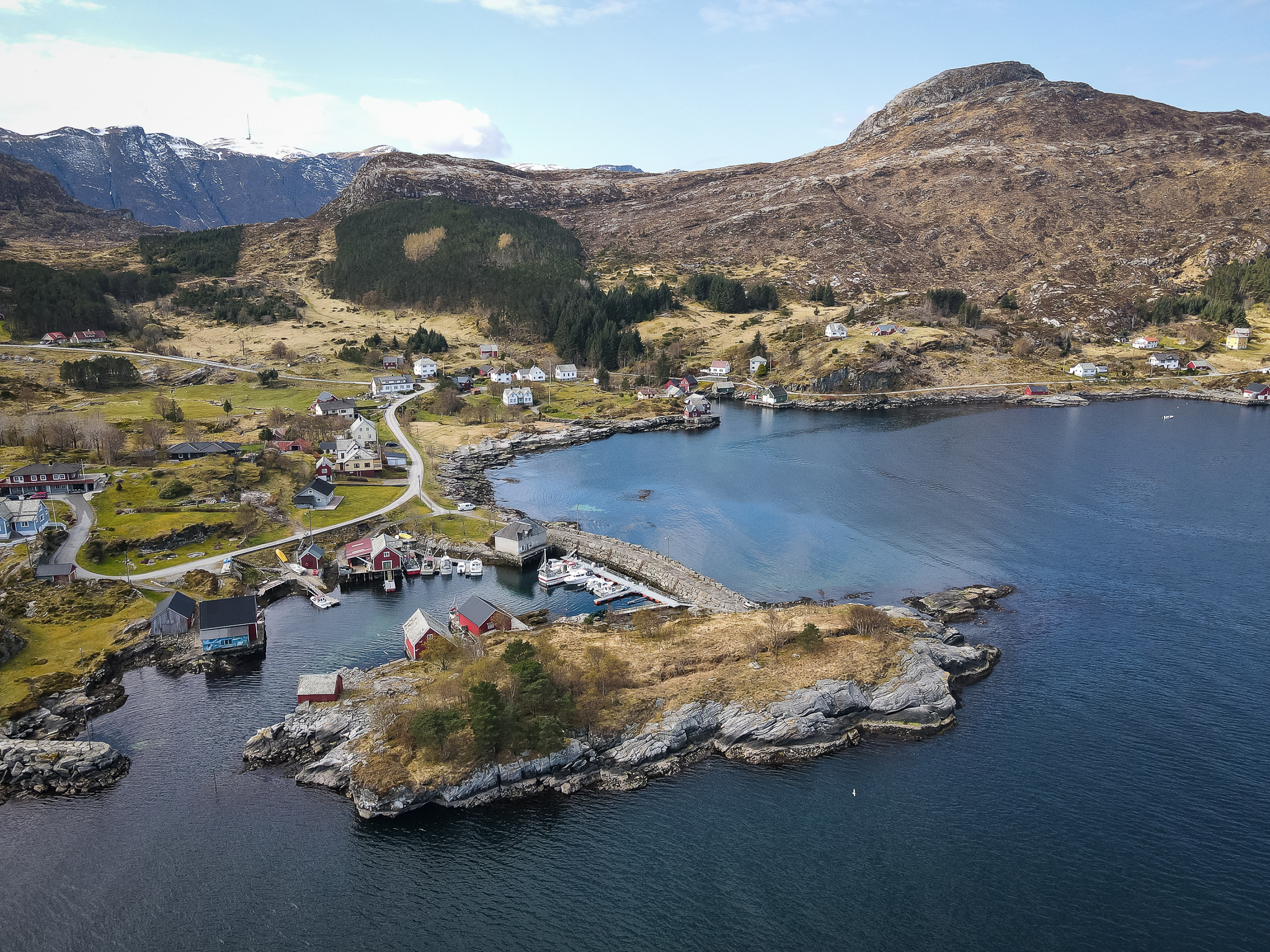
Aerial view of Husevåg on Husevågøy

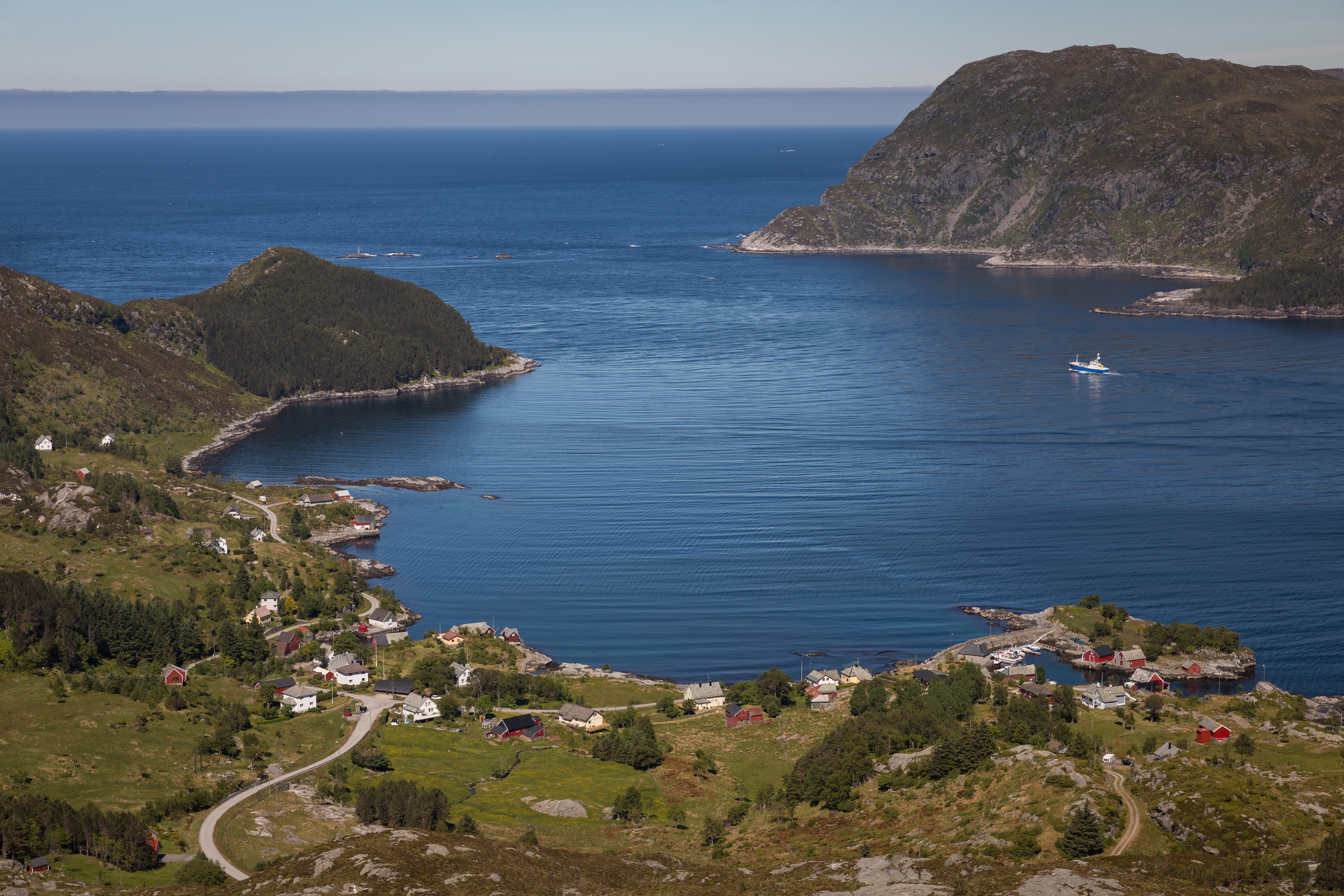
Husevåg coastal village on the north-western side of Husevågøy

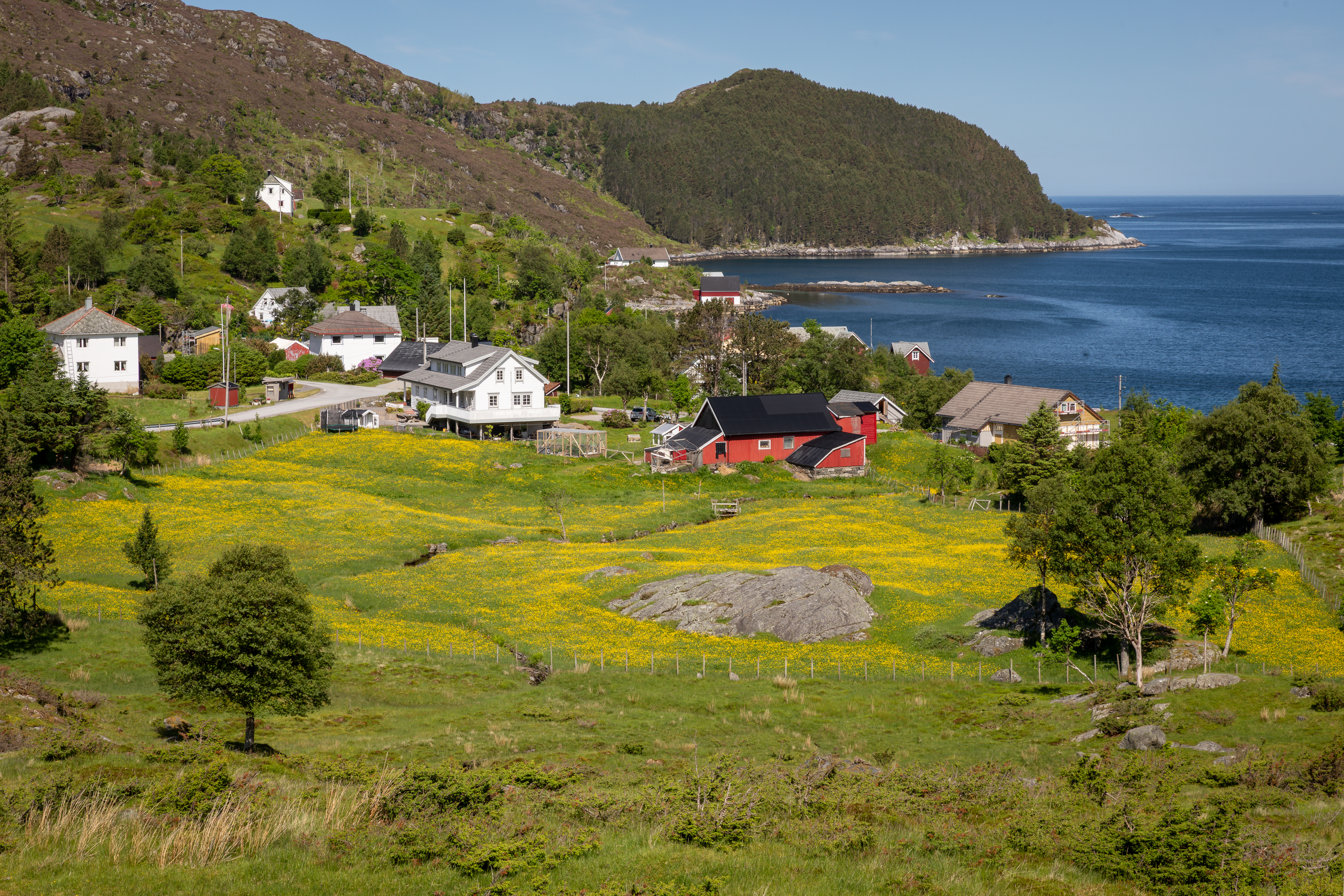
Husevåg seen across a meadow towards the coast

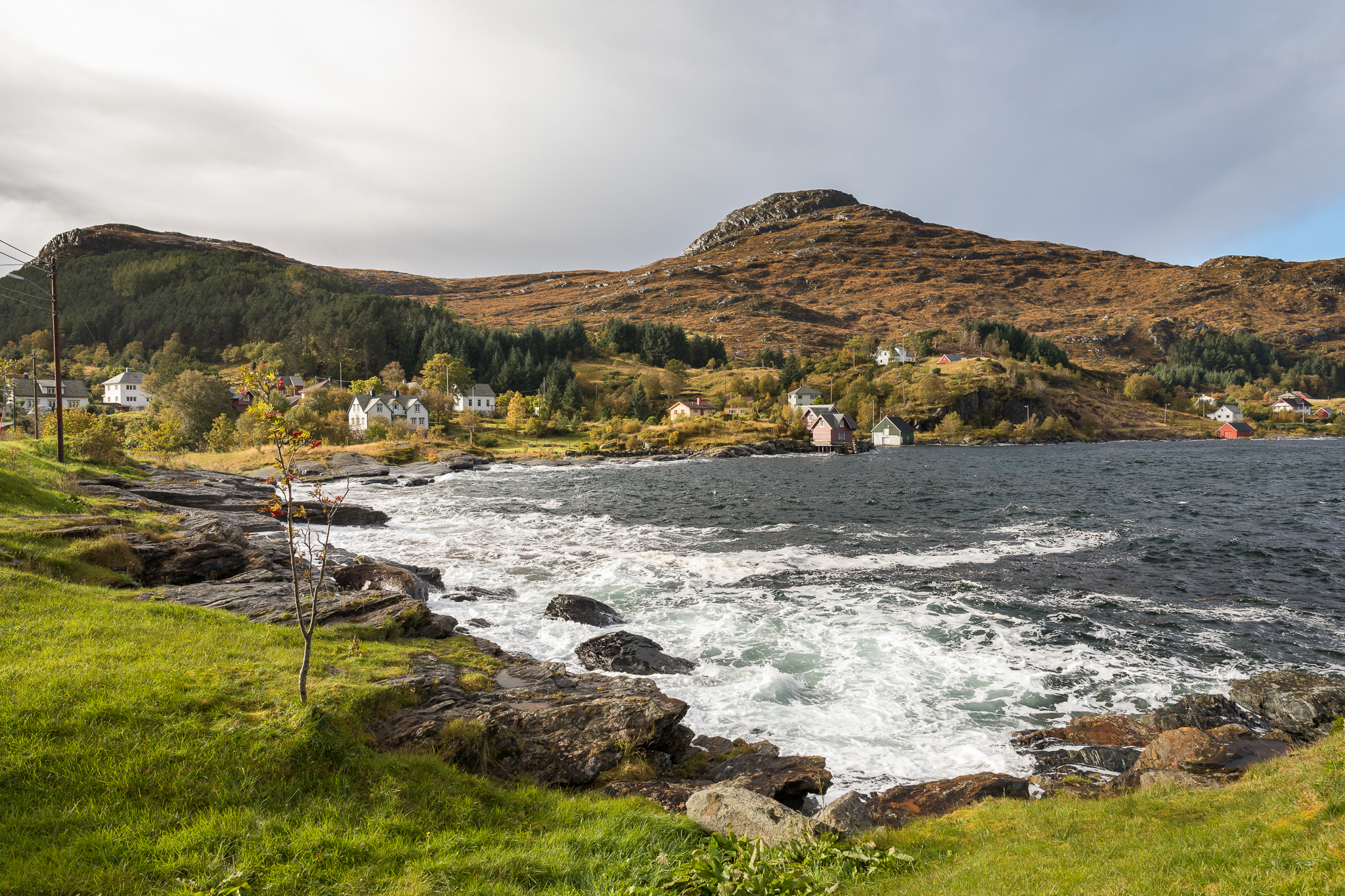
Coastal landscape at Husevåg on Husevågøy

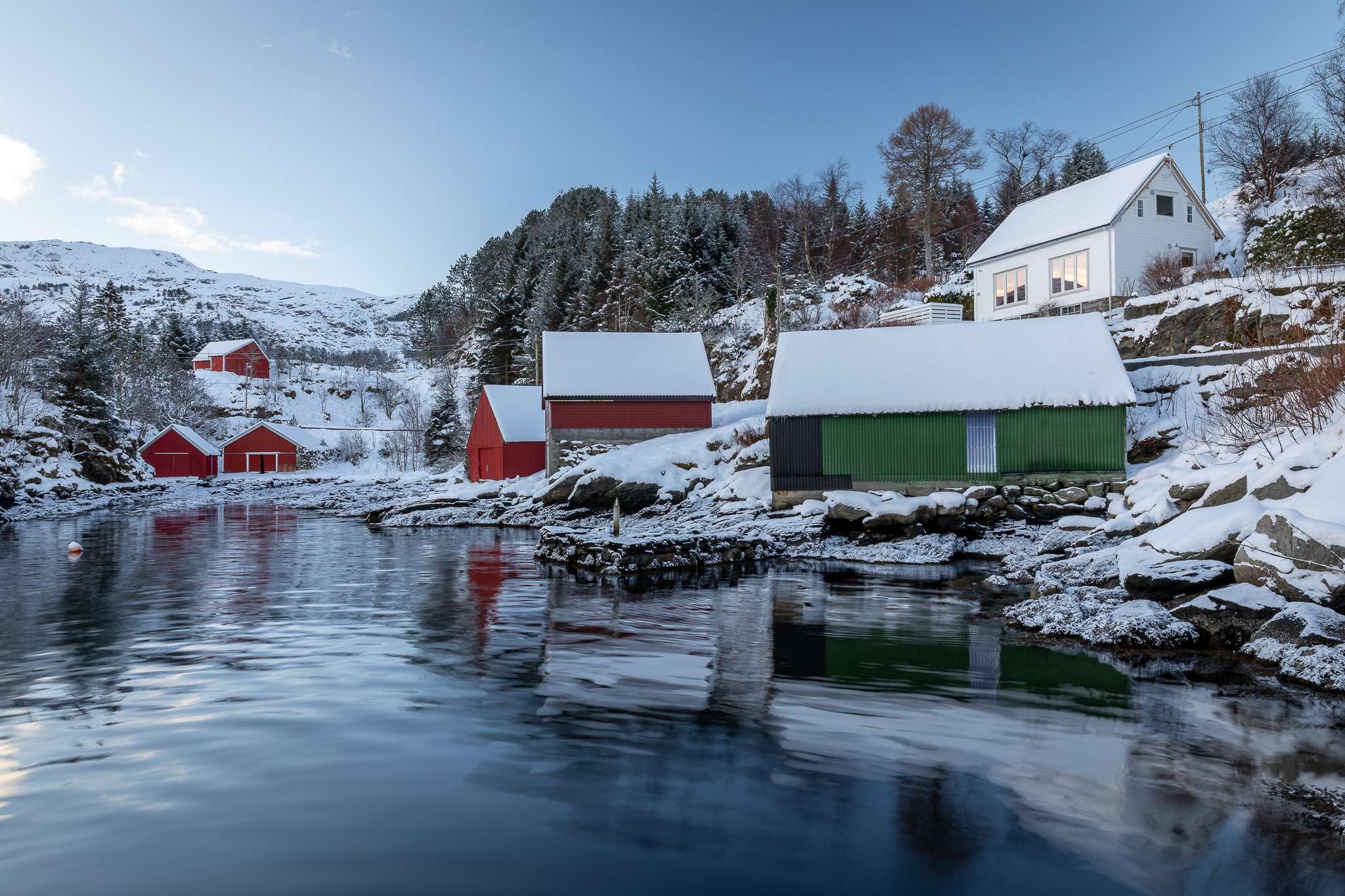
Vågen in Husevåg on a winter day, with boathouses along the bay

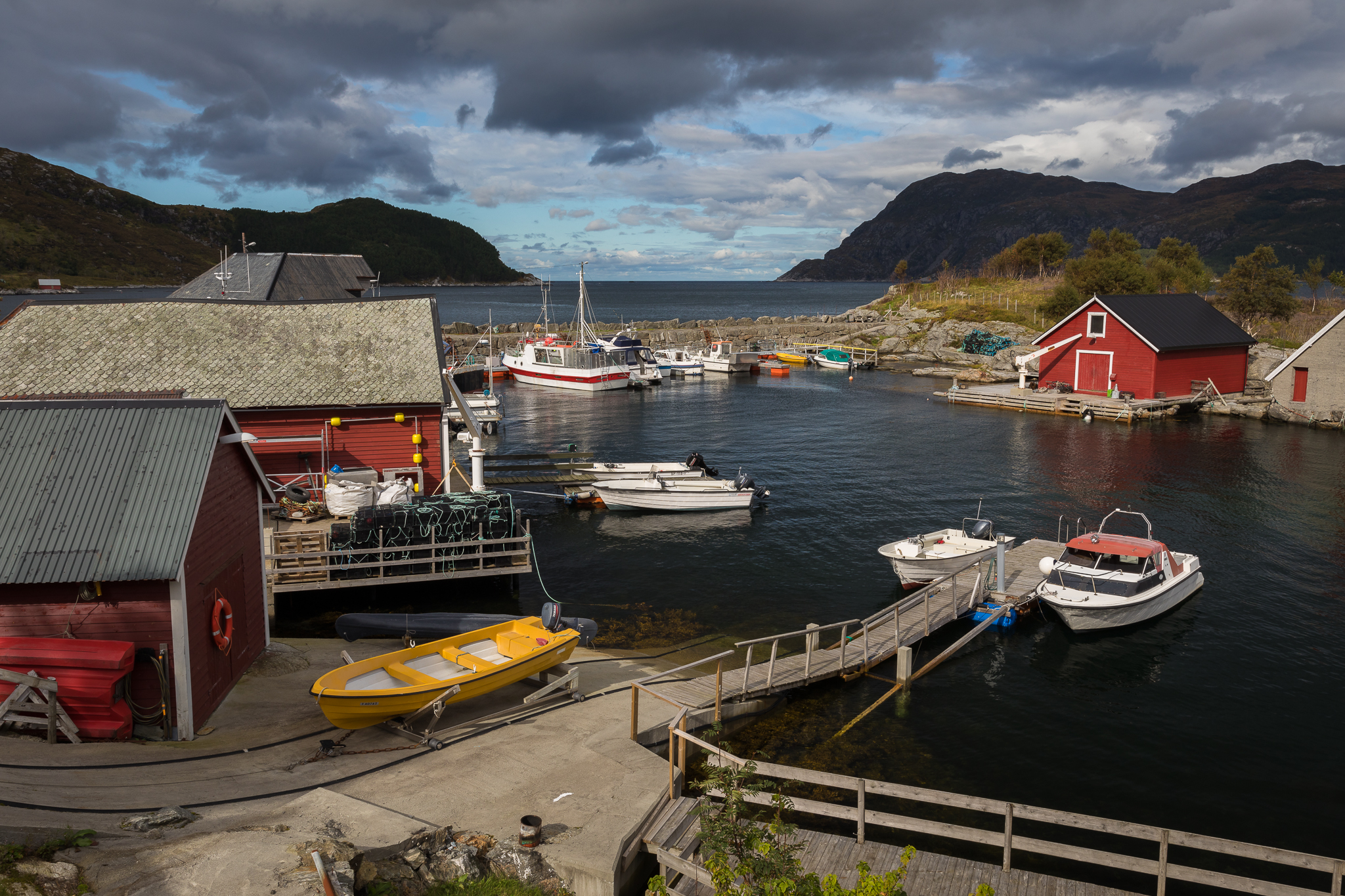
Harbour at Husevåg on Husevågøy

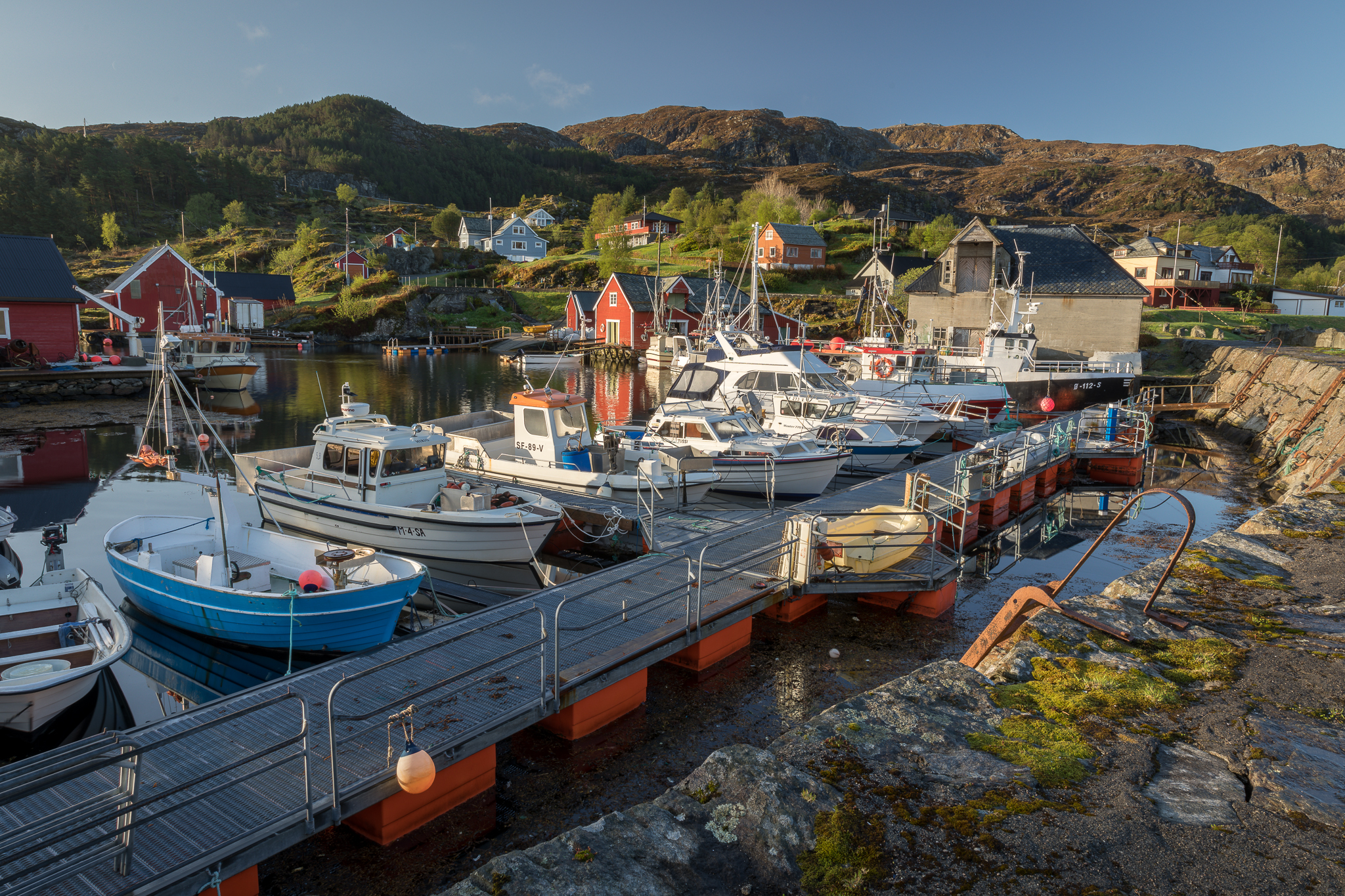
The fishing harbour in Husevåg

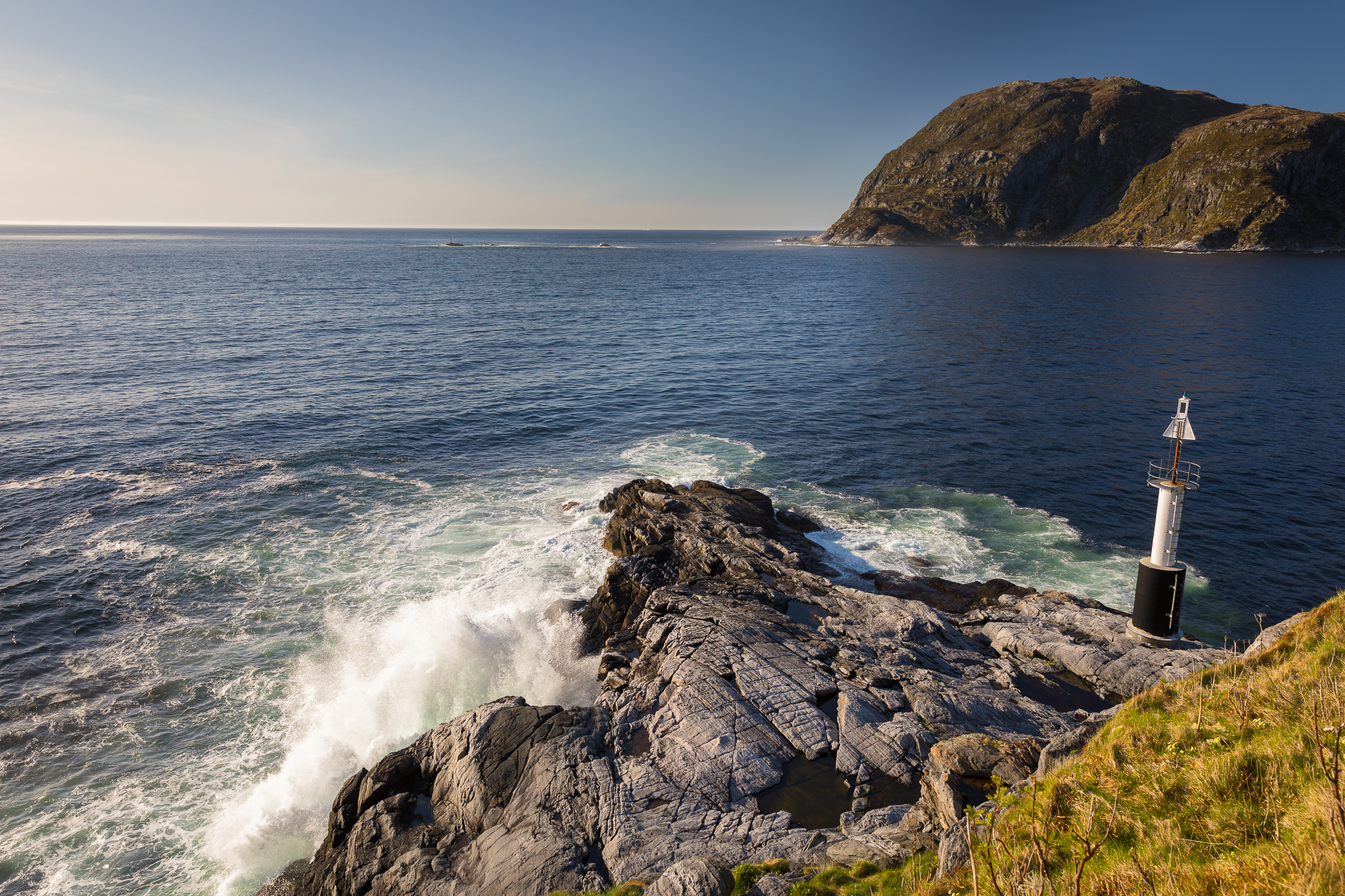
Hovdeneset light on the north-western tip of Husevågøy

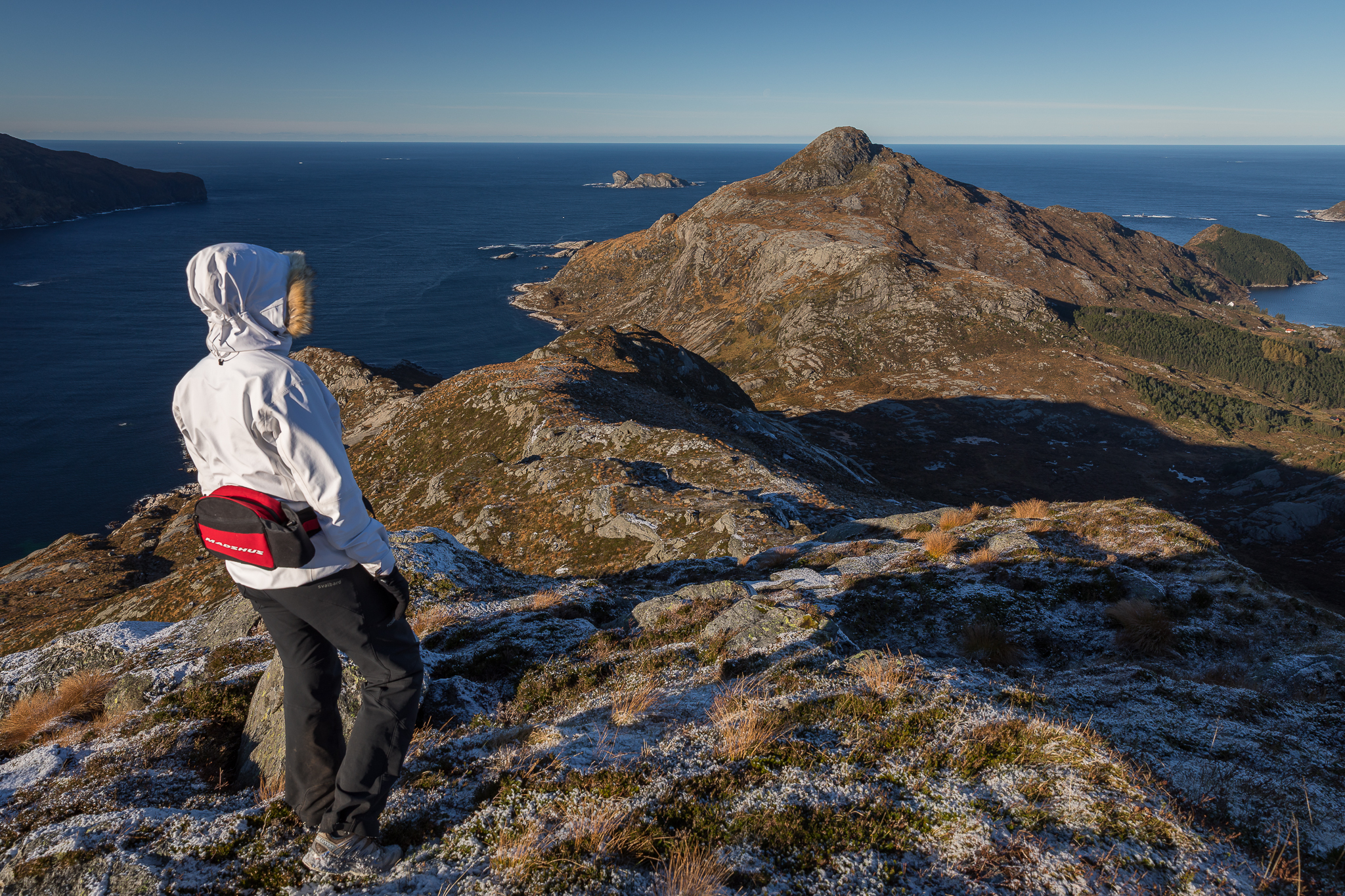
View from Raudalsegga towards the Stad Sea

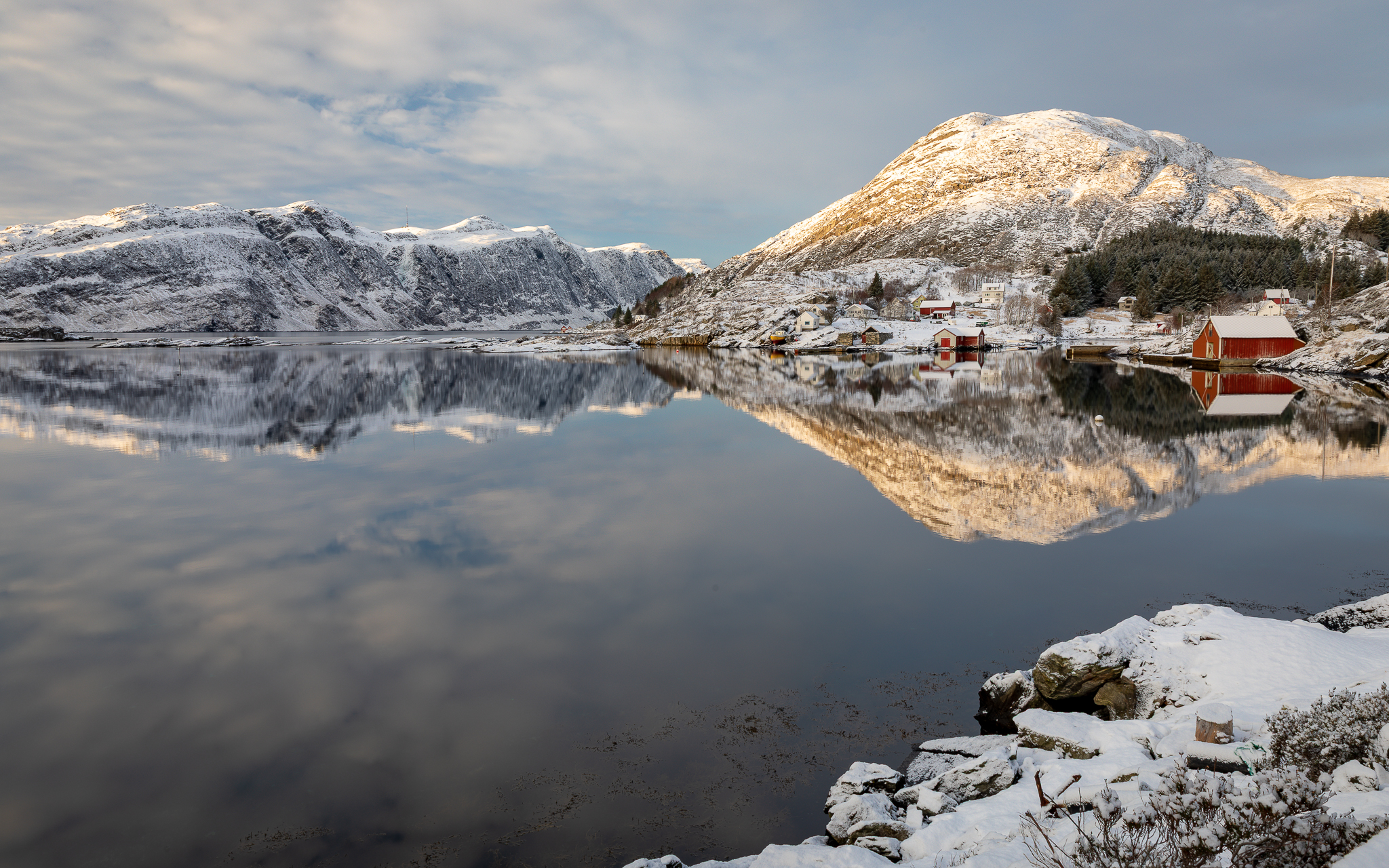
Tytingvåg on the southern side of Husevågøy

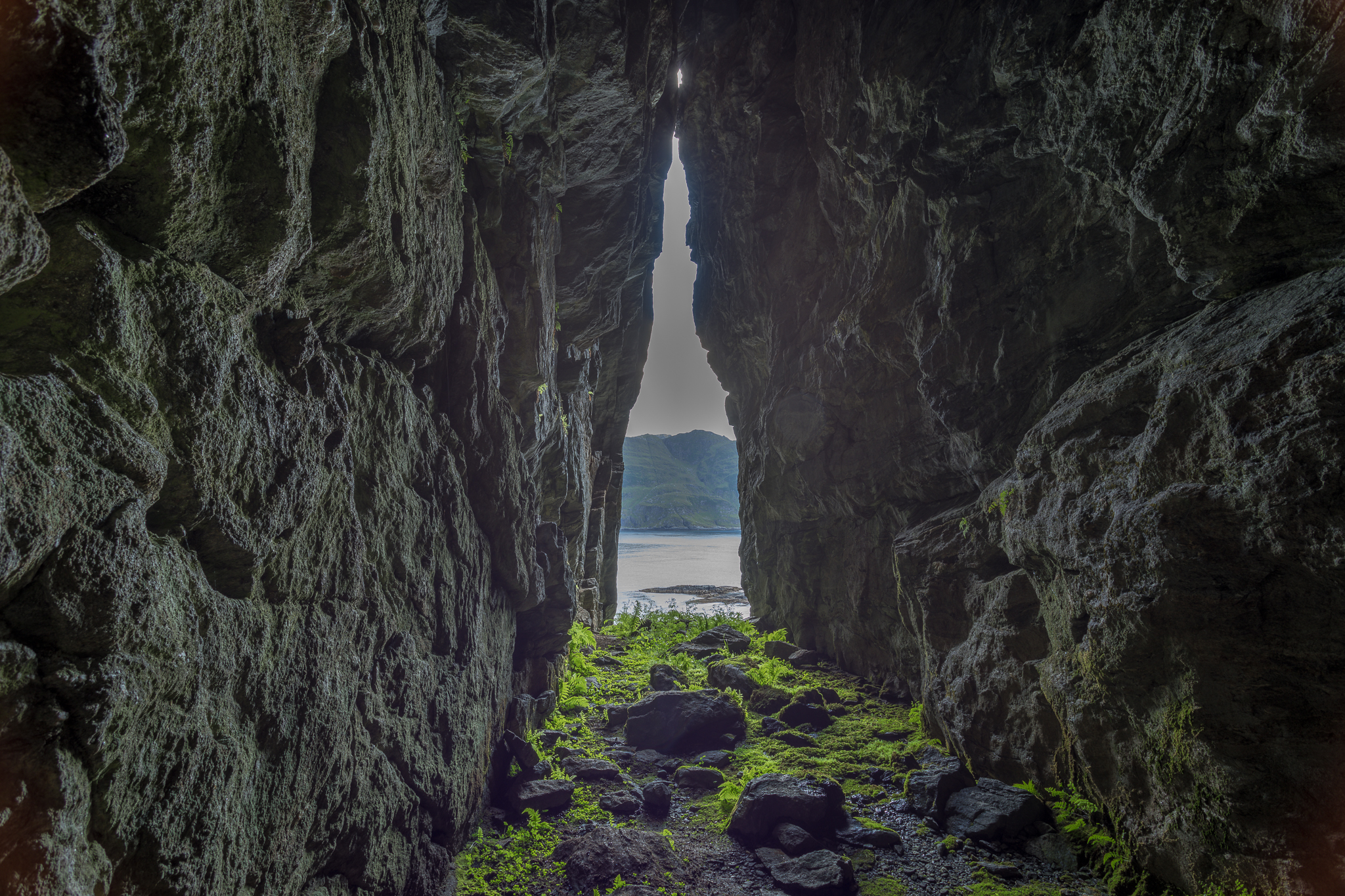
Trollholet cave on Husevågøy

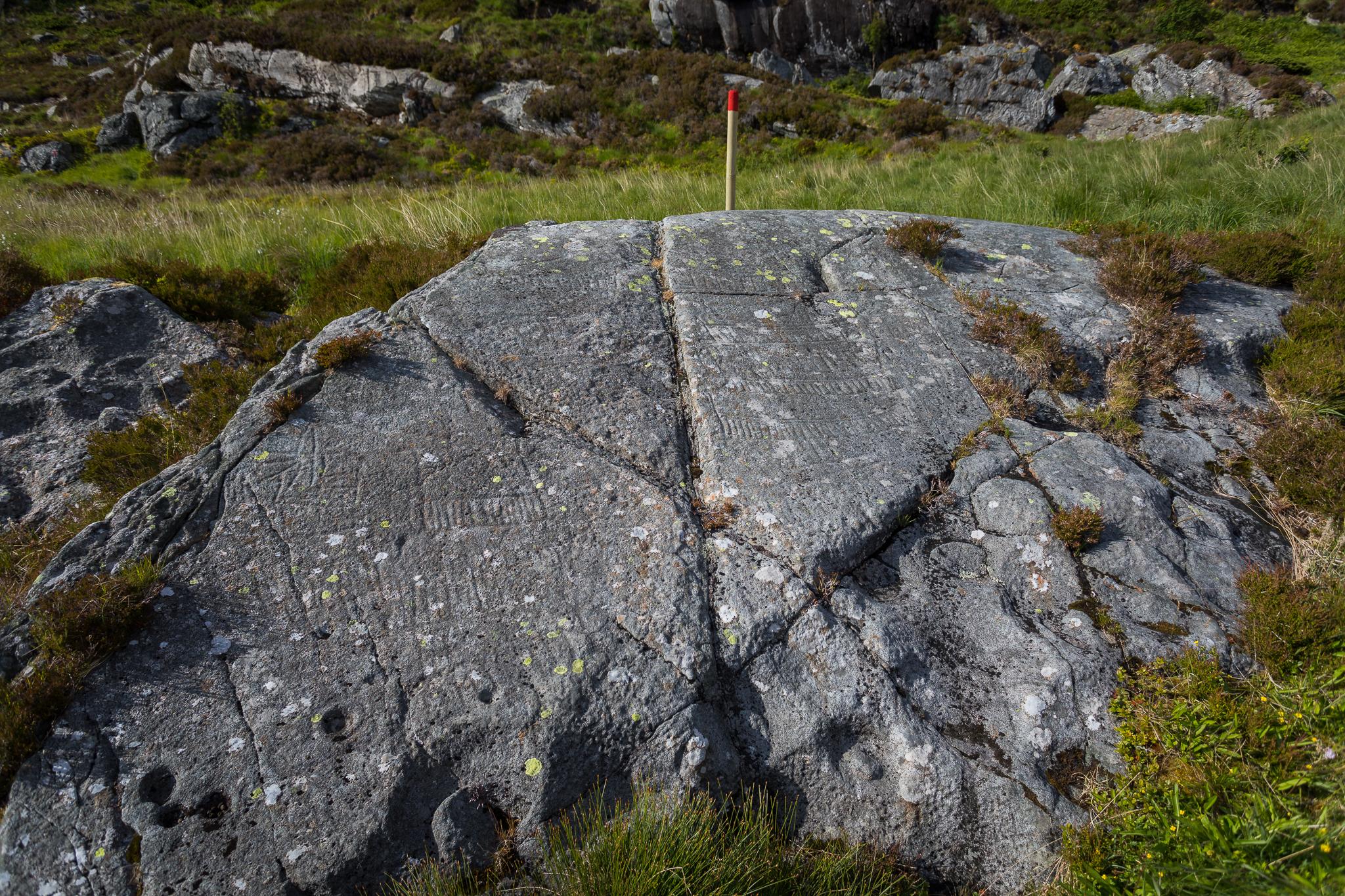
Rock carvings at Færeldemyra on Husevågøy

== See also ==
- List of islands of Norway
