= Trollholet =

Protected coastal cave and archaeological site in Norway

- Trollehola, Trollhola (Norwegian)
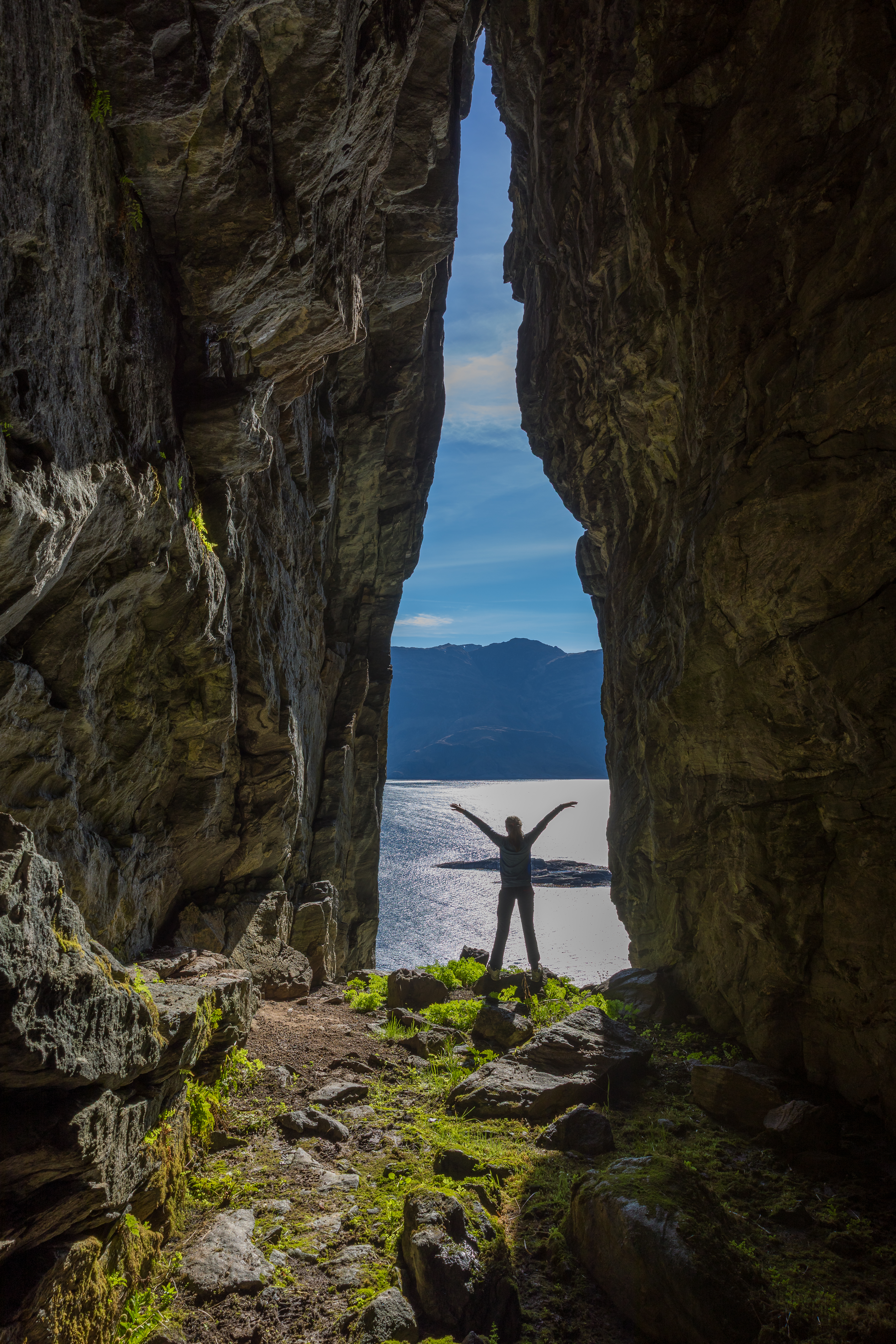
- Interior view of Trollholet on Husevågøy

- Location in Vestland, Norway Trollholet (Norway)
- 61.91479071°N 5.01233002°E
- Type: Coastal cave and archaeological site
- Location: Husevågøy, Kinn Municipality, Vestland, Norway

Designations
- Designation: Automatically protected archaeological heritage site in Norway
- Cultural heritage ID 6086

Trollholet, also known as Trollehola or Trollhola, is a coastal cave on the north-western side of Husevågøy in Kinn Municipality, Vestland county, Norway. The cave is registered in the Norwegian cultural heritage database Kulturminnesøk, operated by the Norwegian Directorate for Cultural Heritage, as an automatically protected archaeological heritage site with cultural heritage ID 6086.

The site is classified as a settlement and activity area. Kulturminnesøk lists the locality under the farm name Husevåg in Kinn Municipality and dates it to the pre-Reformation period.

== Cultural heritage ==
A test excavation in 1924 identified cultural deposits in the cave. The Kulturminnesøk registration describes Trollholet as a damp cave with earth deposits on the floor and a smaller opening at the back leading into a narrow inner chamber.

The cave is described as about 30 metres deep, 15–20 metres high and 4–5 metres wide.

== Access ==
Trollholet lies along a marked hiking route from Husevåg on Husevågøy. UT.no describes the route to Trollehola as a walk that also passes the rock art site at Færeldemyra.

== See also ==
- Husevågøy
- Cave
