= Istrehågan =

Archaeological site in Norway

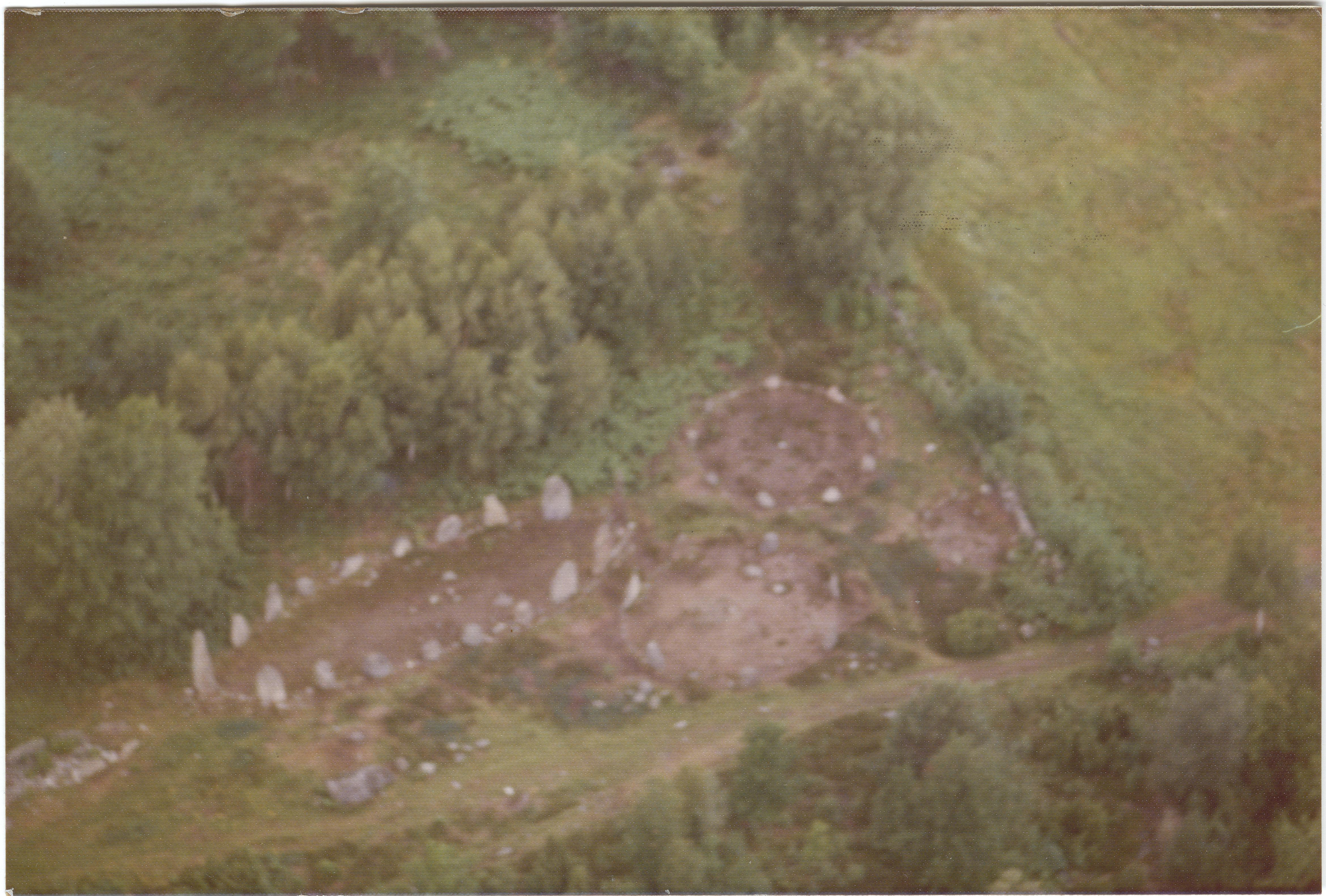
Rock setting resembling a ship.

Istrehågan is an ancient monument at Jåberg on the border of Sandefjord Municipality and Larvik Municipality in Vestfold, Norway. It is home to some of the largest stone settings in the Nordic countries. Nearby Haugen farm in Sandefjord is home to Vestfold County's largest petroglyph site. The rock carvings at Haugen farm are Vestfold County's oldest ancient monument. It is an ancient burial ground which dates to the time of the Roman Iron Age around 500 - 600 AD. It is located two kilometers northwest of Hemskilen Nature Preserve in a forest known as Marumskogen.

Large stone settings resemble a ship. The largest "ship" is 24 metres (79 ft) long, and 9 metres (30 ft) meters broad. Most rocks are about 1 metre (3 ft 3 in) tall, while some are as high as 4.5 metres (15 ft). Archaeological excavations made in 1959-1961 uncovered remains of bones, bear claws, pottery shards, a brooch, and more. Most stone settings are dated to the Migration Period around 400-500 A.D. There are marked hiking trails leading to Istrehågan through the Marum forest, for example from Store Bergan skole. There are also agricultural symbols here which were etched into the hillside during the Bronze Age, 1500-500 B.C.E.

== Stone settings ==
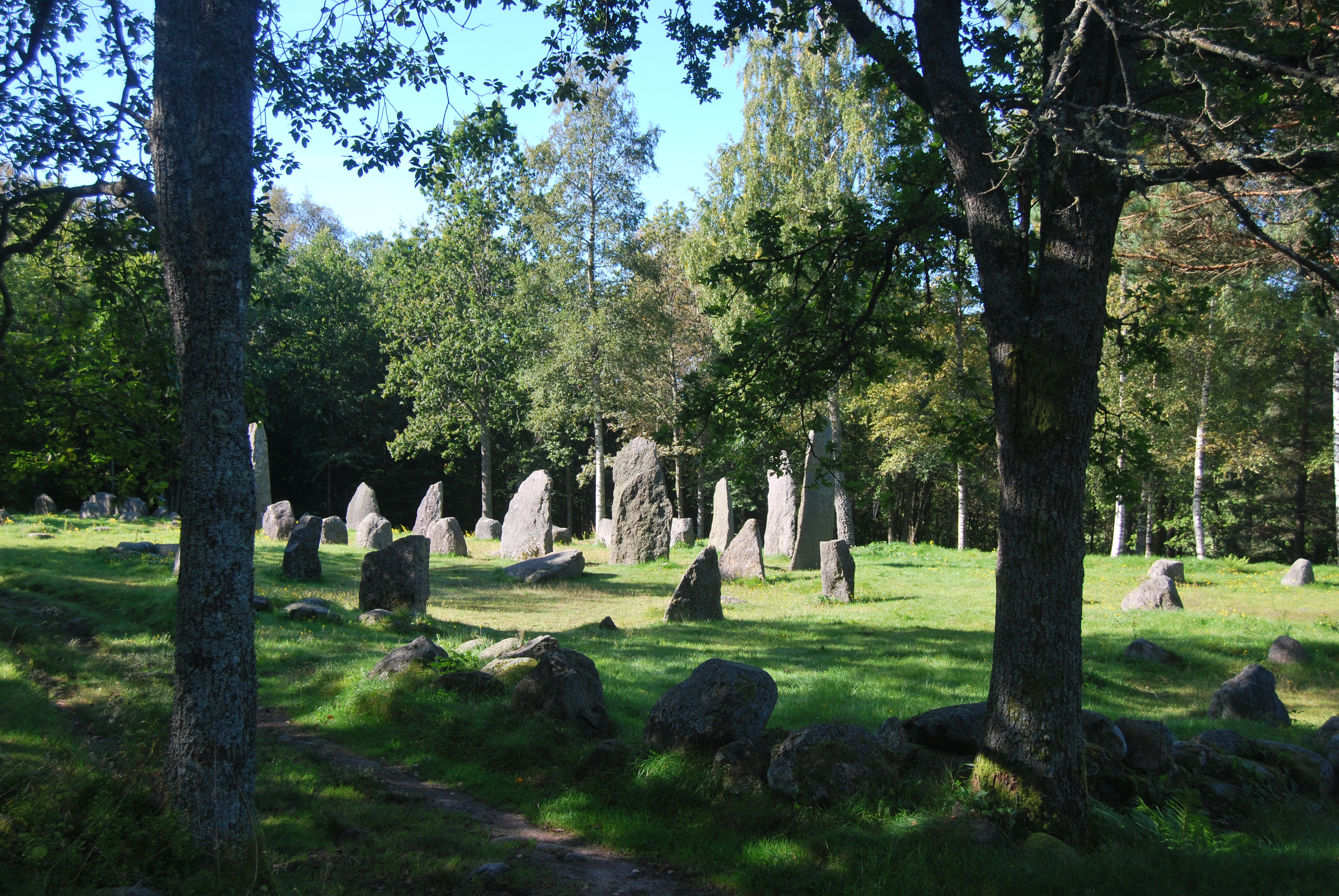
Istrehågan in Vestfold

There are various stone settings, including settings depicting several ships and circles. The stone settings are dated to 400-500 A.D.

Istrehågan has been named one of the most magnificent stone settings in the Nordic countries. A burial mound with large stone settings was put up here during the Great Migration over 1,500 years ago. The largest stone setting resembles a ship and is 25 meters in length. Some stones are as tall as 4.5 meters. The width is 9 meters. The rolling lines of the gunwales are marked explicitly by the falling height of the rocks towards "midship." It is erected with tall stones at each end marking bow and stern.

Istrehåg's stone settings are similar to the stone settlements on the continent and on the British Isles. It is a protected cultural heritage area which is managed by the Museum of Cultural History at the University of Oslo.

== Rock carvings ==
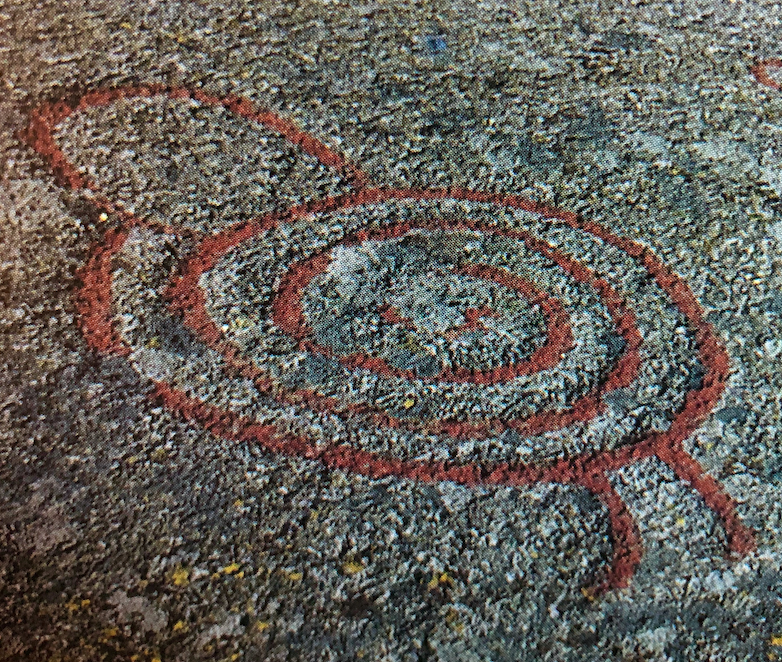
Petroglyphs at nearby Haugen farm are dated to 1500-500 BCE

The rock art at Haugen farm has been described as the most picturesque rock carvings in Vestfold dated to the Bronze Age. On a mountain facing east, 100 meters down the road to Haugen farm, 78 small and large petroglyphs have been discovered. They are located over a 17-meter mountainside. The carvings include 28 ship and ship fragments, including petroglyphs of ships with tall stems, marked railing, and keels. 41 men have been carved onboard the largest ship carving. It also has carvings depicting numerous spiral figures, 37 cup and ring marks, and one circle.

The rock carvings were first described by S.A. Sørensen in his 1872 book Lidt om Sandeherred før i Tiden. It has been described as one of Vestfold’s most valuable ancient monuments. The petroglyphs are located at the Haugen farm, west of Jåberg Station. One group of carvings contain four warriors with round shields. Another group consists of two ships. They are the most visible during lots of daylight. The petroglyphs include 37 ships where railing, hull, and keel are marked.
