= Valdres Line =

Norwegian railway

Coordinates: 60°49′57″N 10°04′21″E

Norwegian: Valdresbanen
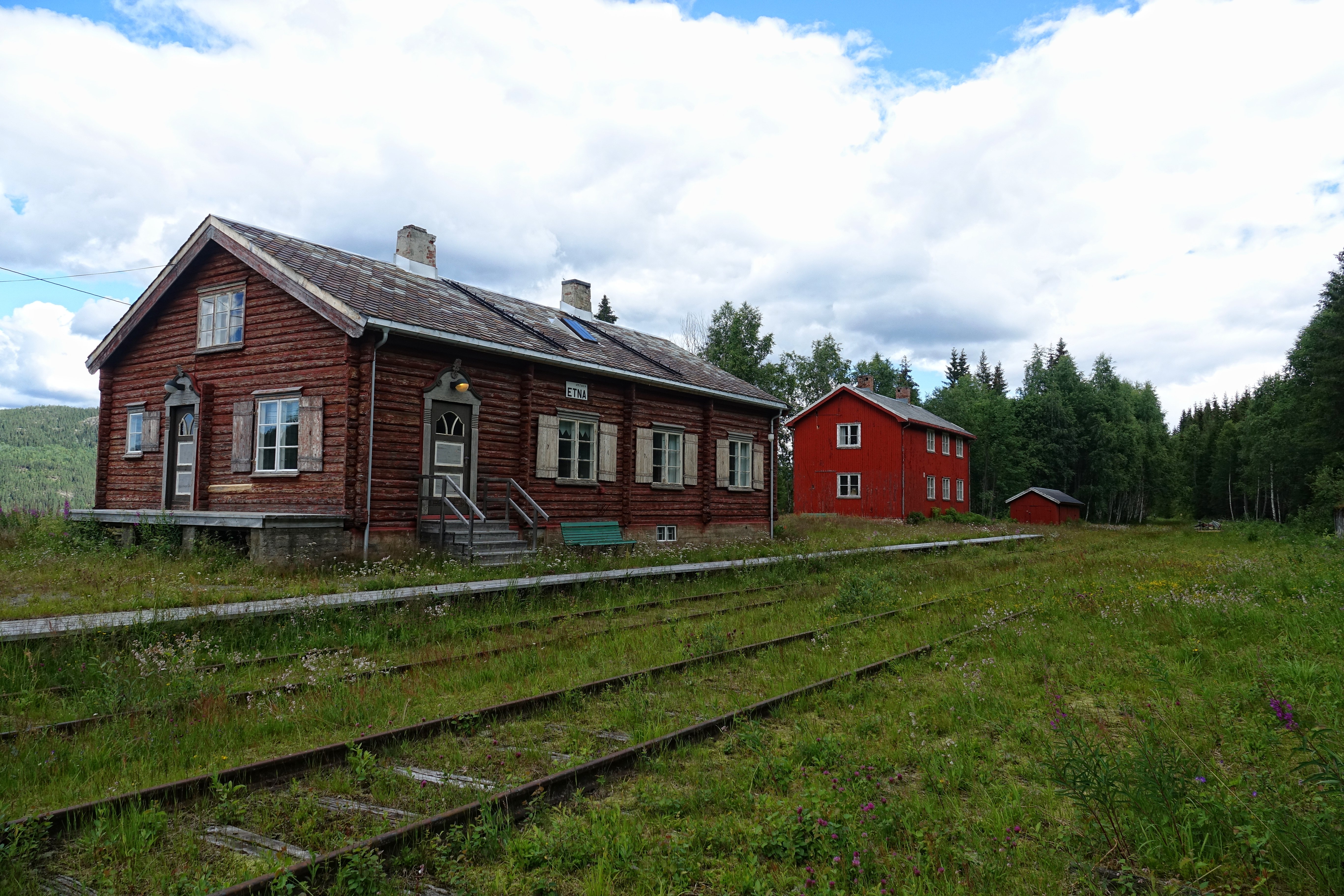
- Now closed Etna Station
- Locale: Norway
- Terminus: Eina; Dokka

Commercial operations
- Built by: Norwegian State Railways
- Original gauge: 1,435 mm (4 ft 8 1/2 in) standard gauge
- Original electrification: None

Preserved operations
- Stations: (?)
- Length: 48 kilometres (30 mi)
- Preserved gauge: 1,435 mm (4 ft 8 1/2 in)

Commercial history
- Opened: 23 November 1902
- Closed: 1 January 1989

The Valdres Line (Norwegian: Valdresbanen) was a Norwegian railway that connected to the Gjøvik Line at Eina with Fagernes in the district of Valdres. The first stretch opened on 23 November 1902, and the entire route was operational on October 10, 1906. The line was shut down for regular traffic as of 1 January 1989.

The entire length of the line was 108 kilometres (67 mi). It connected the rural areas of Land and Valdres by rail to the main railroad network in Norway, including Oslo and international points beyond. Though there is no regular traffic on the line the 48 kilometres (30 mi) stretch from Eina to Dokka is still permitted for trains and considered part of the national rail network.

== History ==
The line was built by a private company, AS Valdresbanen, in four phases:

1. Eina to Dokka (approximately 47 km): regular traffic 28 November 1902
2. Dokka to Tonsåsen (31 km): 1 November 1903
3. Tonsåsen to Aurdal (18 km): 29 September 1906
4. Aurdal to Fagernes (13 km): 29 September 1906

In 1937, the Norwegian government through the Norwegian State Railways took over operations of the line, and in 1953 the line and equipment was modernized to the point that the trip from Oslo to Fagernes took 4.5 hours. In 1955 and 1956 tunnels were built at Høgberget and Tonsåsen, respectively. When Norwegian authorities decided to electrify half of the line distance of Norway in the 1950s and 60s, the Valdres Line was not chosen to be electrified, even though the Gjøvik Line was.

In 1985, a bus service was established between Oslo and Fagernes, reducing the number of annual passengers on the train line by 19,000. In 1988, the Norwegian legislature decided to shut down regular traffic on the Valdres Line while keeping the tracks between Eina and Leira open for purposes of national security. In 1989, a grassroots movement was started to keep the line, but to no avail. In 1991, the tracks between Leira and Fagernes were lifted (removed). A private company is formed to arrange chartered trips on the remaining railway.

Station number	Station name	Distance from						Altitude		Comments
Station number	Station name	Eina		Oslo		Fagernes		Altitude		Comments
Station number	Station name	km	miles	km	miles	km	miles	m	ft	Comments
1621	Eina	–	–	100.89	62.69	108.08	67.16	401.80	1,318.2	Connection with the Gjøvik Line
.	Bridge over Einavann	1.13	0.70	102.02	63.39	106.95	66.46	–	–	Length 21.3 m (70 ft)
.	Ra sidetrack	4.39	2.73	105.28	65.42	103.69	64.43	–	–	/
1700.01	Røste	5.12	3.18	106.01	65.87	102.96	63.98	–	–	established 1969, closed April 14, 1970
1700.02	Vestli	6.2	3.9	107.09	66.54	101.88	63.31	–	–	Closed 1952
1701	Trevatn	8.25	5.13	109.14	67.82	99.83	62.03	385.50	1,264.8	Sp 01/07/59 u 07/01/68, hp/L ca/1970, closed January 1 89
1701.01	Halmrastsæter	10.78	6.70	111.67	69.39	97.30	60.46	–	–	(hp) 01/06/1969, closed 14/04/1970
1702	Skrukli	14.92	9.27	115.81	71.96	93.16	57.89	393.00	1,289.37	U 07/01/68, hp/L 05/08/83, closed January 1, 1989
1702.01	Opperud	18.2	11.3	119.09	74.00	89.88	55.85	–	–	closed 1952
1703	Fall	19.84	12.33	120.73	75.02	88.24	54.83	299.20	981.6	Sp 07/01/68, u 10/06/68 hp/L 09/10/74, hp 15/11/84. Closed January 1, 1989
1703.01	Klinkenberg	21.69	13.48	122.58	76.17	86.39	53.68	–	–	(hp) 01/06/1969, closed 14/04/1970
1704	Hov	23.27	14.46	124.16	77.15	84.81	52.70	233.50	766.1	U/x January 1, 1989
1704.01	Kluke	25.4	15.8	126.29	78.47	82.68	51.37	–	–	closed 1939
1704.02	Gabrielstugua	26.9	16.7	127.79	79.41	81.18	50.44	–	–	(hp) 01/06/1969, closed 14/04/1970
1705	Bjørnerud	28.06	17.44	128.95	80.13	80.02	49.72	175.20	574.8	S 1949, Sp 05/05/1959, hp/L 01/09/1959 hp 14/05/1968, closed January 1, 1989
1705.01	Steinsvoll	30.55	18.98	131.44	81.67	77.53	48.17	–	–	(hp) 01/06/1969, closed 14/04/1970
..	Underpass riksvei 33	31.45	19.54	132.34	82.23	76.63	47.62	–	–	Concrete bridge, length 43.6 m (143 ft)
1706	Fluberg	33.04	20.53	133.93	83.22	75.04	46.63	154.80	507.9	Sp 07/01/1968, u 10/06/1968, hp/L November 1987, closed January 1, 1989
1706.01	Kronborg	36.87	22.91	137.76	85.60	71.21	44.25	–	–	(hp) 01/06/1969, closed 14/04/1970
1707	Odnes	39.31	24.43	140.2	87.1	68.77	42.73	138.60	454.7	Sp 07/01/1968, u 10/06/1968, u/g January 1, 1989, l...//
1707.01	Åvella	42.51	26.41	143.4	89.1	65.57	40.74	–	–	(hp) 01/06/1969, closed 14/04/197
1708	Dokka	47.02	29.22	147.91	91.91	61.06	37.94	148.50	487.2	S/g January 1, 1989
.	Bridge over Dølveita	47.7	29.6	148.59	92.33	60.38	37.52	–	–	length 30 m (98 ft)
.	Bridge over Dokka	48.08	29.88	148.97	92.57	60.00	37.28	–	–	length 60 m (200 ft)
1709	Nordsinni	53.92	33.50	154.81	96.19	54.16	33.65	267.00	875.98	U 07/01/1968, hp 24/11/1971, closed January 1, 1989
.	Håkonstad Tunnel	59.28	36.83	160.17	99.53	48.80	30.32	–	–	length 115 m (377 ft)
1710	Etna	64.96	40.36	165.85	103.05	43.12	26.79	479.70	1,573.8	U 07/01/1968, hp November 1987, closed January 1, 1989
.	Høgberget Tunnel	71.95	44.71	172.84	107.40	36.13	22.45	–	–	length 784 m (2,572 ft)
1711	Tonsåsen	77.48	48.14	178.37	110.83	30.60	19.01	682.00	2,237.53	U 01/08/1984, l January 1, 1989
1712	Bjørgo	90.07	55.97	190.96	118.66	18.01	11.19	510.00	1,673.23	Sp 07/01/1968, closed January 1, 1989
1713	Aurdal	95.31	59.22	196.2	121.9	12.77	7.93	457.40	1,500.7	Sp 07/01/1968, u January 1, 1983, hp November 1987, closed January 1, 1989
1714	Leira	104.08	64.67	204.97	127.36	4.00	2.49	372.00	1,220.47	Sp 07/01/1968, u 10/06/1968, closed January 1, 1989
.	Fagernes Tunnel	105.95	65.83	206.84	128.52	2.13	1.32	–	–	Length 80 m (260 ft), demolished fall of 1991
1715	Fagernes	108.08	67.16	208.97	129.85	–	–	360.00	1,181.10	closed/ January 1, 1989
