= Torpa Municipality =

Former municipality in Oppland, Norway

Torpa Municipality Torpa herred
- Former municipality
- Torpen herred (historic name)
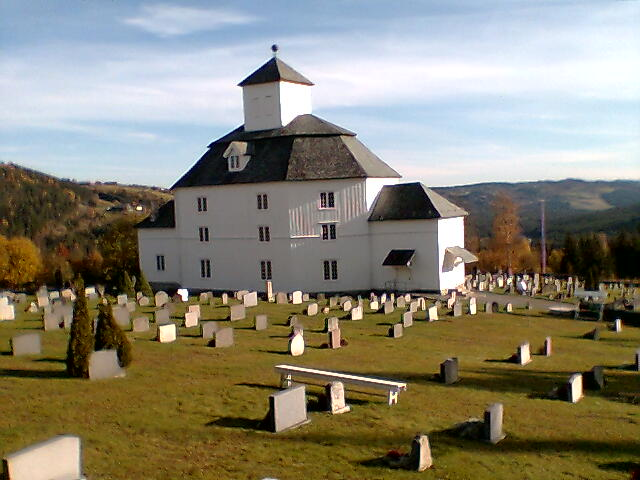
- Åmot Church in northern Torpa

- Oppland within Norway

- Torpa within Oppland
- Coordinates: 60°59′23″N 10°03′51″E
- Country: Norway
- County: Oppland
- District: Land
- Established: 1 Jan 1914
  - Preceded by: Nordre Land
- Disestablished: 1 Jan 1962
  - Succeeded by: Nordre Land
- Administrative centre: Åmot

Government
  - Mayor (1960-1961): Nils Herman Sundby (Ap)

Area (upon dissolution)
  - Total: 561.4 km^{2} (216.8 sq mi)
  - Rank: #174 in Norway
- Highest elevation: 1,414.39 m (4,640.4 ft)

Population (1961)
  - Total: 2,662
  - Rank: #346 in Norway
  - Density: 4.7/km^{2} (12/sq mi)
  - Change (10 years): ▼ −4.7%
- Demonym: Torping

Official language
  - Norwegian form: Neutral
- Time zone: UTC+01:00 (CET)
  - Summer (DST): UTC+02:00 (CEST)
- ISO 3166 code: NO-0539

Torpa (or historically Torpen) is a former municipality in the old Oppland county, Norway. The 561.4-square-kilometre (216.8 sq mi) municipality existed from 1914 until its dissolution in 1962. The area is now part of Nordre Land Municipality in the traditional district of Land. The administrative centre was the village at Åmot where the Åmot Church is located.

Prior to its dissolution in 1962, the 561.4-square-kilometre (216.8 sq mi) municipality was the 174th largest by area out of the 731 municipalities in Norway. Torpa Municipality was the 346th most populous municipality in Norway with a population of about 2,662. The municipality's population density was 4.7 inhabitants per square kilometre (12/sq mi) and its population had decreased by 4.7% over the previous 10-year period.

== General information ==
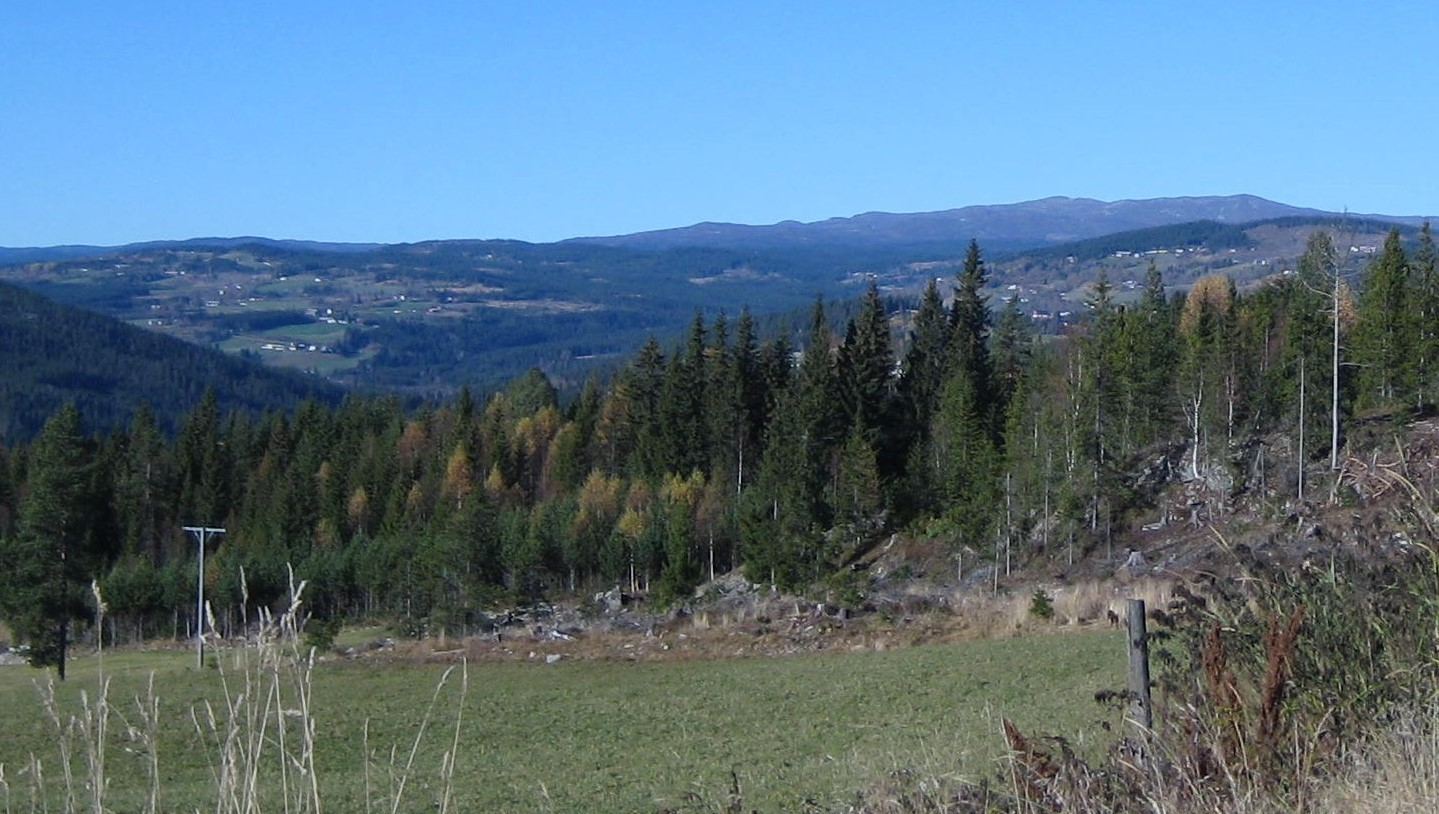
View of northern Torpa

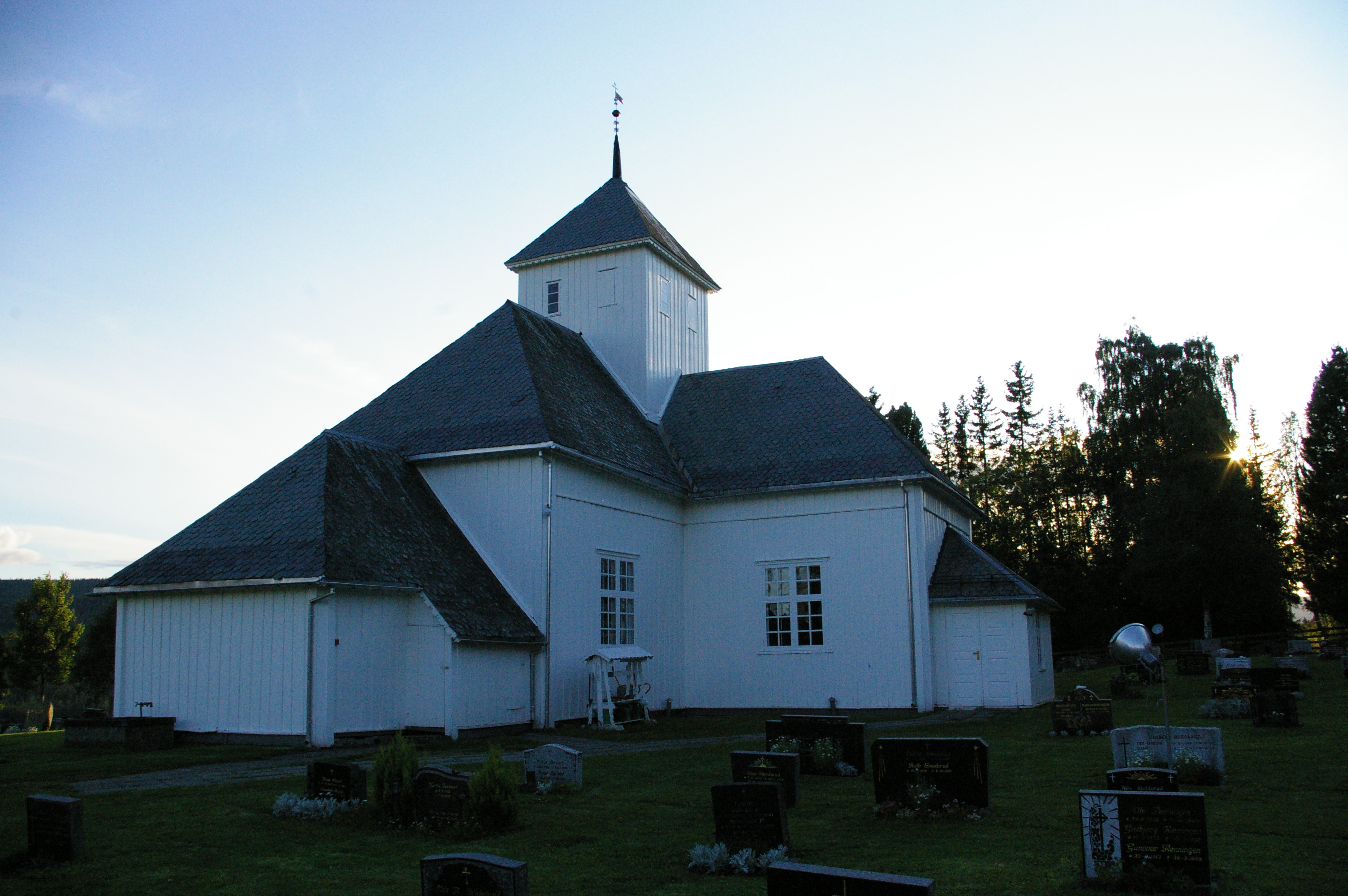
Lunde Church in western Torpa

The municipality of Torpen (later spelled Torpa) was established on 1 January 1914 when the large Nordre Land Municipality was divided into two: Torpen Municipality (population: 2,219) in the north and Nordre Land Municipality (population: 2,570) in the south. In 1918, the spelling of the name was changed from Torpen Municipality to Torpa Municipality. During the 1960s, there were many municipal mergers across Norway due to the work of the Schei Committee. On 1 January 1962, Torpa Municipality (population: 2,620) was merged with the neighboring Nordre Land Municipality (population: 3,870) and the Tranlia and Store Røen areas (population: 196) of the neighboring Fluberg Municipality creating a new, larger Nordre Land Municipality.

=== Name ===
The municipality (originally the parish) is named, Torpen (Old Norse: Þorp) since it is the old name for the area. The name is identical with the word þorp which means "hamlet" or "village". Historically, the name of the municipality was spelled Torpen. On 3 November 1917, a royal resolution changed the spelling of the name of the municipality to Torpa, removing the definite form ending -en.

=== Churches ===
The Church of Norway had one parish (sokn) within Torpa Municipality. At the time of the municipal dissolution, it was part of the Nordre Land prestegjeld and the Hadeland og Land prosti (deanery) in the Diocese of Hamar.

Churches in Torpa Municipality
Parish (sokn)	Church name	Location of the church	Year built
Torpa	Kinn Church	Aust-Torpa	1956
Torpa	Åmot Church	Fagerlund	1823
Torpa	Lunde Church	Lunde	1769

== Geography ==
Torpa made up the northern part of the traditional district of Land. Etnedal Municipality and Nord-Aurdal Municipality were located to the west, Vestre Gausdal Municipality was to the north, Fåberg Municipality was located to the east, Snertingdal Municipality was to the southeast, and Nordre Land Municipality was to the south. The highest point in the municipality was the 1,414.39-metre (4,640.4 ft) tall mountain Spåtind along the western border with Etnedal Municipality.

== Government ==
While it existed, Torpa Municipality was responsible for primary education (through 10th grade), outpatient health services, senior citizen services, welfare and other social services, zoning, economic development, and municipal roads and utilities. The municipality was governed by a municipal council of directly elected representatives. The mayor was indirectly elected by a vote of the municipal council. The municipality was under the jurisdiction of the Eidsivating Court of Appeal.

=== Municipal council ===
The municipal council (Herredsstyre) of Torpa Municipality was made up of representatives that were elected to four year terms. The tables below show the historical composition of the council by political party.

Torpa herredsstyre 1959–1961
Party name (in Norwegian)	Number of representatives
Labour Party (Arbeiderpartiet)	12
Christian Democratic Party (Kristelig Folkeparti)	1
Centre Party (Senterpartiet)	2
Liberal Party (Venstre)	2
Total number of members:	17
Note: On 1 January 1962, Torpa Municipality became part of Nordre Land Municipality.

Torpa herredsstyre 1955–1959
Party name (in Norwegian)	Number of representatives
Labour Party (Arbeiderpartiet)	11
Christian Democratic Party (Kristelig Folkeparti)	1
Farmers' Party (Bondepartiet)	3
Liberal Party (Venstre)	1
List of workers, fishermen, and small farmholders (Arbeidere, fiskere, småbrukere liste)	1
Total number of members:	17

Torpa herredsstyre 1951–1955
Party name (in Norwegian)	Number of representatives
Labour Party (Arbeiderpartiet)	10
Christian Democratic Party (Kristelig Folkeparti)	2
Farmers' Party (Bondepartiet)	3
Liberal Party (Venstre)	1
Total number of members:	16

Torpa herredsstyre 1947–1951
Party name (in Norwegian)	Number of representatives
Labour Party (Arbeiderpartiet)	9
Communist Party (Kommunistiske Parti)	1
Farmers' Party (Bondepartiet)	3
Joint list of the Liberal Party (Venstre) and the Radical People's Party (Radikale Folkepartiet)	3
Total number of members:	16

Torpa herredsstyre 1945–1947
Party name (in Norwegian)	Number of representatives
Labour Party (Arbeiderpartiet)	10
Farmers' Party (Bondepartiet)	3
Joint list of the Liberal Party (Venstre) and the Radical People's Party (Radikale Folkepartiet)	3
Total number of members:	16

Torpa herredsstyre 1937–1941*
Party name (in Norwegian)	Number of representatives
Labour Party (Arbeiderpartiet)	7
Nasjonal Samling Party (Nasjonal Samling)	2
Farmers' Party (Bondepartiet)	5
Joint list of the Liberal Party (Venstre) and the Radical People's Party (Radikale Folkepartiet)	2
Total number of members:	16
Note: Due to the German occupation of Norway during World War II, no elections were held for new municipal councils until after the war ended in 1945.

=== Mayors ===
The mayor (Norwegian: ordfører) of Torpa Municipality was the political leader of the municipality and the chairperson of the municipal council. The following people have held this position:

- 1914–1922: Nils Eng
- 1923–1925: Christian C. Jøranli
- 1926–1928: Amund Stadsvoll
- 1929–1931: Kristian Stadsvoll
- 1932–1934: Birger Snilsberg (Bp)
- 1935–1937: Arve Frøisland (NS)
- 1938–1940: Birger Snilsberg (Bp)
- 1941–1945: Kristian Erstad (NS)
- 1945–1946: Birger Snilsberg (Bp)
- 1946–1951: Amund Ødegård (Ap)
- 1952–1959: Arne Sandbakken (Ap)
- 1960–1961: Nils Herman Sundby (Ap)

== See also ==
- List of former municipalities of Norway
