= Dokka (disambiguation) =

Dokka may refer to:

== People ==
- Dokka Manikya Vara Prasad (born 1962), an Indian politician
- Dokka Seethamma (1841–1909), an Indian woman who gained recognition by spending much of her life serving food for poor people and travellers
- Dokka Umarov (1964–2013), a Chechen mujahid
- Johan Dokka (1881–1972), a Norwegian politician
- Karen Dokka (born 1947), a Canadian former alpine skier who competed in the 1964 Winter Olympics and in the 1968 Winter Olympics

== Places ==
- Dokka, a village in Nordre Land municipality in Innlandet county, Norway
- Dokka Station, a former railway station in Nordre Land municipality in Innlandet county, Norway

== Other ==
- Dokka language, an Afro-Asiatic language spoken in Ethiopia
- Ekka Dokka, a drama show that premiered on Bengali general entertainment channel Star Jalsha in 2022
