= Nordre Land IL =

Norwegian sports club

- Full name: Nordre Land Idrettslag
- Founded: 1912
- Ground: Dokka stadion, Dokka
- League: Fourth Division
Home colours	Away colours

Nordre Land Idrettslag is a Norwegian sports club from the village of Dokka in Nordre Land Municipality in Innlandet county. It has sections for association football, team handball, Nordic skiing, biathlon, cycling, equestrianism, swimming, judo, gymnastics, and track and field. It was founded in 1912.

The men's football team plays in the Fourth Division, the fourth tier of Norwegian football. It had a spell in the 3. divisjon running from 2008 to 2013.

== List of known people ==
- Rune Brattsveen, biathlete
- Hans Vinjarengen, skier (deceased)
- Ole Kolterud, skier (deceased)
- Sverre Kolterud, skier (deceased)
- Joachim Sørum, footballer
- Olav Dalen, footballer
