= Åmot Church (Nordre Land) =

Church in Innlandet, Norway

- Åmot kirke
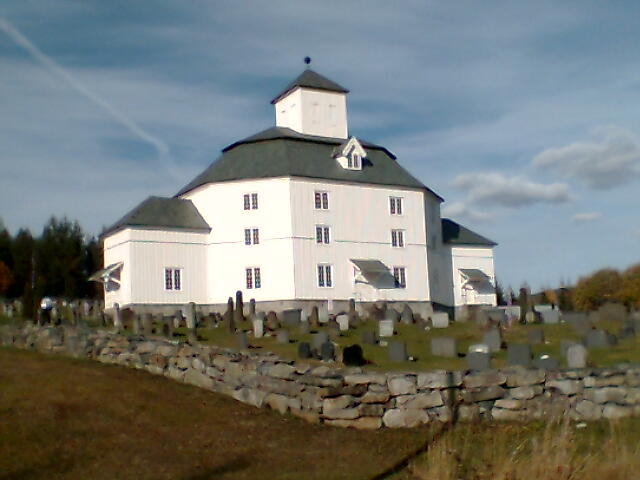
- View of the church
- Åmot Church
- 60°59′49″N 10°02′51″E
- Location: Nordre Land, Innlandet
- Country: Norway
- Denomination: Church of Norway
- Churchmanship: Evangelical Lutheran

History
- Status: Parish church
- Founded: 1823
- Consecrated: 1823

Architecture
- Functional status: Active
- Architect: Abraham Pihl
- Architectural type: Octagonal
- Completed: 1823 (203 years ago)

Specifications
- Capacity: 700
- Materials: Wood

Administration
- Diocese: Hamar bispedømme
- Deanery: Hadeland og Land prosti
- Parish: Torpa
- Norwegian Cultural Heritage Site
- Type: Church
- Status: Automatically protected
- ID: 85968

Åmot Church (Norwegian: Åmot kirke) is a parish church of the Church of Norway in Nordre Land Municipality in Innlandet county, Norway. It is located in the village of Fagerlund. It is one of the churches for the Torpa parish which is part of the Hadeland og Land prosti (deanery) in the Diocese of Hamar. The white, wooden church was built in a octagonal design in 1823 using plans drawn up by the architect Abraham Pihl. The church seats about 700 people.

== History ==
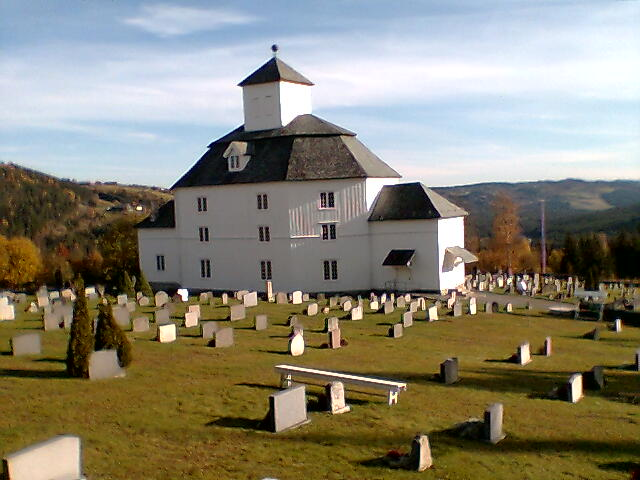
View of the church

Historically, people in the Torpa and Dokka areas had several churches scattered over the fairly rural parts of Nordre Land. In 1817, plans were made to build a new church at Fagerlund, in northern Torpa. The new church was to be built in a more central location and it was going to be a large church to accommodate all the local people (which is why it is surprisingly large--seating 700 people--despite being located in a fairly rural area). After the new church was completed, the plan called for demolishing the old Kinn Church in eastern Torpa and the old Lunde Church in western Torpa. This would essentially close two churches and open one new, larger church. Kinn Church was torn down, but Lunde Church was not, but it was no longer maintained and the parish only held services there twice a year.

Abraham Pihl was hired to design the new wooden octagonal building which was modeled off the nearby Vang Church near Hamar. Svend Aspaas was the lead builder. The new church was named Åmot Church and it was built in 1823 and consecrated the same year. The church has a large main floor with lots of seating plus second and third floor balconies with more seating. The new church became the main church for Torpa. In the end, Lunde Church was fixed up and remained in use and then in 1956, a new Kinn Church was built to replace the one that was torn down in 1823.

== See also ==
- List of churches in Hamar
