= Akksjøen =

Lake in Innlandet, Norway

- Interactive map of Akksjøen
- Location: Nordre Land Municipality, Innlandet
- Coordinates: 60°47′4″N 9°55′34″E
- Basin countries: Norway
- Max. length: 5 kilometres (3.1 mi)
- Max. width: 1 kilometre (0.62 mi)
- Surface area: 3.99 km^{2} (1.54 sq mi)
- Shore length^{1}: 15.8 kilometres (9.8 mi)
- Surface elevation: 604 metres (1,982 ft)
- References: NVE
- ^{1} Shore length is not a well-defined measure.

Akksjøen is a lake in Nordre Land Municipality in Innlandet county, Norway. The 3.99-square-kilometre (1.54 sq mi) lake lies in the southwest part of the municipality, about 8 kilometres (5.0 mi) to the southwest of the village of Dokka and about 5 kilometres (3.1 mi) to the south of the village of Nordsinni. The lake is 5 kilometres (3.1 mi) in length and around 1 kilometre (0.62 mi) in width. It has a surface area of about 4 square kilometres (1.5 sq mi).

== See also ==
- List of lakes in Norway
