= Ole Kolterud =

Norwegian Nordic combined skier

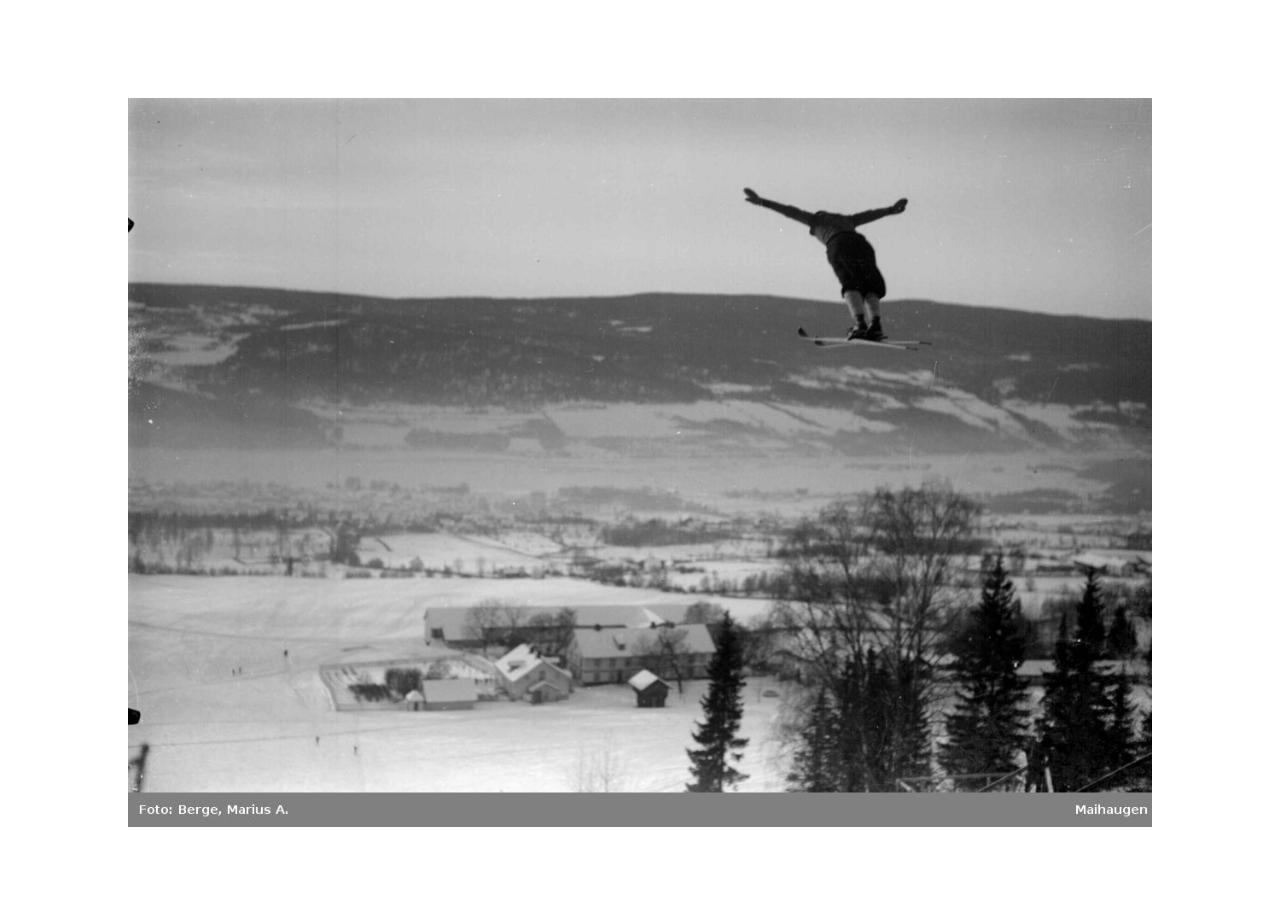
- Kolterud in 1928.
- Born: 1 May 1903; Nordre Land, Norway
- Died: 6 December 1974 (aged 71)
- Relatives: Sverre Kolterud (brother)

Ole Kolterud (1 May 1903, Nordre Land – 6 December 1974) was a Norwegian skier.

He competed at the 1928 Winter Olympics in St. Moritz, where he placed 8th in the Nordic combined.

He was a brother of Sverre Kolterud. He represented the club Nordre Land IL.
