= Sverre Kolterud =

Norwegian Nordic combined skier

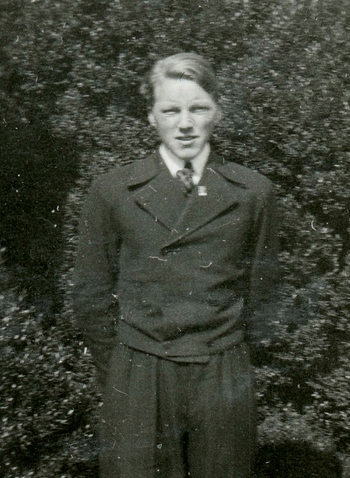

Personal information
- Full name: Sverre Kolterud
- Born: March 15, 1908 Nordre Land, Norway
- Died: 7 November 1996 (aged 88) Oslo, Norway

Sport
- Sport: Skiing
- Club: Nordre Land IL

Sverre Kolterud
Medal record

Men's Nordic combined

World Championships
Silver medal – second place	1931 Oberhof	Individual
Silver medal – second place	1934 Sollefteå	Individual

Sverre Cristiansen Kolterud (March 15, 1908 – November 7, 1996) was a Norwegian Nordic combined skier who competed in the 1930s.

He was born in the village of Dokka in Nordre Land Municipality and died in Oslo.

Kolterud won two silver medals in the individual event at the FIS Nordic World Ski Championships (1931, 1934).

At the 1932 Winter Olympics in Lake Placid, New York, he finished fourth in the individual event.
