= Joachim Sørum =

Norwegian footballer (born 1979)

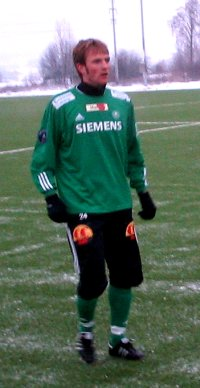

Personal information
- Full name: Joachim Sørum
- Date of birth: 11 February 1979 (age 47)
- Place of birth: Dokka, Norway
- Height: 1.86 m (6 ft 1 in)
- Position: Defender

Team information
- Current team: Nordre Land

Senior career*
Years	Team	Apps	(Gls)
- Nordre Land
- Faaberg
–2001	Lillehammer		
2002–2009	Ham Kam	135	(4)
2008	→ Nybergsund (loan)	12	(0)
2009–2010	Nybergsund	4	(0)
2011–present	Nordre Land		
- * Club domestic league appearances and goals as of 12 October 2008

Joachim Sørum (born 11 February 1979) is a Norwegian footballer.

== Career ==
Born in Dokka, Sørum is a defender, and normally plays in the mid-defence.

He started his career in Nordre Land, and went on to Faaberg which changed its name to Lillehammer. He went to Hamarkameratene ahead of the 2002 season. He made his debut against Tromsdalen on 21 April the same year. The highlight of his career is probably his 2–0 goal in the home match against Rosenborg in 2004. He was loaned out to Nybergsund in 2008, and played there regularly in 2009 and 2010 after spending the pre-season training period in Hamarkameratene. In 2011, he returned home to Nordre Land.
