= Lunde Church (Innlandet) =

Church in Innlandet, Norway

- Lunde kirke
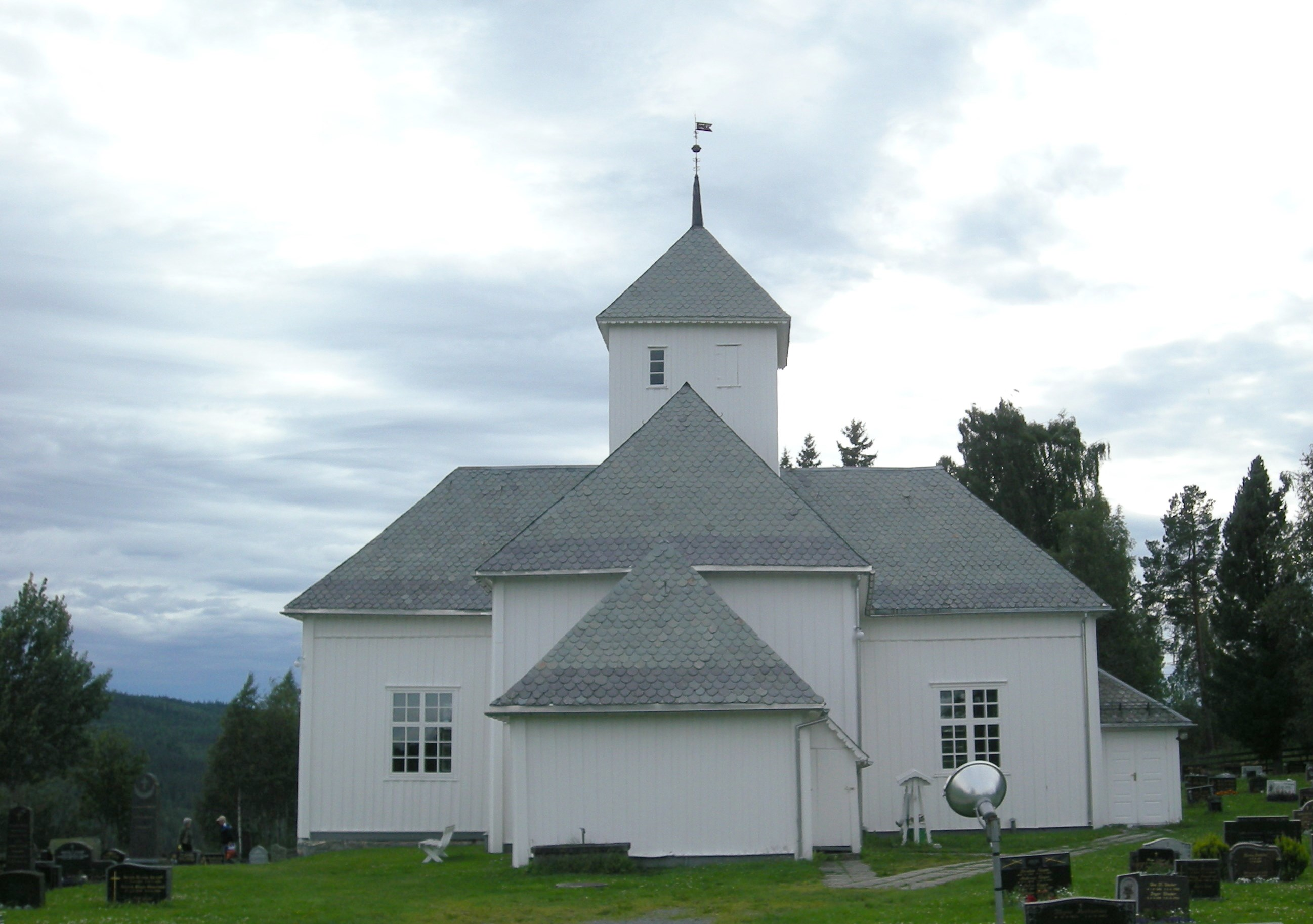
- View of the church
- Lunde Church
- 60°55′54″N 10°02′35″E
- Location: Nordre Land, Innlandet
- Country: Norway
- Denomination: Church of Norway
- Previous denomination: Catholic Church
- Churchmanship: Evangelical Lutheran

History
- Former name(s): Ulensaker kirke Gaarder kirke
- Status: Parish church
- Founded: 13th century
- Consecrated: 23 August 1769

Architecture
- Functional status: Active
- Architectural type: Cruciform
- Completed: 1769 (257 years ago)
- Closed: c. 1500-1630

Specifications
- Capacity: 257
- Materials: Wood

Administration
- Diocese: Hamar bispedømme
- Deanery: Hadeland og Land prosti
- Parish: Lunde
- Norwegian Cultural Heritage Site
- Type: Church
- Status: Automatically protected
- ID: 84333

Lunde Church (Norwegian: Lunde kirke) is a parish church of the Church of Norway in Nordre Land Municipality in Innlandet county, Norway. It is located in the village of Lunde. It is the church for the Lunde parish which is part of the Hadeland og Land prosti (deanery) in the Diocese of Hamar. The white, wooden church was built in a cruciform design in 1769 using plans drawn up by an unknown architect. The church seats about 257 people.

== History ==
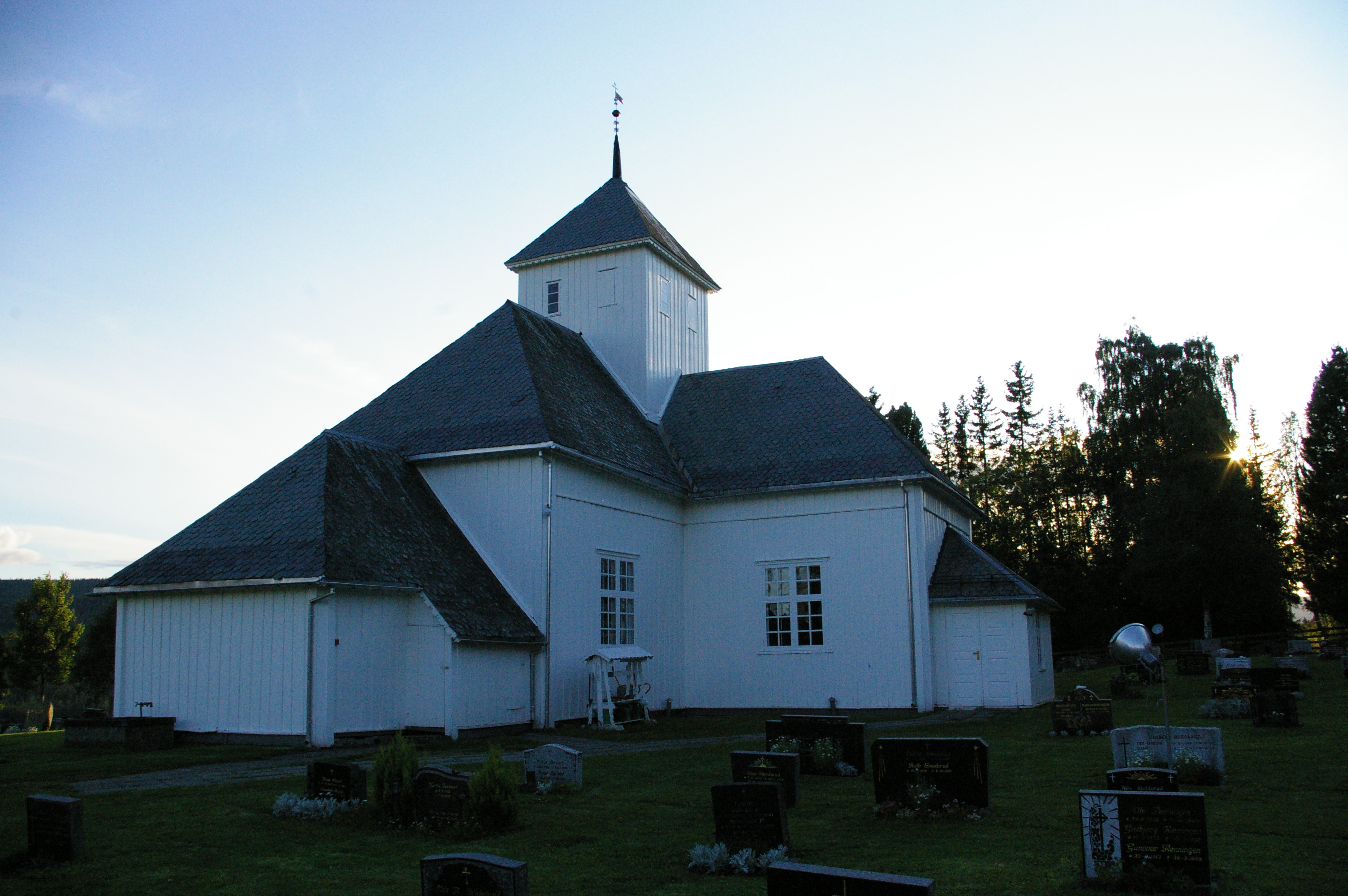
View of the church

The earliest existing historical records of the church date back to the year 1337, but the church was not built that year. The first church in western Torpa was a wooden stave church that was likely built during the 13th century. This church was located at Ulensaker, about 4 kilometres (2.5 mi) north of the present church site. The old church was closed and torn down between the years 1480 and 1594. Around 1630, some local people in western Torpa built a small church at Gaarder, about 2 kilometres (1.2 mi) southeast of the present church site. This church was built by donations and volunteers. It was a wooden long church that measured about 14 by 7 metres (46 ft × 23 ft). By the 1760s, the small church was quite dilapidated and in need of replacement.

Planning for a new church began, but the local parish priest, Niels Dorph, wanted the church in Gaarder torn down in favor of the nearby Kinn Church, which he wanted to be the sole church for the Torpa area. He was overruled and the old church was torn down and a new church was built at Lunde, about 2 kilometres (1.2 mi) to the northwest. The new site was chosen because it had better soil as the ground in Gaarder was not suitable for a cemetery. Land for the new church was donated by Stener Gudbrandsen Lunde. The new church was a cruciform church with a hipped roof and a tower in the centre. The new church was consecrated on 23 August 1769.

By the 1820s, the parish decided to build the new Åmot Church and to use it as the main church for the parish. In connection with this, they would close and tear down the old Kinn Church because it was in poor condition and to do the same to the Lunde Church because the local residents could no longer afford to maintain it. The local residents did not want to lose their church, so they made a deal that the parish would hold one worship service in the summer and another in the winter at Lunde each year for as long as the church lasted. The building remained in surprisingly good shape for the next few decades, and after the service on 22 March 1846, a meeting was held among the local farmers. At that time, 693 people attended Lunde Church (1/3 of Torpa's population) and the farmers agreed to resume maintenance of the church, as well as to apply for more worship services. On 24 May 1848, a royal resolution was approved that granted six services a year at Lunde. In 1872, the municipality took over the maintenance and funding of the church. In the summer of 1954, Lunde Church was made to be its own parish.

== See also ==
- List of churches in Hamar
