= Kjetil Bjørklund =

Norwegian politician

Kjetil Bjørklund (born 18 March 1967) is a Norwegian politician for the Socialist Left Party.

He was elected to the Norwegian Parliament from Oppland in 2001, but was not re-elected in 2005. During the second cabinet Stoltenberg, Bjørklund was appointed political advisor in the Ministry of the Environment, a post he left after three months.

On the local level Bjørklund was a deputy member of the municipal council for Nordre Land Municipality from 1991 to 2003. He chaired the local party chapter from 1999 to 2001.

He has been active in the Norwegian Society for the Conservation of Nature.
