= Dokka Station =

Former railway station in Nordre Land, Norway

Coordinates: 60.8333°N 10.0748°E

Dokka
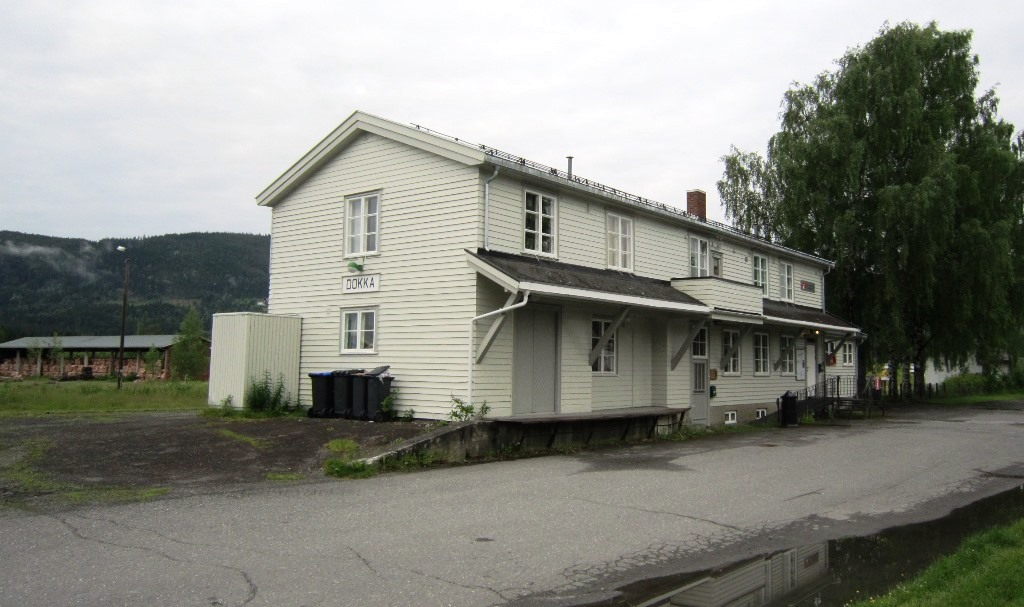
- Dokka station building

General information
- Location: Dokka, Nordre Land Municipality; Norway
- Elevation: 148.5 m (487 ft) AMSL
- Owner: Norwegian State Railways
- Operator: Norwegian State Railways
- Line: Valdres Line
- Distance: 147.91 km (91.91 mi)

History
- Opened: 28 November 1902
Location

Dokka Station (Norwegian: Dokka stasjon) was a railway station on the Valdres Line located in the village of Dokka in Nordre Land Municipality, Norway. The station opened on 28 November 1902 and remained until the line closed on 1 January 1989. It was 147.91 kilometres (91.91 mi) from Oslo Central Station and at an elevation of 148.5 metres (487 ft) above mean sea level. The restaurant was taken over by Norsk Spisevognselskap on 17 January 1922. However, the restaurant was closed on 1 October 1923.

Preceding station		Following station
Odnes	Valdres Line	Nordsinni
