= Vølstad Church =

Church in Innlandet, Norway

- Vølstad kirke
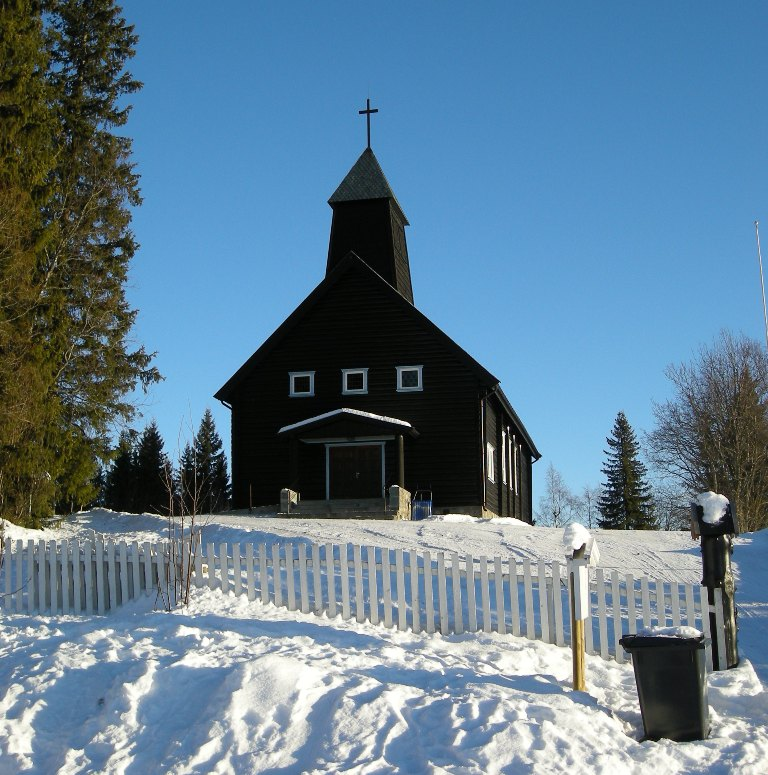
- View of the church
- Vølstad Church
- 60°50′45″N 10°11′03″E
- Location: Nordre Land, Innlandet
- Country: Norway
- Denomination: Church of Norway
- Churchmanship: Evangelical Lutheran

History
- Status: Parish church
- Founded: 1959
- Consecrated: 24 June 1959

Architecture
- Functional status: Active
- Architect: Per Nordan
- Architectural type: Long church
- Completed: 1959 (67 years ago)

Specifications
- Capacity: 140
- Materials: Wood

Administration
- Diocese: Hamar bispedømme
- Deanery: Hadeland og Land prosti
- Parish: Østsinni
- Norwegian Cultural Heritage Site
- Type: Church
- Status: Not protected
- ID: 85877

Vølstad Church (Norwegian: Vølstad kirke) is a parish church of the Church of Norway in Nordre Land Municipality in Innlandet county, Norway. It is located in the village of Vølstad. It is one of the churches for the Østsinni parish which is part of the Hadeland og Land prosti (deanery) in the Diocese of Hamar. The brown, wooden church was built in a long church design in 1959 using plans drawn up by the architect Per Nordan. The church seats about 140 people.

== History ==
During the 1950s, plans were made to build a church in Vølstad. Per Nordan (the grandson of the noted church architect Jacob Wilhelm Nordan) was hired to design the new church. It was a wooden long church that was constructed during 1959. The new church was consecrated on 24 June 1959 (on the Nativity of Saint John the Baptist day).

== See also ==
- List of churches in Hamar
