= Nordsinni Church =

Church in Innlandet, Norway

- Nordsinni kirke
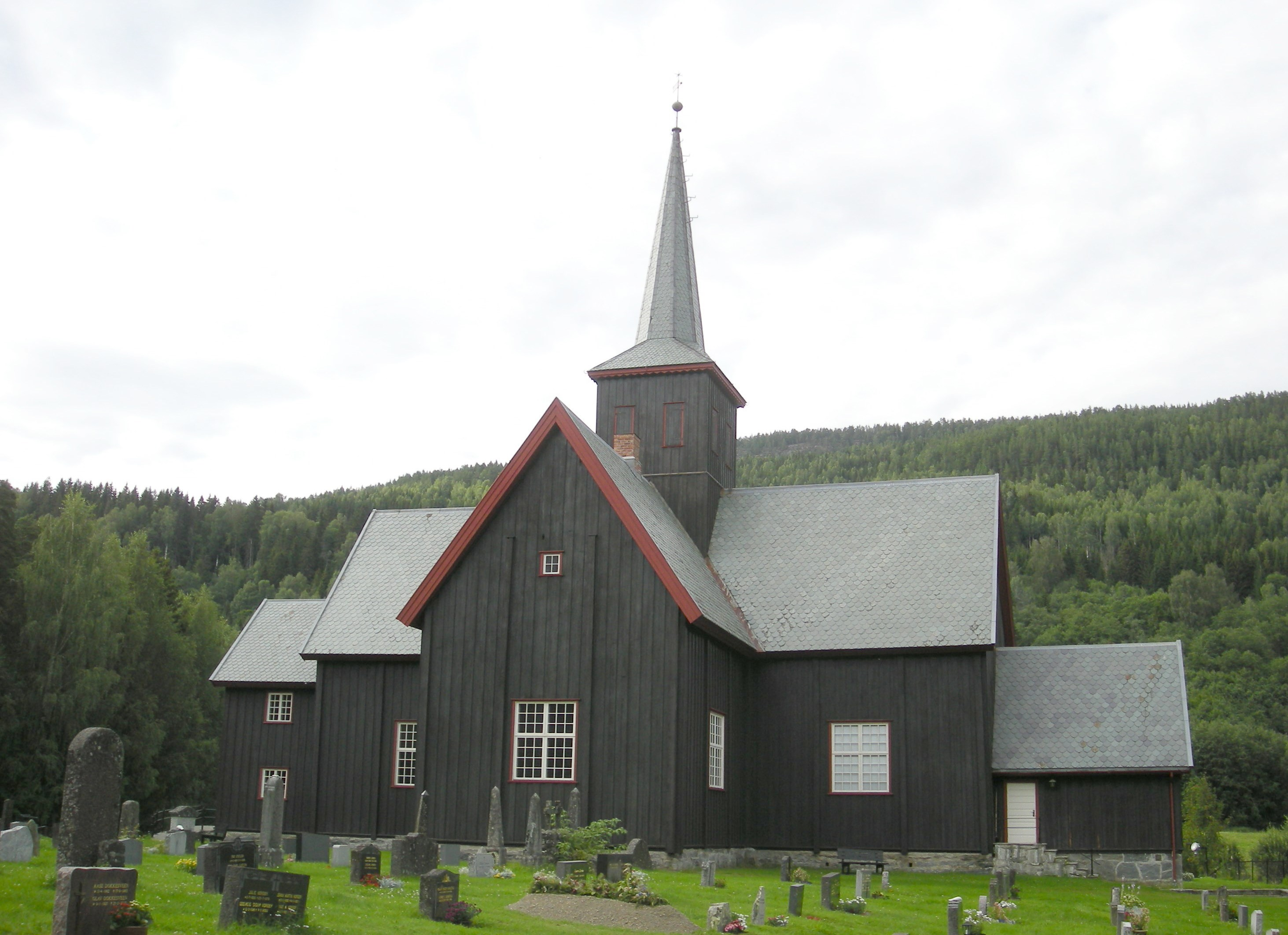
- View of the church
- Nordsinni Church
- 60°50′29″N 9°57′31″E
- Location: Nordre Land, Innlandet
- Country: Norway
- Denomination: Church of Norway
- Previous denomination: Catholic Church
- Churchmanship: Evangelical Lutheran

History
- Status: Parish church
- Founded: 13th century
- Consecrated: 9 November 1898

Architecture
- Functional status: Active
- Architect: Bjarne Hvaslef
- Architectural type: Long church
- Completed: 1758 (268 years ago)

Specifications
- Capacity: 340
- Materials: Wood

Administration
- Diocese: Hamar bispedømme
- Deanery: Hadeland og Land prosti
- Parish: Nordsinni
- Norwegian Cultural Heritage Site
- Type: Church
- Status: Automatically protected
- ID: 85168

Nordsinni Church (Norwegian: Nordsinni kirke) is a parish church of the Church of Norway in Nordre Land Municipality in Innlandet county, Norway. It is located in the village of Nordsinni. It is one of the churches for the Nordsinni parish which is part of the Hadeland og Land prosti (deanery) in the Diocese of Hamar. The brown, wooden church was built in a long church design in 1758 using plans drawn up by the architect Bjarne Hvaslef and it was moved to a new site in 1898. The church seats about 340 people.

== History ==
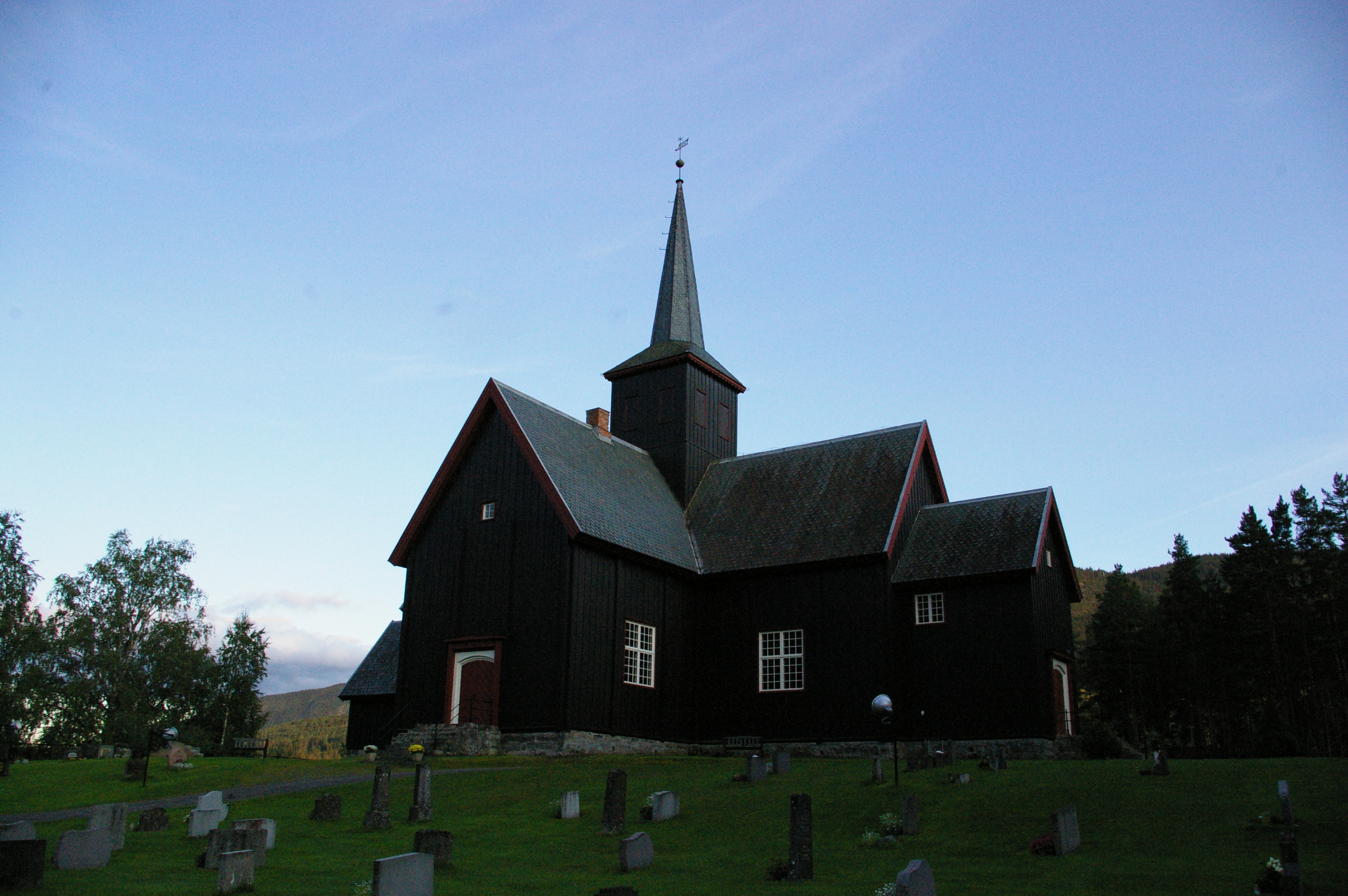
View of the church

The earliest existing historical records of the church date back to the year 1311, but the church was not new that year. The first church in Nordsinni was a wooden stave church that was likely built during the 13th century. This church was built at Haugner (where the present-day Haugner Church is now located). By the 1750s, the church was in very poor condition. In 1755, the old church was torn down and a new church was built from 1755-1758 on the same site. It was a wooden cruciform building with a cross on the centre of the roof. There is a church porch on the west end and a small sacristy on the east end behind the choir. The new church was consecrated on 20 June 1758. In 1790, the exterior of the church was clad with wooden siding to cover up the log building.

During the 1800s, the main road was built through the valley below the church (which was high up on the hill). This made the church much more difficult to access, so talk began about moving the church so that it would be along the road. A royal resolution was issued on 20 July 1895 that gave permission for this move. In 1898, the old church was disassembled, moved, and rebuilt on a new site about 1.6 kilometres (0.99 mi) to the southwest of the old church site. When the church was rebuilt, it had the same floor plan, but was somewhat altered internally. Also, the tower was built to be taller than it originally was. The church was consecrated at the new site on 9 November 1898. Later, a new burial chapel (Haugner Church) was built at the old church site.

== See also ==
- List of churches in Hamar
