= Østsinni Church =

Church in Innlandet, Norway

- Østsinni kirke
- Garder kirke / Nordre Land kirke
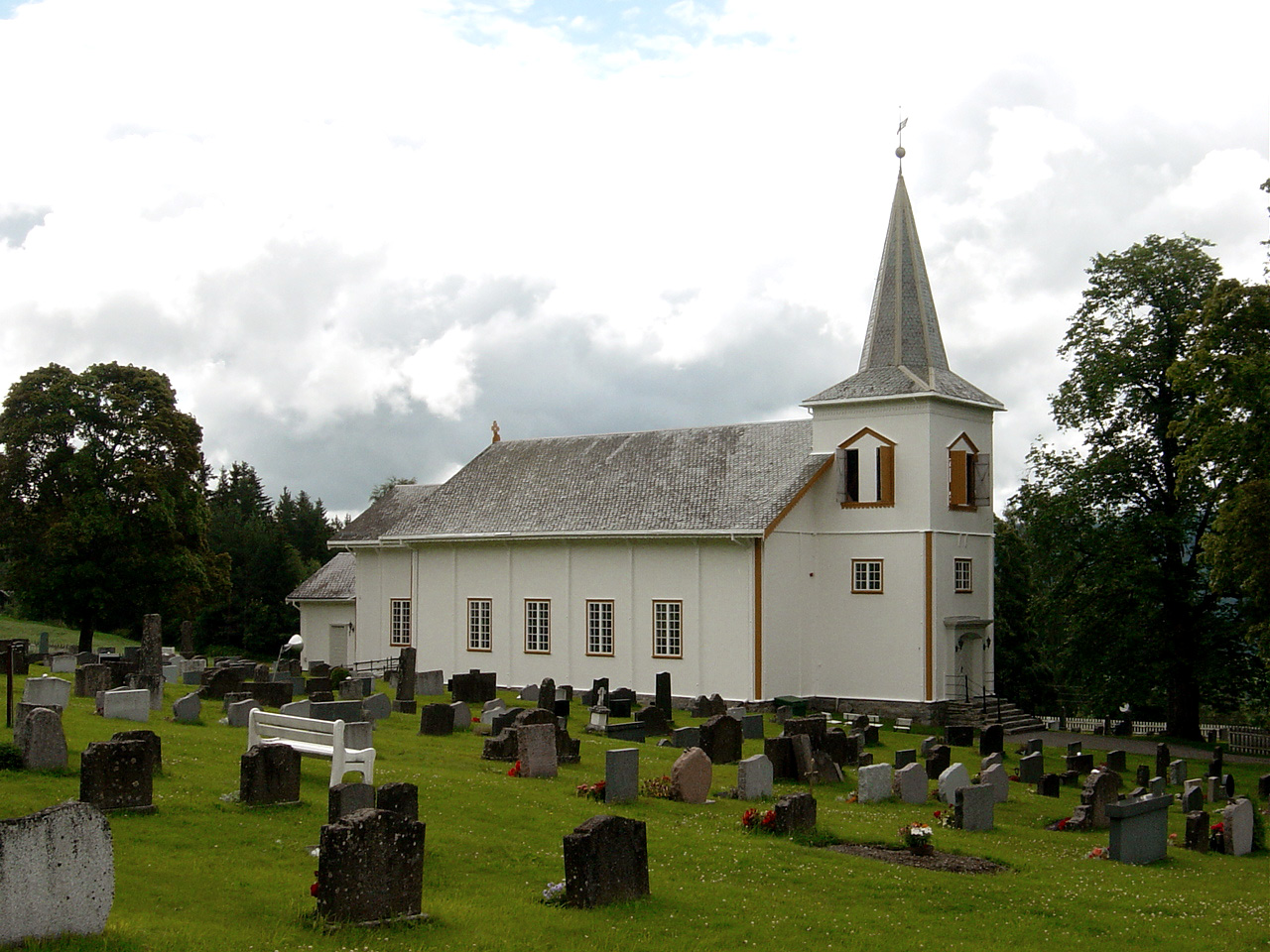
- View of the church
- Østsinni Church
- 60°50′57″N 10°04′43″E
- Location: Nordre Land, Innlandet
- Country: Norway
- Denomination: Church of Norway
- Churchmanship: Evangelical Lutheran

History
- Status: Parish church
- Founded: 1726
- Consecrated: 1877

Architecture
- Functional status: Active
- Architect: Jacob Wilhelm Nordan
- Architectural type: Long church
- Completed: 1877 (149 years ago)

Specifications
- Capacity: 350
- Materials: Wood

Administration
- Diocese: Hamar bispedømme
- Deanery: Hadeland og Land prosti
- Parish: Østsinni
- Norwegian Cultural Heritage Site
- Type: Church
- Status: Not protected
- ID: 85921

Østsinni Church (Norwegian: Østsinni kirke) is a parish church of the Church of Norway in Nordre Land Municipality in Innlandet county, Norway. It is located in the village of Dokka. It is one of the churches for the Østsinni parish which is part of the Hadeland og Land prosti (deanery) in the Diocese of Hamar. The white, wooden church was built in a long church design in 1877 using plans drawn up by the architect Jacob Wilhelm Nordan. The church seats about 350 people.

== History ==
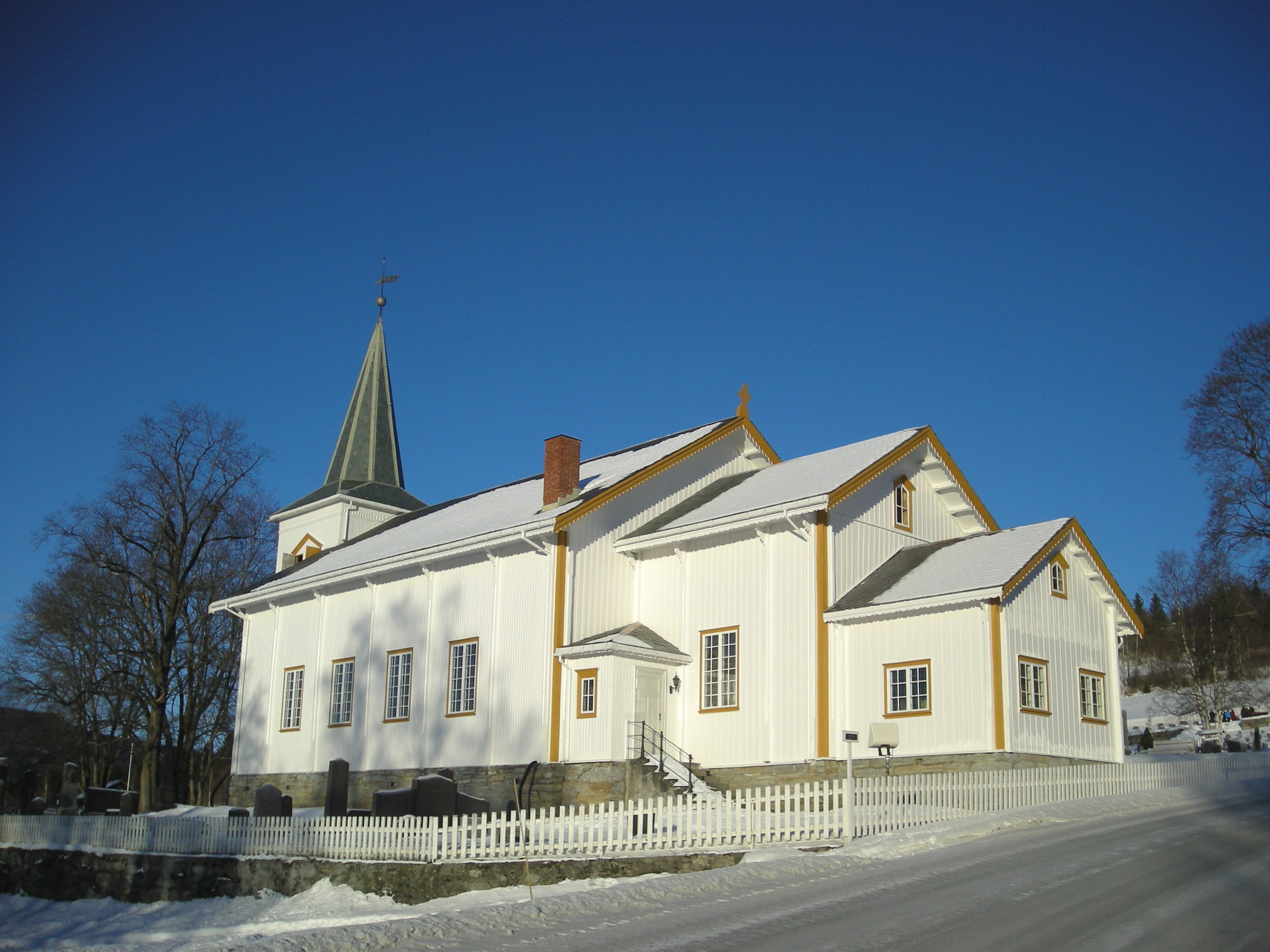
View of church

The first church built at Dokka was a wooden cruciform church that was built and consecrated in 1726. Not much is recorded about that church. In 1877, the old church was torn down and a new wooden long church was built on the same site. The new church was designed by Jacob Wilhelm Nordan. The main floor of the church measures about 357 square metres (3,840 ft^{2}) and there is also a 50-square-metre (540 ft^{2}) second floor seating gallery.

== See also ==
- List of churches in Hamar
