= Haugner Church =

Church in Innlandet, Norway

- Haugner kirke
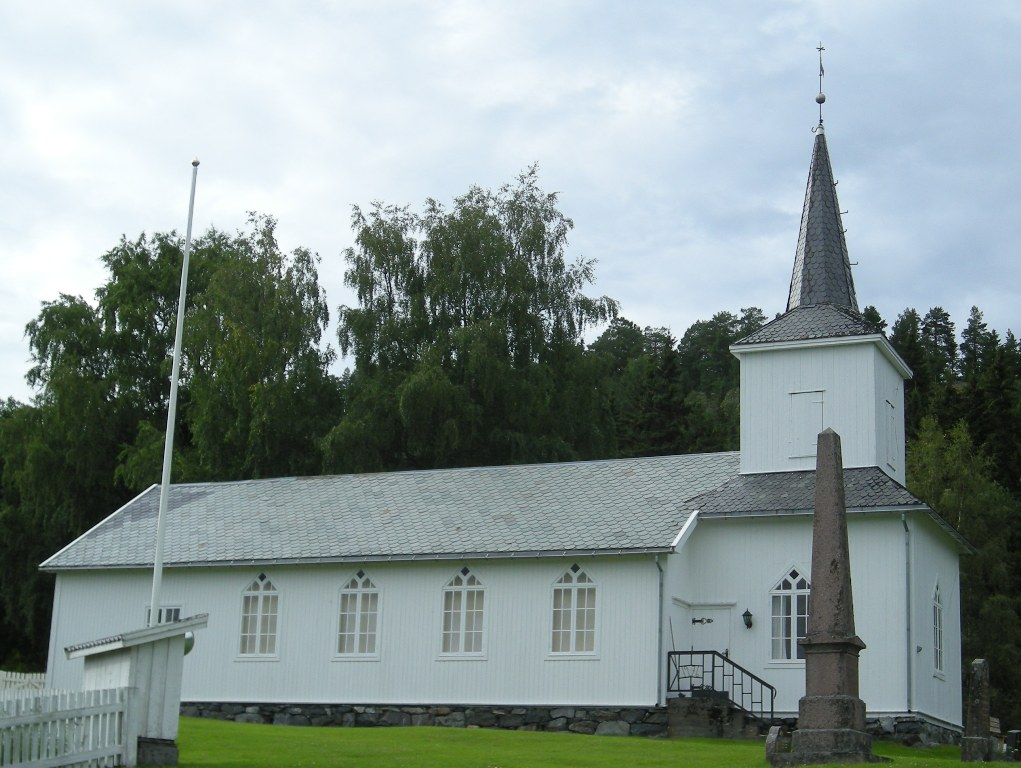
- View of the church
- Haugner Church
- 60°51′09″N 9°58′44″E
- Location: Nordre Land, Innlandet
- Country: Norway
- Denomination: Church of Norway
- Churchmanship: Evangelical Lutheran

History
- Status: Parish church
- Founded: 1950
- Consecrated: 1950

Architecture
- Functional status: Active
- Architect: Harald Myhre
- Architectural type: Long church
- Completed: 1938 (88 years ago)

Specifications
- Capacity: 100
- Materials: Wood

Administration
- Diocese: Hamar bispedømme
- Deanery: Hadeland og Land prosti
- Parish: Nordsinni
- Norwegian Cultural Heritage Site
- Type: Church
- Status: Not protected
- ID: 84503

Haugner Church (Norwegian: Haugner kirke) is a parish church of the Church of Norway in Nordre Land Municipality in Innlandet county, Norway. It is located in the village of Haugner in Nordsinni. It is one of the churches for the Nordsinni parish which is part of the Hadeland og Land prosti (deanery) in the Diocese of Hamar. The white, wooden church was built in a long church design in 1938 using plans drawn up by the architect Harald Myhre. The church seats about 100 people.

== History ==
For centuries, Nordsinni Church was located at Haugner (historically spelled Hogne). In 1898, the old Nordsinni Church was taken down and moved further down the valley to a more accessible location. Around 1900, a bell tower was built at the site of the old church, alongside the existing cemetery there. In 1938, a small burial chapel was built on the site as well. The building was designed by Harald Myhre as a long church that measured 183 square metres (1,970 sq ft) and it had room for 100 people. In 1950, the chapel was consecrated for church use by the Bishop Kristian Schjelderup.

== See also ==
- List of churches in Hamar
