= Aust-Torpa =

Village in Nordre Land Municipality, Norway

- Village
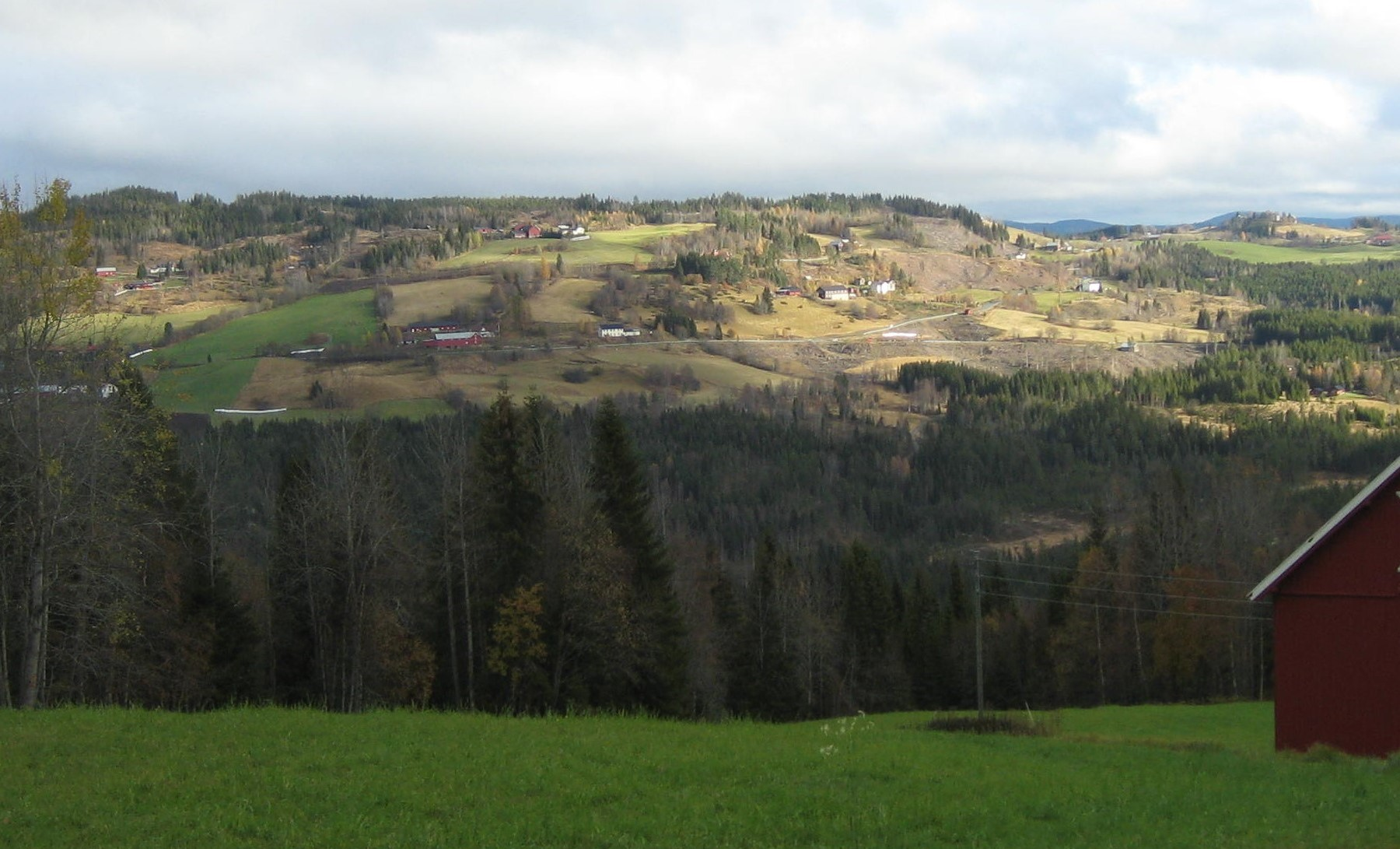
- View of the village area
- Interactive map of Aust-Torpa
- Location within Innlandet Location within Norway
- Coordinates: 60.9505°N 10.13894°E
- Country: Norway
- Region: Eastern Norway
- County: Innlandet
- District: Land
- Municipality: Nordre Land Municipality
- Elevation: 608 m (1,995 ft)
- Time zone: UTC+01:00 (CET)
  - Summer (DST): UTC+02:00 (CEST)
- Post Code: 2881 Aust-Torpa

Aust-Torpa is a village in Nordre Land Municipality in Innlandet county, Norway. The village is located on the eastern side of the river Dokka, about 15 kilometres (9.3 mi) north of the village of Dokka. Kinn Church and an elementary school are both located in the village.
