= Johan Dokka =

Norwegian politician

Johan Martinius Antonsen Dokka
- Born: 30 August 1881; Kongsberg, Norway
- Died: 7 January 1972 (aged 90)
- Occupation: Politician

Johan Martinius Antonsen Dokka (30 August 1881 – 7 January 1972) was a Norwegian politician.

He was born in Kongsberg to Anton Dokka and Martine Halvorsen. He was elected representative to the Storting for the period 1931–1933, for the Liberal Party.

Dokka died on 7 January 1972, at the age of 90.
