= Etna (river) =

River in Innlandet, Norway

Etna Etne (unofficial)
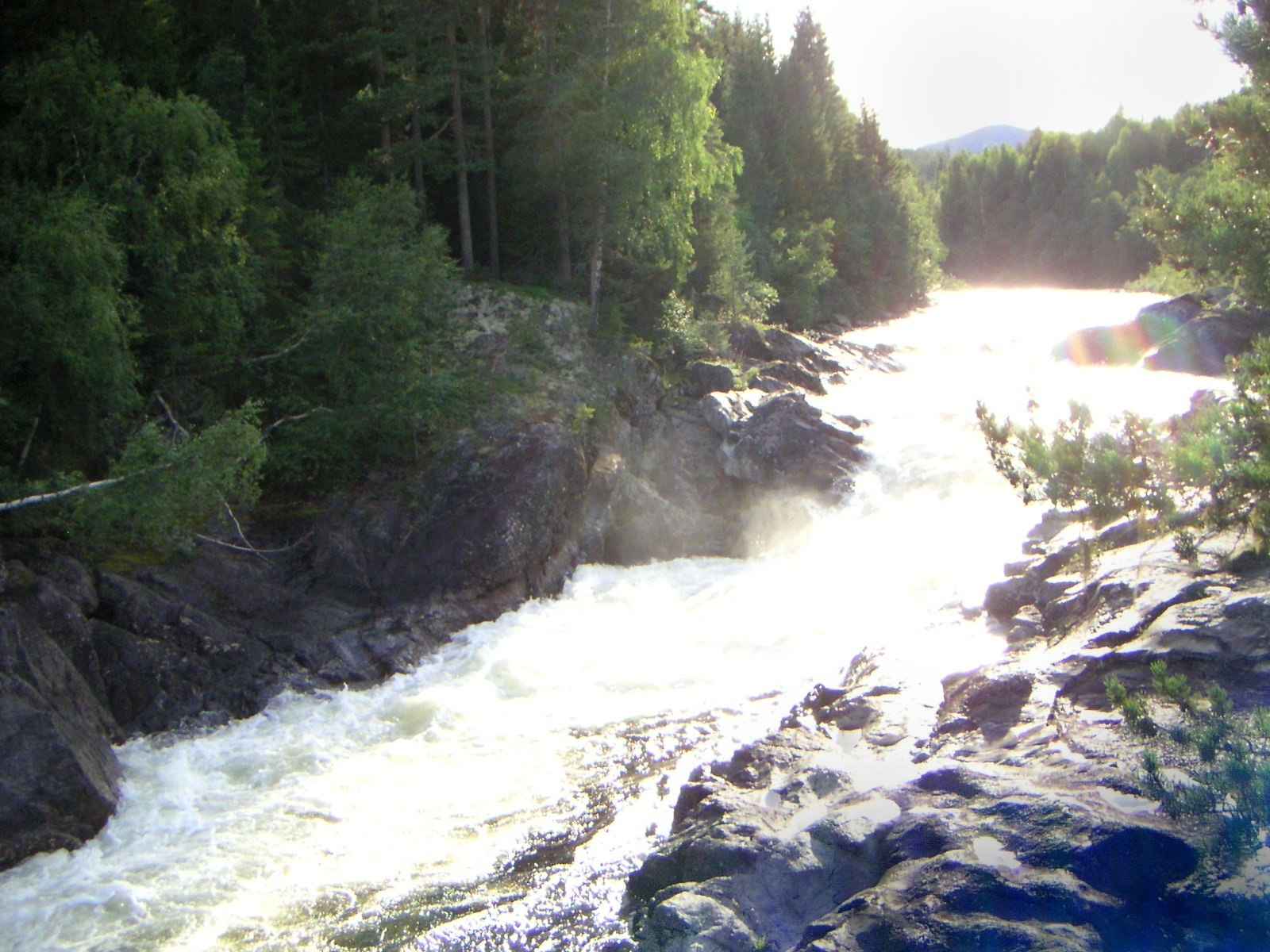
- View of the Etna river, slightly north of the rock carvings at Møllerstufossen

Location
- Country: Norway
- County: Innlandet
- Municipalities: Etnedal Municipality; Nordre Land Municipality; Nord-Aurdal Municipality; Øystre Slidre Municipality

Physical characteristics
- Source: Stortjernet lake
  - location: Øystre Slidre Municipality, Norway
  - coordinates: 61.310515°N 9.246282°E
  - elevation: 1,140 metres (3,740 ft)
- Mouth: Dokka river
  - location: Dokka, Nordre Land Municipality, Norway
  - coordinates: 60.8288811°N 10.058755°E
  - elevation: 140 metres (460 ft)
- Length: 106 km (66 mi)
- Basin size: 928.7 km^{2} (358.6 sq mi)
- Discharge
  - average: 12.57 m^{3}/s (444 cu ft/s)

The Etna is a river in the Valdres region of Innlandet county, Norway. The 106-kilometre (66 mi) long river flows through Øystre Slidre Municipality, Nord-Aurdal Municipality, Etnedal Municipality, and Nordre Land Municipality before joining the river Dokka at the village of Dokka in Nordre Land Municipality. Soon after the confluence of those two rivers, they join the Randsfjorden (a long, narrow inland lake).

The river begins near the mountains Skaget and Langsua inside the Langsua National Park. It then flows in a southerly direction. Much of the river runs through the Etnedalen valley (the namesake of Etnedal Municipality). The river runs through the village of Bruflat and then shortly after this, it begins heading in a more easterly direction. The river was formally protected from hydropower development by the government in 1993.

== See also ==
- List of rivers in Norway
