= Kinn Church (Innlandet) =

Church in Innlandet, Norway

- Kinn kirke
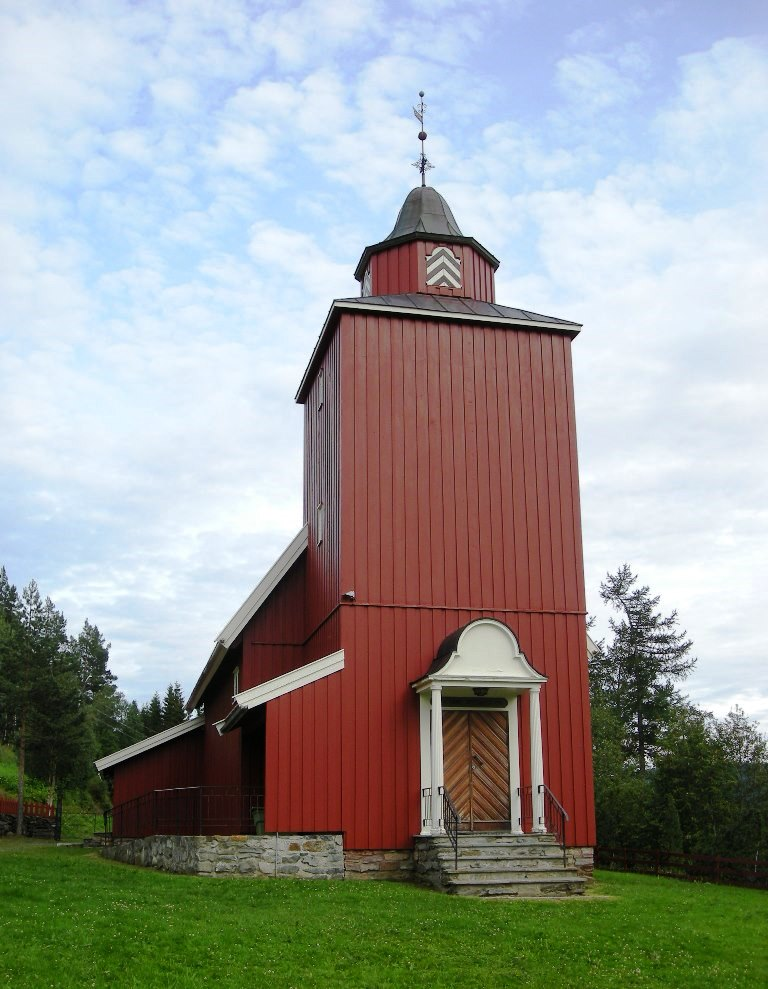
- View of the church
- Kinn Church
- 60°56′12″N 10°07′45″E
- Location: Nordre Land, Innlandet
- Country: Norway
- Denomination: Church of Norway
- Previous denomination: Catholic Church
- Churchmanship: Evangelical Lutheran

History
- Status: Parish church
- Founded: 13th century
- Consecrated: 16 September 1956

Architecture
- Functional status: Active
- Architect: Wilhelm Swensen
- Architectural type: Long church
- Completed: 1956 (70 years ago)
- Closed: 1823-1956

Specifications
- Capacity: 140
- Materials: Wood

Administration
- Diocese: Hamar bispedømme
- Deanery: Hadeland og Land prosti
- Parish: Torpa
- Norwegian Cultural Heritage Site
- Type: Church
- Status: Not protected
- ID: 84774

Kinn Church (Norwegian: Kinn kirke) is a parish church of the Church of Norway in Nordre Land Municipality in Innlandet county, Norway. It is located in the village of Aust-Torpa. It is one of the churches for the Torpa parish which is part of the Hadeland og Land prosti (deanery) in the Diocese of Hamar. The red, wooden church was built in a long church design in 1956 using plans drawn up by the architect Wilhelm Swensen. The church seats about 140 people.

== History ==
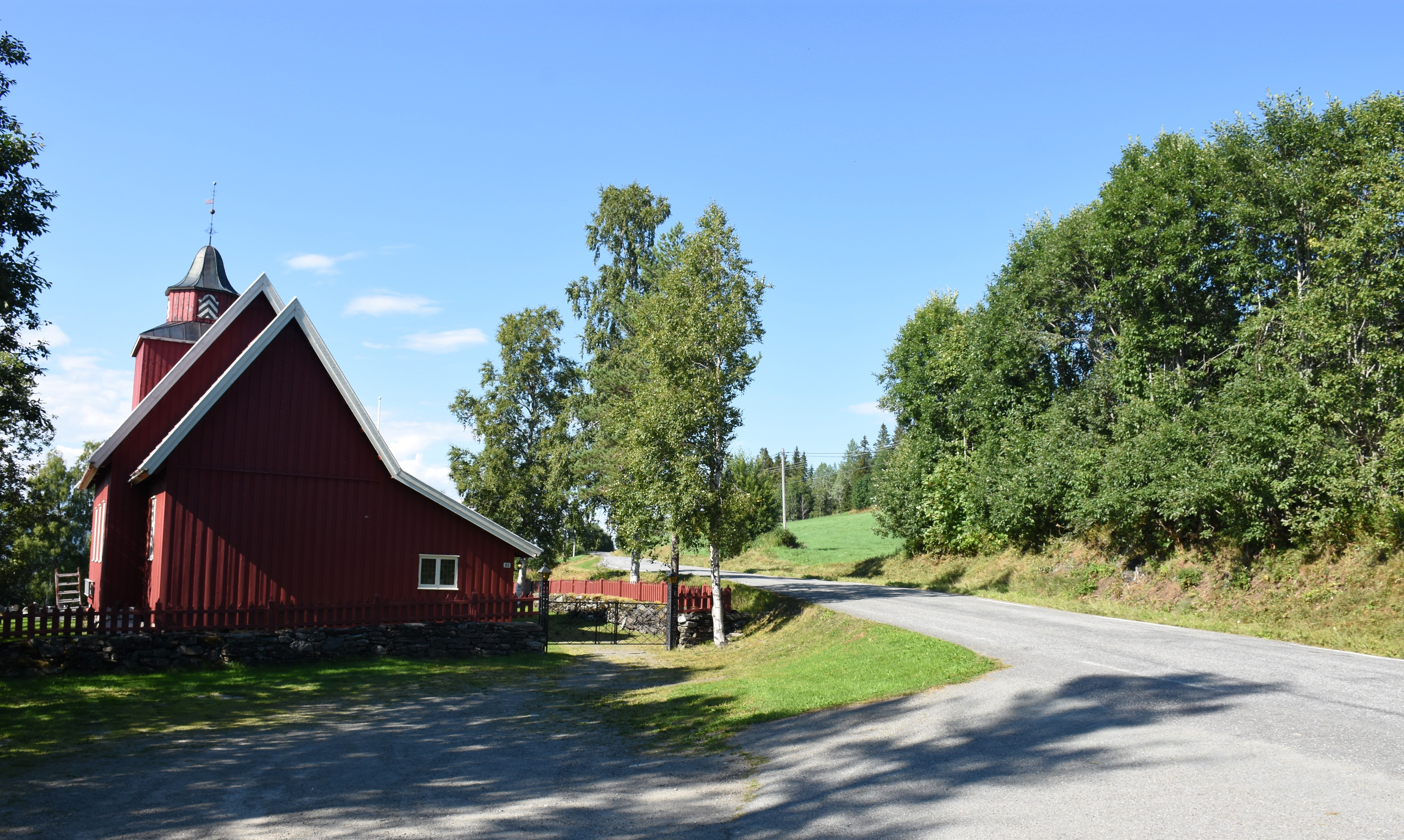
View of the church

The earliest existing historical records of the church date back to the year 1337, but the church was not built that year. The first church here was a wooden stave church that was likely built during the 13th century on the same location as the present church. Around the year 1652, a new nave was built on the west end of the old church, the old nave became the new choir and the old choir became a sacristy. The old open-air corridors that surrounded the church were removed during this renovation. In 1663, the outside of the church received exterior wood siding to cover up the log building.

In 1750-1753 the church was again expanded. This time all of the remaining parts of the original stave church were demolished and the 1652 portion of the building was kept. The church was rebuilt into a timbered cruciform church by adding three wings to the one remaining part of the building. The builder for this project was Sven Olsen Traaset. This addition must not have been well-built because by 1790, the church was described as "wretched". In 1817, the parish decided to tear down the church and to replace it with the new Åmot Church. In 1823, after the newly built Åmot Church was completed, the old Kinn Church was demolished. The furniture and salvaged materials from the building were sold to various people in the village. The cemetery remained in use after the old church was closed and torn down.

The people who lived near the old Kinn church site started pushing for a new church of their own once again starting in the 1930s. A new church was designed by Wilhelm Swensen, and in 1941 most things were ready to proceed. Of course, World War II got in the way and delayed this project for some time. It was not until 1956 that the work was carried out with the lead builder Arne Lybech from Snertingdal. The new wooden long church was consecrated on 16 September 1956.

== See also ==
- List of churches in Hamar
