= Bjørgo =

Bjørgo is a Norwegian surname. Notable people with the surname include:

- Narve Bjørgo (1936–2025), Norwegian historian
- Tore Bjørgo (born 1958), Norwegian criminologist
- Trygve Bjørgo, Norwegian educator and lyricist
