= Nordre Land Municipality =

Municipality in Innlandet, Norway

Nordre Land Municipality Nordre Land kommune
- Municipality
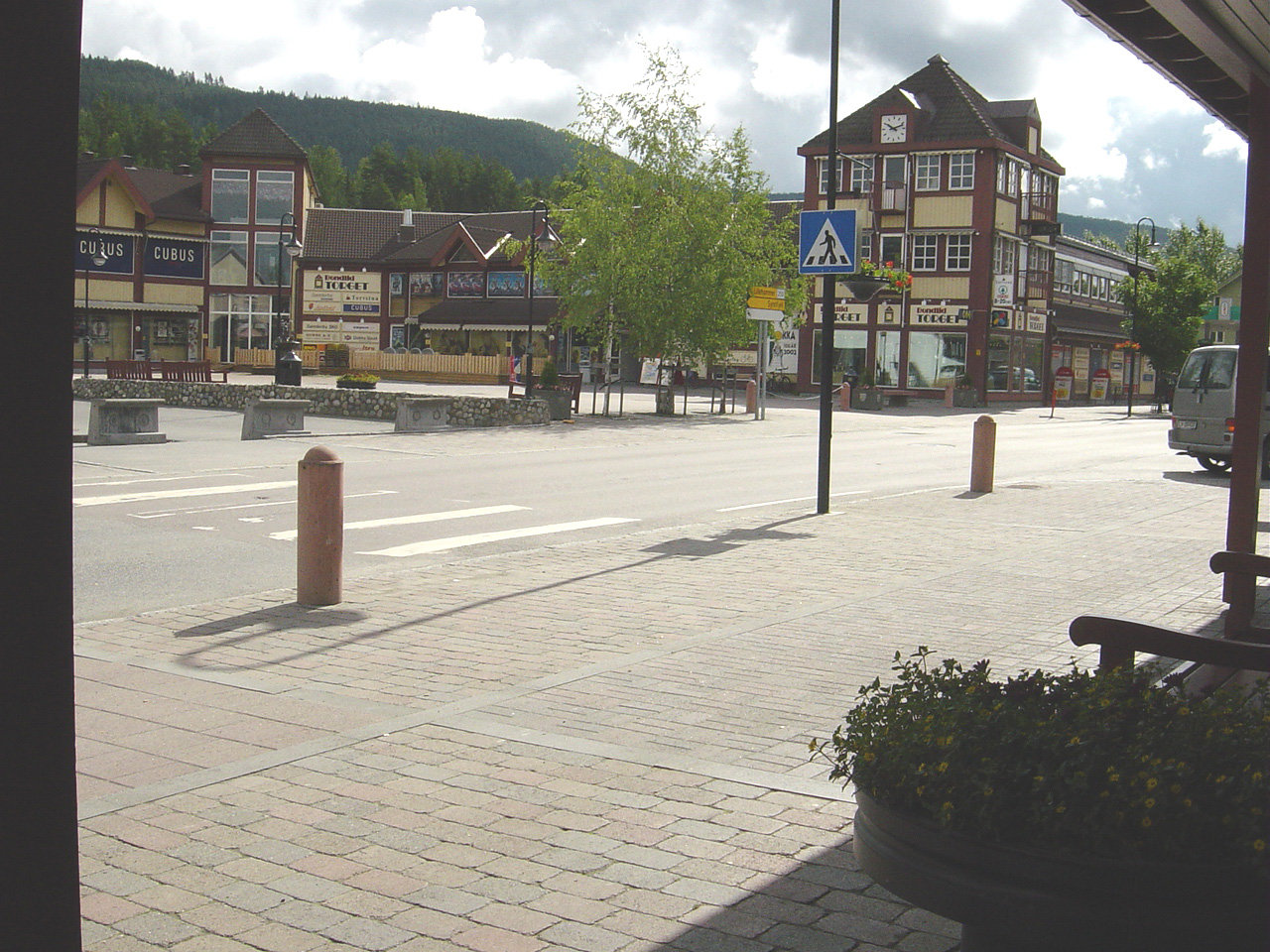
- View of the village of Dokka in Nordre Land

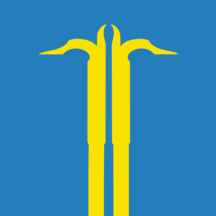
- Flag Coat of arms

- Innlandet within Norway

- Nordre Land within Innlandet
- Coordinates: 60°55′55″N 10°1′2″E
- Country: Norway
- County: Innlandet
- District: Land
- Established: 1847
  - Preceded by: Land Municipality
- Administrative centre: Dokka

Government
  - Mayor (2015): Ola Tore Dokken (Sp)

Area
  - Total: 955.32 km^{2} (368.85 sq mi)
  - Land: 920.49 km^{2} (355.40 sq mi)
  - Water: 34.83 km^{2} (13.45 sq mi) 3.6%
  - Rank: #122 in Norway
- Highest elevation: 1,414.39 m (4,640.4 ft)

Population (2025)
  - Total: 6,544
  - Rank: #151 in Norway
  - Density: 6.9/km^{2} (18/sq mi)
  - Change (10 years): ▼ −2.8%
- Demonym: Nordrelending

Official language
  - Norwegian form: Bokmål
- Time zone: UTC+01:00 (CET)
  - Summer (DST): UTC+02:00 (CEST)
- ISO 3166 code: NO-3448
- Website: Official website

Nordre Land is a municipality in Innlandet county, Norway. It is located in the traditional district of Land. The administrative centre of the municipality is the village of Dokka. Other villages in the municipality include Vest-Torpa, Nord-Torpa, Aust-Torpa, Fagerlund, and Nordsinni.

The 955.32-square-kilometre (368.85 sq mi) municipality is the 122nd largest by area out of the 357 municipalities in Norway. Nordre Land Municipality is the 151st most populous municipality in Norway with a population of 6,544. The municipality's population density is 6.9 inhabitants per square kilometre (18/sq mi) and its population has decreased by 2.8% over the previous 10-year period.

== General information ==
The old Land Municipality was established on 1 January 1838 after the formannskapsdistrikt law went into effect. This municipality was quite large and in less than a decade, the municipality was divided. In 1847, the old Land Municipality was divided into Nordre Land Municipality (population: 4,595) in the north and Søndre Land Municipality (population: 4,604) in the south. On 1 January 1868, a part of Søndre Land Municipality (population: 340) was transferred to Nordre Land Municipality. On 1 January 1914, Nordre Land Municipality was divided into two municipalities: Torpen Municipality (population: 2,219) in the north and Nordre Land Municipality (population: 2,570) in the south. During the 1960s, there were many municipal mergers across Norway due to the work of the Schei Committee. On 1 January 1962, Nordre Land Municipality (population: 3,870) was merged with the neighboring Torpa Municipality (population: 2,620) and the Tranlia and Store Røen areas of the neighboring Fluberg Municipality (population: 196).

Historically, this municipality was part of the old Oppland county. On 1 January 2020, the municipality became a part of the newly-formed Innlandet county (after Hedmark and Oppland counties were merged).

=== Name ===
The municipality (originally the parish) is named after the historical district of Land (Old Norse: Land) which was once a petty kingdom of its own. The name is identical to the word land which means "land". In 1847, when the old Land Municipality was divided, the municipality was named Nordre Land, using the old name plus the word nordre which means "northern", therefore the name means "(the) northern (part of) Land".

=== Coat of arms ===
The coat of arms was granted on 20 November 1987. The official blazon is "Azure, two log-driving hooks Or addorsed issuant from the base" (Norwegian: I blått to oppvoksende adosserte gull fløterhaker). This means the arms have a blue field (background) and the charge is two hooks for log driving (Norwegian: brøtningshaker) which are aligned vertically like a mirror image. The charge has a tincture of Or (heraldry) which means it is commonly colored yellow, but if it is made out of metal, then gold is used. The blue color in the field symbolizes the local rivers and lakes. The log driving hook was chosen because of the rich local traditions of forestry and log driving, including the vast number of log dams within the area. Tools were required for the log driving, and the local blacksmiths made pike poles. Every blacksmith created his own shape or design for the poles, and one of the most famous pike poles in Nordre Land was the design made by the blacksmith Kristian Halden. In addition to pike poles he made knives. The poles and knives were named "Hæillhakar" and "Hæillakniver" by the locals. It is the "Halden Pole" which has been the model for the municipal arms of Nordre Land. The arms were designed by Dag Magne Staurheim. The municipal flag has the same design as the coat of arms.

=== Churches ===
The Church of Norway has four parishes (sokn) within Nordre Land Municipality. It is part of the Hadeland og Land prosti (deanery) in the Diocese of Hamar.

Churches in Nordre Land Municipality
Parish (sokn)	Church name	Location of the church	Year built
Lunde	Lunde Church (Innlandet)	Lunde	1769
Nordsinni	Haugner Church	Nordsinni	1950
Nordsinni	Nordsinni Church	Nordsinni	1758
Torpa	Kinn Church	Aust-Torpa	1956
Torpa	Åmot Church	Fagerlund	1823
Østsinni	Østsinni Church	Dokka	1877
Østsinni	Vølstad Church	Vølstad	1959

== Geography ==
Nordre Land Municipality is located in the traditional district of Land. It is bordered on the north by Nord-Aurdal Municipality and Gausdal Municipality, on the northeast by Lillehammer Municipality, on the east by Gjøvik Municipality, on the south by Søndre Land Municipality, on the southwest by Sør-Aurdal Municipality, and on the west by Etnedal Municipality.

The river Etna flows from Etnedal and through western parts of the municipality down into the Randsfjorden. Lake Akksjøen is also in this area. The highest point in the municipality is the 1,414.39-metre (4,640.4 ft) tall mountain Spåtind.

== Climate ==
Climate data for Vest-Torpa II (542 m)
Month	Jan	Feb	Mar	Apr	May	Jun	Jul	Aug	Sep	Oct	Nov	Dec	Year
Mean daily maximum °C (°F)	−3 (27)	−1.6 (29.1)	2.4 (36.3)	7.3 (45.1)	12.9 (55.2)	17.2 (63.0)	19.5 (67.1)	17.8 (64.0)	12.8 (55.0)	6 (43)	0.5 (32.9)	−2.5 (27.5)	7.4 (45.4)
Daily mean °C (°F)	−6.7 (19.9)	−6.1 (21.0)	−2.7 (27.1)	2.2 (36.0)	7.2 (45.0)	11.5 (52.7)	13.9 (57.0)	12.5 (54.5)	8 (46)	2.4 (36.3)	−2.5 (27.5)	−6.2 (20.8)	2.8 (37.0)
Mean daily minimum °C (°F)	−10.1 (13.8)	−10.1 (13.8)	−7.2 (19.0)	−2.4 (27.7)	1.7 (35.1)	6.1 (43.0)	8.8 (47.8)	7.7 (45.9)	4.1 (39.4)	−0.6 (30.9)	−5.4 (22.3)	−9.5 (14.9)	−1.4 (29.5)
Average precipitation mm (inches)	60.9 (2.40)	41.9 (1.65)	45.6 (1.80)	45.2 (1.78)	71.6 (2.82)	89 (3.5)	106.5 (4.19)	110.4 (4.35)	79.7 (3.14)	78 (3.1)	73.4 (2.89)	54.4 (2.14)	856.6 (33.76)
Average precipitation days (≥ 1.0 mm)	12	10	9	9	11	12	14	14	11	13	14	12	141
Source: NOAA - WMO averages 91-2020 Norway

== Government ==
Nordre Land Municipality is responsible for primary education (through 10th grade), outpatient health services, senior citizen services, welfare and other social services, zoning, economic development, and municipal roads and utilities. The municipality is governed by a municipal council of directly elected representatives. The mayor is indirectly elected by a vote of the municipal council. The municipality is under the jurisdiction of the Vestoppland og Valdres District Court and the Eidsivating Court of Appeal.

=== Municipal council ===
The municipal council (Kommunestyre) of Nordre Land Municipality is made up of 23 representatives that are elected to four year terms. The tables below show the current and historical composition of the council by political party.

Nordre Land kommunestyre 2023–2027
Party name (in Norwegian)	Number of representatives
Labour Party (Arbeiderpartiet)	7
Progress Party (Fremskrittspartiet)	2
Conservative Party (Høyre)	2
Centre Party (Senterpartiet)	8
Socialist Left Party (Sosialistisk Venstreparti)	2
Joint list of the Liberal Party (Venstre) and Christian Democratic Party (Kristelig Folkeparti)	1
Local list for Nordre Land (Bygdelista for Nordre Land)	1
Total number of members:	23

Nordre Land kommunestyre 2019–2023
Party name (in Norwegian)	Number of representatives
Labour Party (Arbeiderpartiet)	11
Conservative Party (Høyre)	2
Centre Party (Senterpartiet)	11
Socialist Left Party (Sosialistisk Venstreparti)	2
Local list for Nordre Land (Bygdelista for Nordre Land)	2
Total number of members:	27

Nordre Land kommunestyre 2015–2019
Party name (in Norwegian)	Number of representatives
Labour Party (Arbeiderpartiet)	9
Conservative Party (Høyre)	3
Centre Party (Senterpartiet)	12
Socialist Left Party (Sosialistisk Venstreparti)	1
Local list for Nordre Land (Bygdelista for Nordre Land)	2
Total number of members:	27

Nordre Land kommunestyre 2011–2015
Party name (in Norwegian)	Number of representatives
Labour Party (Arbeiderpartiet)	14
Progress Party (Fremskrittspartiet)	2
Conservative Party (Høyre)	3
Christian Democratic Party (Kristelig Folkeparti)	1
Centre Party (Senterpartiet)	4
Socialist Left Party (Sosialistisk Venstreparti)	1
Local list for Nordre Land (Bygdelista for Nordre Land)	2
Total number of members:	27

Nordre Land kommunestyre 2007–2011
Party name (in Norwegian)	Number of representatives
Labour Party (Arbeiderpartiet)	13
Progress Party (Fremskrittspartiet)	2
Conservative Party (Høyre)	2
Christian Democratic Party (Kristelig Folkeparti)	1
Centre Party (Senterpartiet)	4
Socialist Left Party (Sosialistisk Venstreparti)	2
Local list for Nordre Land (Bygdelista for Nordre Land)	3
Total number of members:	27

Nordre Land kommunestyre 2003–2007
Party name (in Norwegian)	Number of representatives
Labour Party (Arbeiderpartiet)	13
Progress Party (Fremskrittspartiet)	2
Conservative Party (Høyre)	2
Christian Democratic Party (Kristelig Folkeparti)	1
Centre Party (Senterpartiet)	3
Socialist Left Party (Sosialistisk Venstreparti)	3
Local list for Nordre Land (Bygdelista for Nordre Land)	3
Total number of members:	27

Nordre Land kommunestyre 1999–2003
Party name (in Norwegian)	Number of representatives
Labour Party (Arbeiderpartiet)	15
Progress Party (Fremskrittspartiet)	1
Conservative Party (Høyre)	2
Christian Democratic Party (Kristelig Folkeparti)	2
Centre Party (Senterpartiet)	3
Socialist Left Party (Sosialistisk Venstreparti)	2
Local list for Nordre Land (Bygdelista for Nordre Land)	6
Total number of members:	31

Nordre Land kommunestyre 1995–1999
Party name (in Norwegian)	Number of representatives
Labour Party (Arbeiderpartiet)	18
Conservative Party (Høyre)	2
Christian Democratic Party (Kristelig Folkeparti)	2
Centre Party (Senterpartiet)	6
Socialist Left Party (Sosialistisk Venstreparti)	2
Liberal Party (Venstre)	1
Total number of members:	31

Nordre Land kommunestyre 1991–1995
Party name (in Norwegian)	Number of representatives
Labour Party (Arbeiderpartiet)	17
Progress Party (Fremskrittspartiet)	1
Conservative Party (Høyre)	3
Christian Democratic Party (Kristelig Folkeparti)	1
Centre Party (Senterpartiet)	5
Socialist Left Party (Sosialistisk Venstreparti)	3
Liberal Party (Venstre)	1
Total number of members:	31

Nordre Land kommunestyre 1987–1991
Party name (in Norwegian)	Number of representatives
Labour Party (Arbeiderpartiet)	22
Conservative Party (Høyre)	3
Christian Democratic Party (Kristelig Folkeparti)	1
Centre Party (Senterpartiet)	3
Socialist Left Party (Sosialistisk Venstreparti)	1
Liberal Party (Venstre)	1
Total number of members:	31

Nordre Land kommunestyre 1983–1987
Party name (in Norwegian)	Number of representatives
Labour Party (Arbeiderpartiet)	22
Conservative Party (Høyre)	3
Christian Democratic Party (Kristelig Folkeparti)	1
Centre Party (Senterpartiet)	3
Socialist Left Party (Sosialistisk Venstreparti)	1
Liberal Party (Venstre)	1
Total number of members:	31

Nordre Land kommunestyre 1979–1983
Party name (in Norwegian)	Number of representatives
Labour Party (Arbeiderpartiet)	19
Conservative Party (Høyre)	4
Christian Democratic Party (Kristelig Folkeparti)	2
Centre Party (Senterpartiet)	3
Socialist Left Party (Sosialistisk Venstreparti)	1
Liberal Party (Venstre)	1
Nordre Land cross-party list (Nordre Land tverrpolitiske liste)	1
Total number of members:	31

Nordre Land kommunestyre 1975–1979
Party name (in Norwegian)	Number of representatives
Labour Party (Arbeiderpartiet)	20
Conservative Party (Høyre)	2
Christian Democratic Party (Kristelig Folkeparti)	2
Centre Party (Senterpartiet)	4
Liberal Party (Venstre)	1
Nordre Land cross-party list (Nordre Land tverrpolitiske liste)	2
Total number of members:	31

Nordre Land kommunestyre 1971–1975
Party name (in Norwegian)	Number of representatives
Labour Party (Arbeiderpartiet)	20
Conservative Party (Høyre)	1
Christian Democratic Party (Kristelig Folkeparti)	1
Centre Party (Senterpartiet)	5
Liberal Party (Venstre)	1
Nordre Land cross-party list (Nordre Land tverrpolitiske liste)	3
Total number of members:	31

Nordre Land kommunestyre 1967–1971
Party name (in Norwegian)	Number of representatives
Labour Party (Arbeiderpartiet)	22
Conservative Party (Høyre)	1
Christian Democratic Party (Kristelig Folkeparti)	1
Centre Party (Senterpartiet)	5
Liberal Party (Venstre)	2
Total number of members:	31

Nordre Land kommunestyre 1963–1967
Party name (in Norwegian)	Number of representatives
Labour Party (Arbeiderpartiet)	21
Christian Democratic Party (Kristelig Folkeparti)	2
Centre Party (Senterpartiet)	6
Liberal Party (Venstre)	2
Total number of members:	31

Nordre Land herredsstyre 1959–1963
Party name (in Norwegian)	Number of representatives
Labour Party (Arbeiderpartiet)	11
Conservative Party (Høyre)	1
Centre Party (Senterpartiet)	4
Liberal Party (Venstre)	1
Total number of members:	17
Note: In 1962, Nordre Land merged with Torpa and the two councils were merged until the next election.

Nordre Land herredsstyre 1955–1959
Party name (in Norwegian)	Number of representatives
Labour Party (Arbeiderpartiet)	7
Conservative Party (Høyre)	1
Farmers' Party (Bondepartiet)	4
Liberal Party (Venstre)	1
List of workers, fishermen, and small farmholders (Arbeidere, fiskere, småbrukere liste)	4
Total number of members:	17

Nordre Land herredsstyre 1951–1955
Party name (in Norwegian)	Number of representatives
Labour Party (Arbeiderpartiet)	9
Joint List(s) of Non-Socialist Parties (Borgerlige Felleslister)	7
Total number of members:	16

Nordre Land herredsstyre 1947–1951
Party name (in Norwegian)	Number of representatives
Labour Party (Arbeiderpartiet)	9
Joint list of the Liberal Party (Venstre) and the Radical People's Party (Radikale Folkepartiet)	2
Joint List(s) of Non-Socialist Parties (Borgerlige Felleslister)	5
Total number of members:	16

Nordre Land herredsstyre 1945–1947
Party name (in Norwegian)	Number of representatives
Labour Party (Arbeiderpartiet)	10
Joint list of the Liberal Party (Venstre) and the Radical People's Party (Radikale Folkepartiet)	1
Joint List(s) of Non-Socialist Parties (Borgerlige Felleslister)	2
Local List(s) (Lokale lister)	3
Total number of members:	16

Nordre Land herredsstyre 1937–1940*
Party name (in Norwegian)	Number of representatives
Labour Party (Arbeiderpartiet)	7
Joint list of the Liberal Party (Venstre) and the Radical People's Party (Radikale Folkepartiet)	1
Joint List(s) of Non-Socialist Parties (Borgerlige Felleslister)	8
Total number of members:	16
Note: Due to the German occupation of Norway during World War II, no elections were held for new municipal councils until after the war ended in 1945.

=== Mayors ===
The mayor (Norwegian: ordfører) of Nordre Land Municipality is the political leader of the municipality and the chairperson of the municipal council. Here is a list of people who have held this position:

- 1847–1848: Ole Hannibal Lie
- 1849–1856: Arne Baggerud
- 1857–1861: Johannes Sollien
- 1862–1865: Halvard Hauk Alsing
- 1866–1872: Johannes Frøsaker
- 1872–1879: Haldor Eriksen Felde
- 1880–1885: Oluf Kind
- 1886–1887: Haldor Eriksen Felde
- 1888–1890: G. Andersen
- 1890–1910: Christian Snilsberg
- 1911–1918: Nikolai Lien
- 1919–1921: Torstein Rudi
- 1922–1924: Henrik Hagen
- 1925–1931: Torstein Rudi
- 1932–1944: Nils Rognerud
- 1946–1955: Odd Brekke (Ap)
- 1956–1984: Hans Christian Endrerud (Ap)
- 1984–1995: Nils Herman Sundby (Ap)
- 1996–2002: Rolf Ødegård (Ap)
- 2002–2004: Rolf Rønningen (Ap)
- 2004–2015: Liv Solveig Alfstad (Ap)
- 2015–present: Ola Tore Dokken (Sp)

== Attractions ==
- The rock carvings at Møllerstufossen are more than 6,000 years old. There are 11 carvings of moose, and also two that are more difficult to interpret. Sometime in the Stone Age this must have been an important place.
- The Lands Museum is located in Dokka. About thirty buildings are reassembled in the area. In the main building from the Thomle farm there are rococo paintings on the walls by Peder Aadnes dating from about 1750.
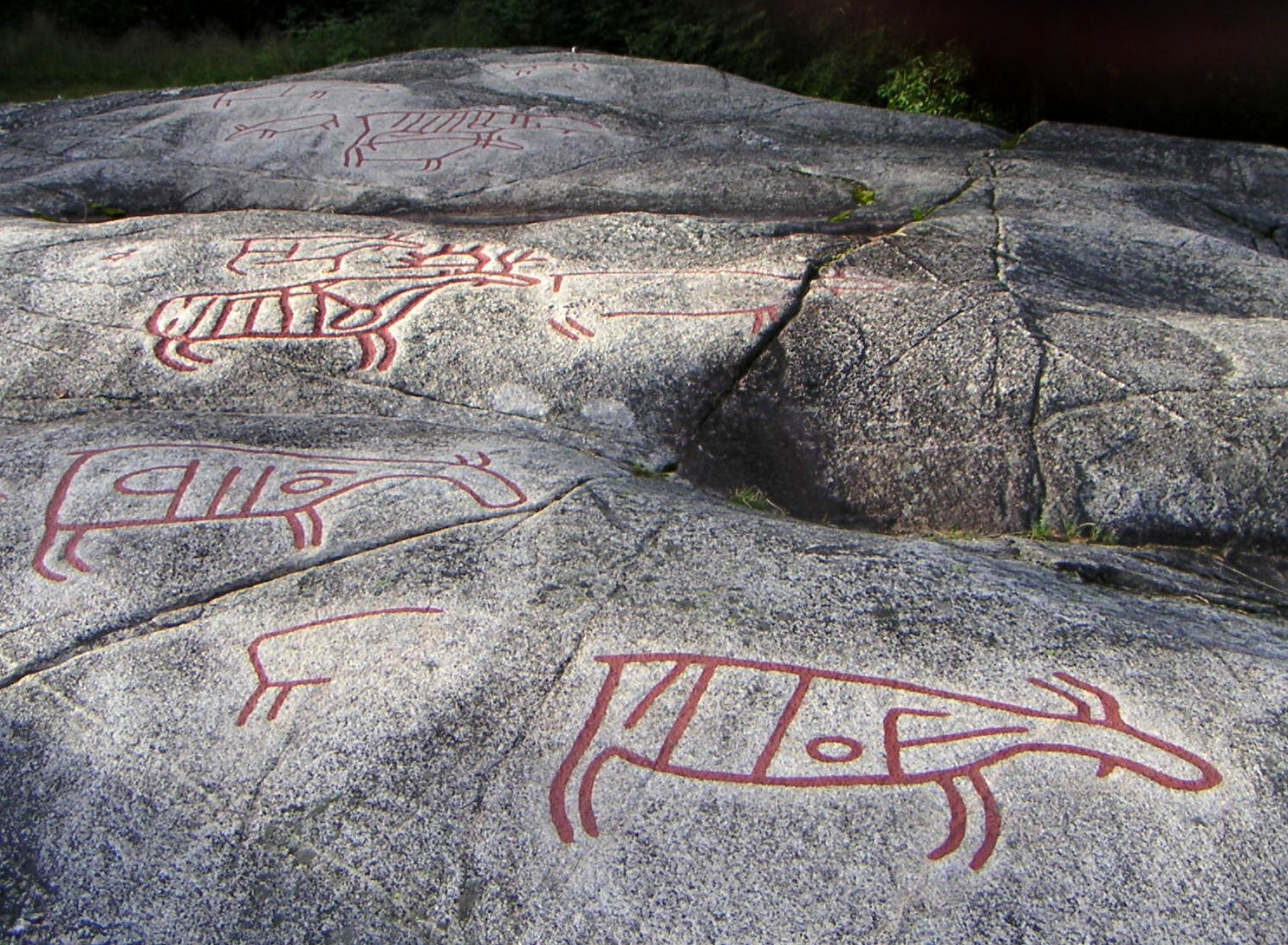
Rock carvings at Møllerstufossen

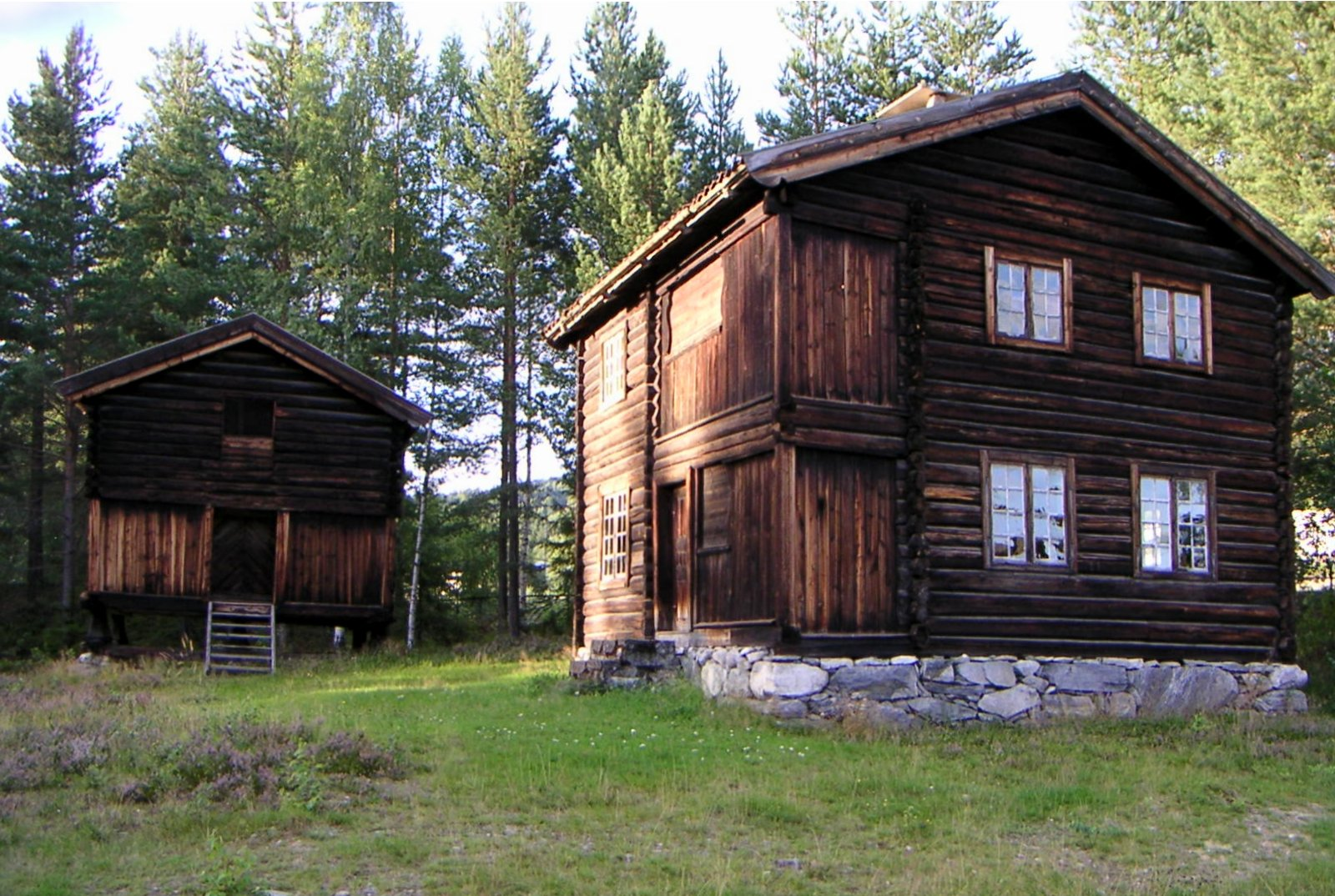
Main house Halmrast, Lands Museum

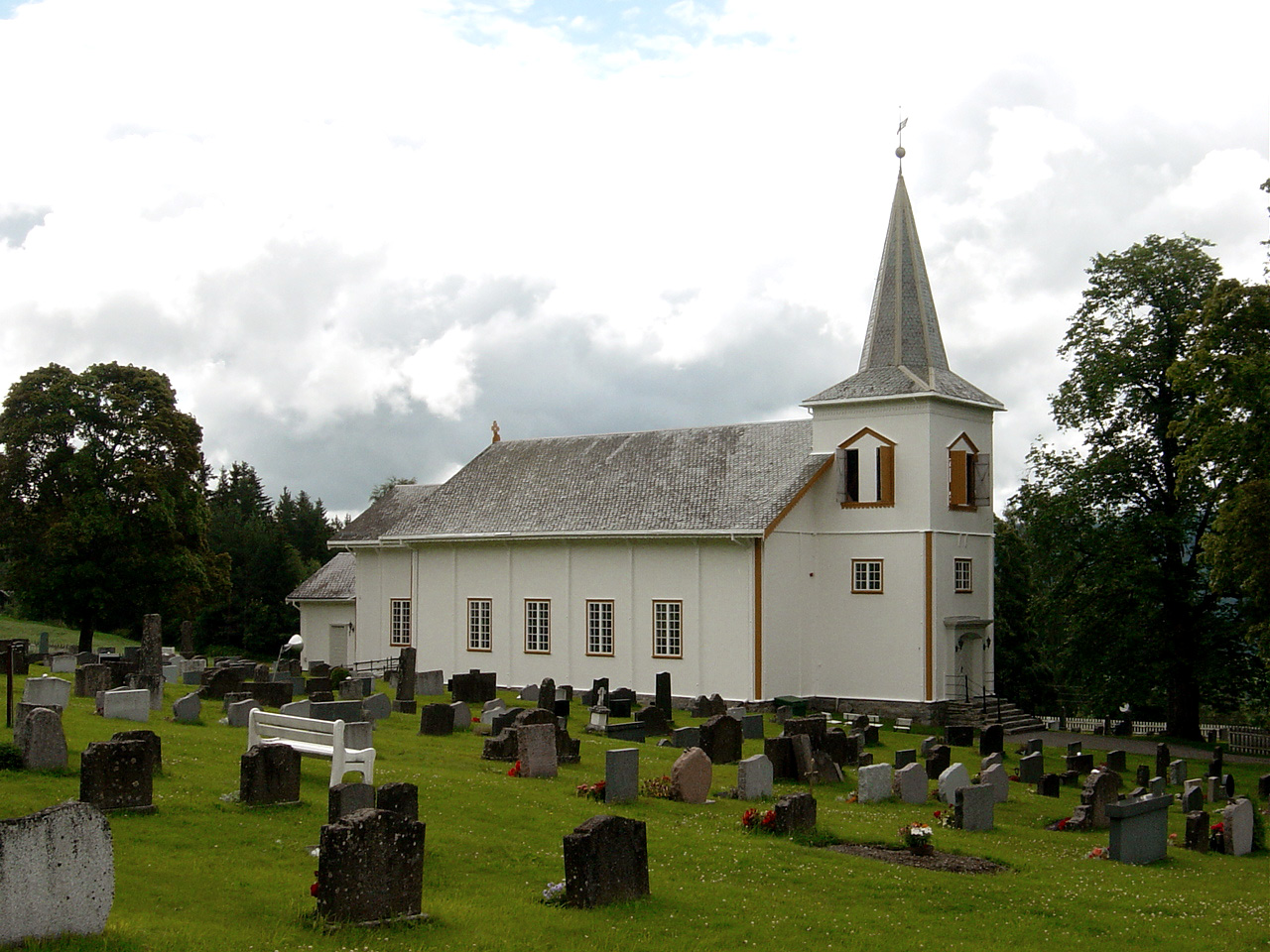
Østsinni church in Dokka

== Notable people ==
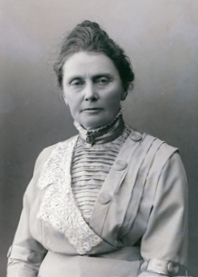
Anna Rogstad, 1912

- Jacob Sverdrup Smitt (1835–1889), a politician and bishop in the Diocese of Tromsø
- Anna Rogstad (1845-1938), an educator, women's rights activist, and first woman elected to the Storting
- Jens Bratlie (1856–1939), an attorney, military officer, and party leader
- Linn T. Sunne (born 1971), a children's writer

=== Sport ===
- Ole Kolterud (1903–1974), a skier who competed at the 1928 Winter Olympics
- Sverre Kolterud (1908–1996), a Nordic combined skier who competed at the 1932 Winter Olympics
- Rune Brattsveen (born 1984), a former biathlete
