= Dokka =

Village in Nordre Land Municipality, Norway

- Village
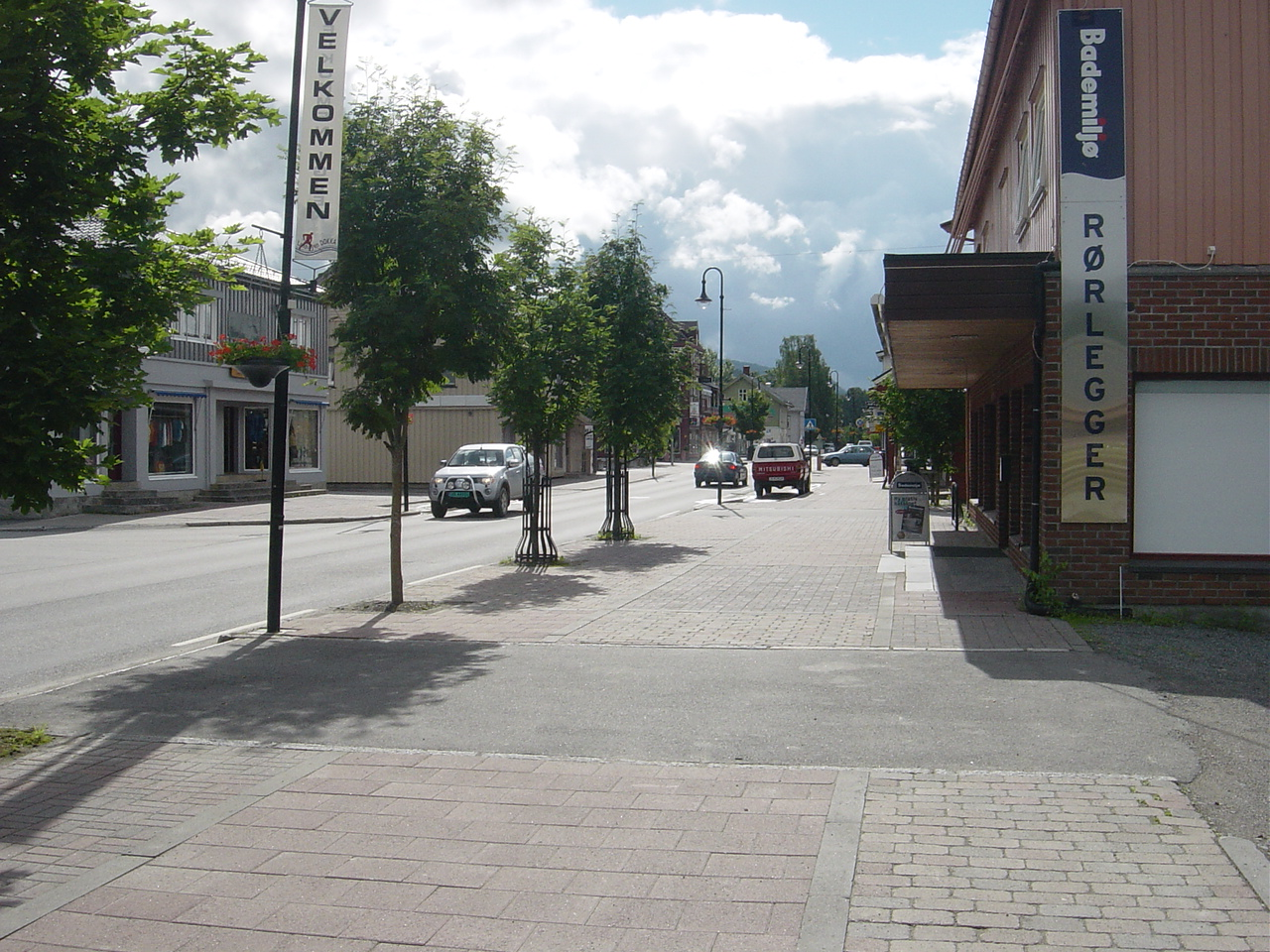
- View of the village
- Interactive map of Dokka
- Location within Innlandet Location within Norway
- Coordinates: 60.84°N 10.06181°E
- Country: Norway
- Region: Eastern Norway
- County: Innlandet
- District: Land
- Municipality: Nordre Land Municipality

Area
  - Total: 3.45 km^{2} (1.33 sq mi)
- Elevation: 159 m (522 ft)

Population (2024)
  - Total: 2,944
  - Density: 853/km^{2} (2,210/sq mi)
- Time zone: UTC+01:00 (CET)
  - Summer (DST): UTC+02:00 (CEST)
- Post Code: 2870 Dokka

Dokka is the administrative centre of Nordre Land Municipality in Innlandet county, Norway. The village is located at the confluence of the rivers Dokka and Etna, about 5 kilometres (3.1 mi) north of the lake Randsfjorden, the fourth largest lake in Norway. The Østsinni Church is located on the north edge of the village.

The 3.45-square-kilometre (850-acre) village has a population (2024) of 2,944 and a population density of 853 inhabitants per square kilometre (2,210/sq mi).

The Norwegian County Road 33 runs from Odnes in the southeast through Dokka, past Nordsinni and westwards to Etnedal and Bjørgo. Norwegian County Road 245 runs to the south from Dokka, along the west side of the Randsfjorden to Bjoneroa. Norwegian County Road 250 heads north from Dokka towards Aust-Torpa. In 2002, Dokka celebrated its 100th anniversary.

== Name ==
The village is named after the local river Dokka, a tributary of the river Etna. The name of the river Dokka is derived from Old Norse Dǫkka, which comes from the word dǫkk, meaning a "pit" or a "hollow".

== Notable people ==
- Rune Brattsveen (born 1984), a biathlete
- Kjetil Bjørklund (born 1967), a Norwegian politician for the Socialist Left Party
- Joachim Sørum (born 1979), a footballer

== See also ==
- Dokka Station, a former railway station in Dokka
