= 1938 in Norway =

- Centuries: 18th; 19th; 20th; 21st
- Decades: 1910s; 1920s; 1930s; 1940s; 1950s
- See also: List of years in Norway

Events in the year 1938 in Norway.

== Incumbents ==
- Monarch – Haakon VII.
- Prime Minister – Johan Nygaardsvold (Labour Party)

== Events ==
- 14 January – Norway claims Queen Maud Land in Antarctica.
- 24 June – Parliament passes a law making compulsory national unemployment insurance operative for most wage earners.
- 6-15 July – Évian Conference: The Norwegian delegation submitts multiple formal declarations on Jewish refugee and immigration law issues.
- 20 November – Queen Maud of Norway dies

=== Undated ===
- Construction starts on Kristiansand Airport, Kjevik
- The Norwegian Mining Museum is established.

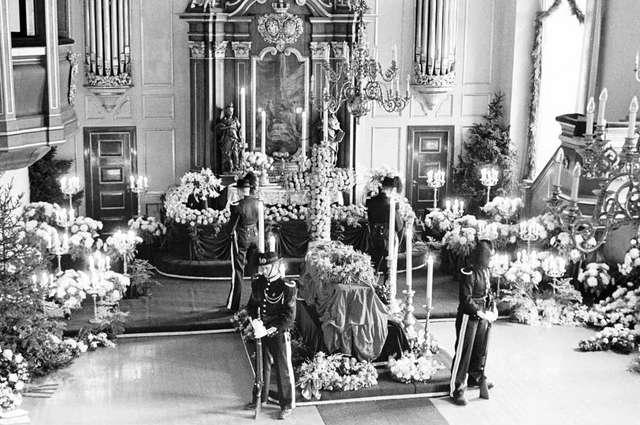
Queen Maud's coffin at Akershus Castle, guarded by four Royal Guards.

== Popular culture ==
=== Literature ===
d’Aulaires’ Book of Norwegian Folktales - first printed in 1938

== Notable births ==
=== January ===
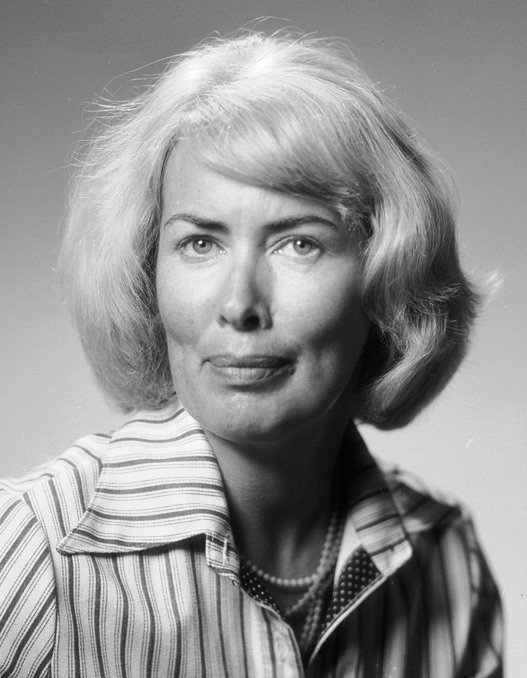
Anne Karin Elstad

- 2 January – Hans Herbjørnsrud, short story writer.
- 9 January – Agnar Sandmo, economist and professor (died 2019).
- 10 January – Thor Bjarne Bore, newspaper editor and politician (died 2019).
- 13 January – Kåre Rønnes, soccer player and coach
- 16 January – Helga Hernes, political scientist, diplomat and politician.
- 18 January – Rolf Ketil Bjørn, businessperson and politician (died 2008).
- 19 January – Anne Karin Elstad, author (died 2012).
- 23 January – Kari Buen, sculptor (died 2025).

=== February ===
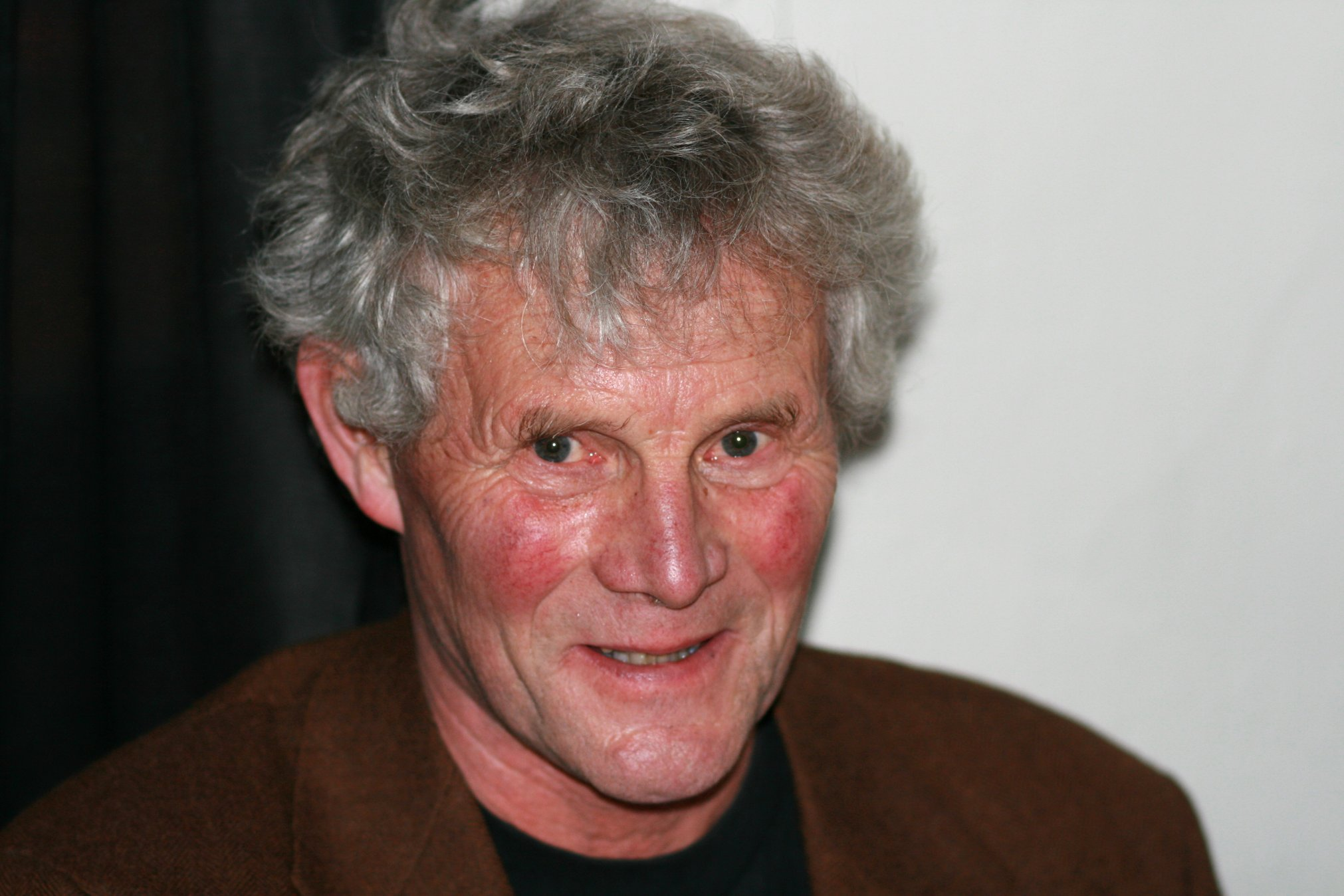
Tor Obrestad

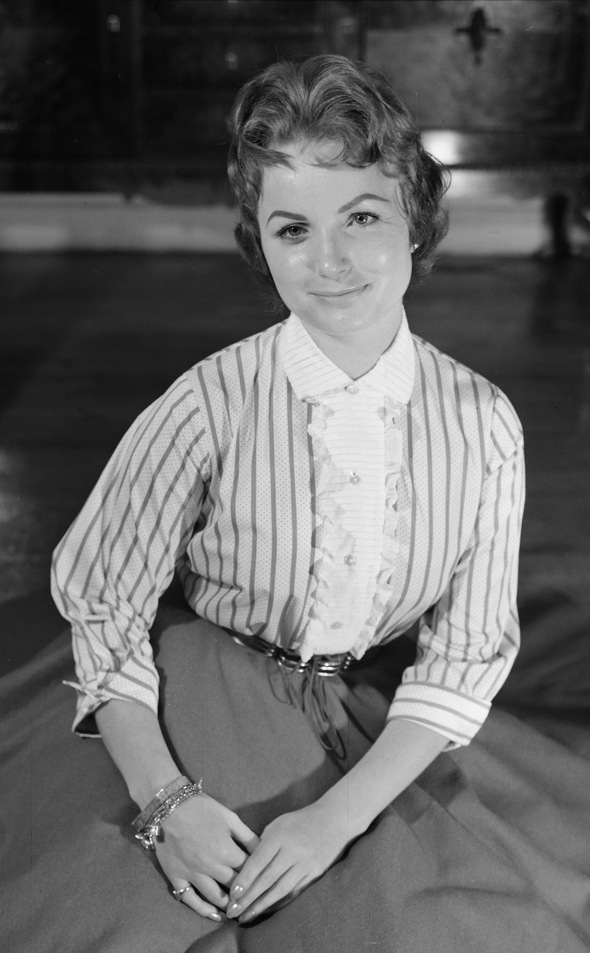
Anita Thallaug

- 1 February – Kjell Henriksen, scientist (died 1996)
- 10 February –
  - Raphael Høegh-Krohn, mathematician (died 1988).
  - Per Norvik, journalist and editor.
- 12 February – Tor Obrestad, novelist, poet and documentary writer (died 2020).
- 14 February – Anita Thallaug, actress and singer (died 2023).
- 20 February – Inge Lønning, theologian, educator and politician (died 2013).
- 24 February – Kristian Rambjør, businessman (died 2015).
- 27 February –
  - Marie Brenden, educator and politician (died 2012).
  - Sverre Olaf Lie, pediatrician. (died 2023)

=== March ===
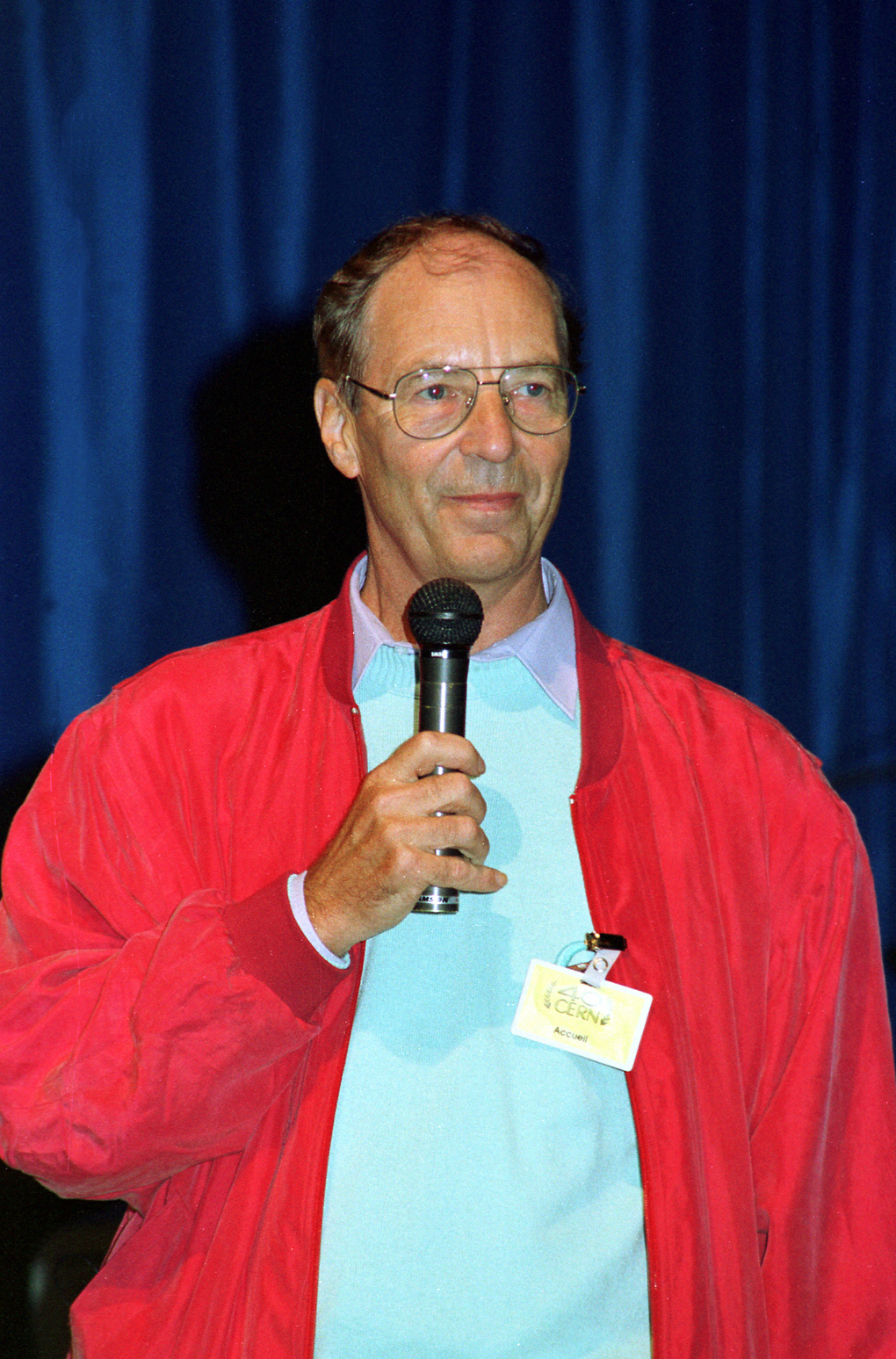
Egil Lillestøl

- 4 March – Magnar Lundemo, cross-country skier and track and field athlete (died 1987).
- 19 March
  - Egil Lillestøl, physicist. (died 2021)
  - Marit Løvvig, politician.
- 23 March – Berit Kullander, actress, dancer, and singer.
- 25 March – Kaare Aksnes, astrophysicist.
- 29 March –
  - Arne Lanes, weightlifter.
  - Knut Mørkved, diplomat (died 2017).

=== April ===
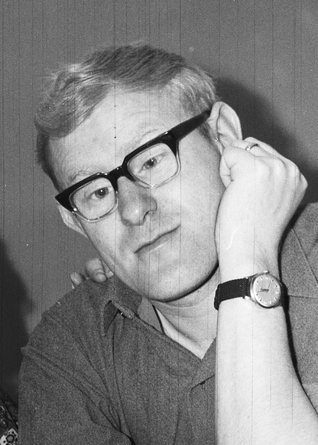
Ivar Medaas

- 4 April – Marit Økern, orienteering competitor.
- 5 April – Åge Storhaug, gymnast (died 2012).
- 6 April –
  - Arne Solli, general (died 2017).
  - Janken Varden, stage director (died 2026).
- 7 April – Oddbjørn Engvold, astronomer.
- 9 April – Ivar Medaas, musician (died 2005).
- 11 April – Hans Jacob Hansteen, architect.
- 12 April – Rolf Bendiksen, politician.
- 20 April – Tor Richter, sports shooter (died 2010).
- 23 April – Kåre Kivijärvi, photographer (died 1991).
- 27 April – Rolf Olsen, sprint canoer.

=== May ===
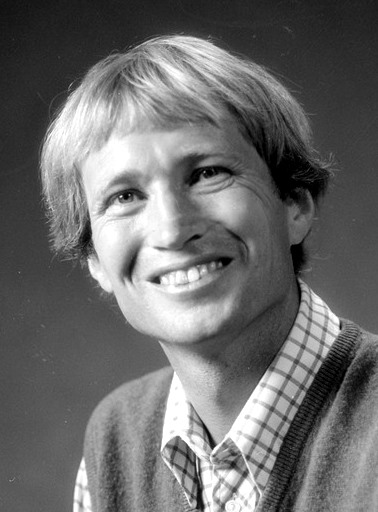
Karsten Alnæs

- 4 May – Birgit Brock-Utne, educator.
- 8 May – Lucie Paus Falck, politician.
- 20 May – Lars Walløe, scientist.
- 22 May – Ulf Sand, civil servant and politician (died 2014).
- 23 May – Ole Herman Fisknes, jurist and civil servant
- 26 May – Inger Lise Gjørv, politician (died 2009).
- 29 May
  - Karsten Alnæs, historian, writer and journalist.
  - Jan Gulbrandsen, hurdler, politician and sports official (died 2007).
  - Ove Liavaag, civil servant (died 2007).

=== June ===
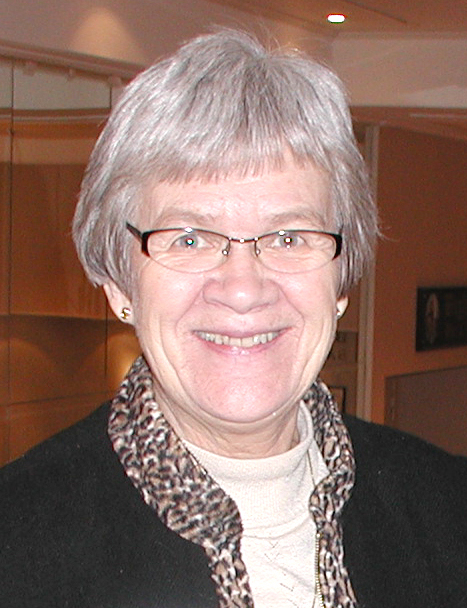
Marit Tingelstad

- 3 June
  - Turid Dørumsgaard Varsi, politician.
  - Thor Listau, politician (died 2014).
- 15 June – Roger Gudmundseth, politician.
- 16 June – Reidar Nielsen, newspaper editor and politician (died 2018).
- 18 June – Marit Tingelstad, politician.
- 23 June –
  - Unn Aarrestad, politician.
  - Martin Stavrum, politician. (died 2022)

=== July ===
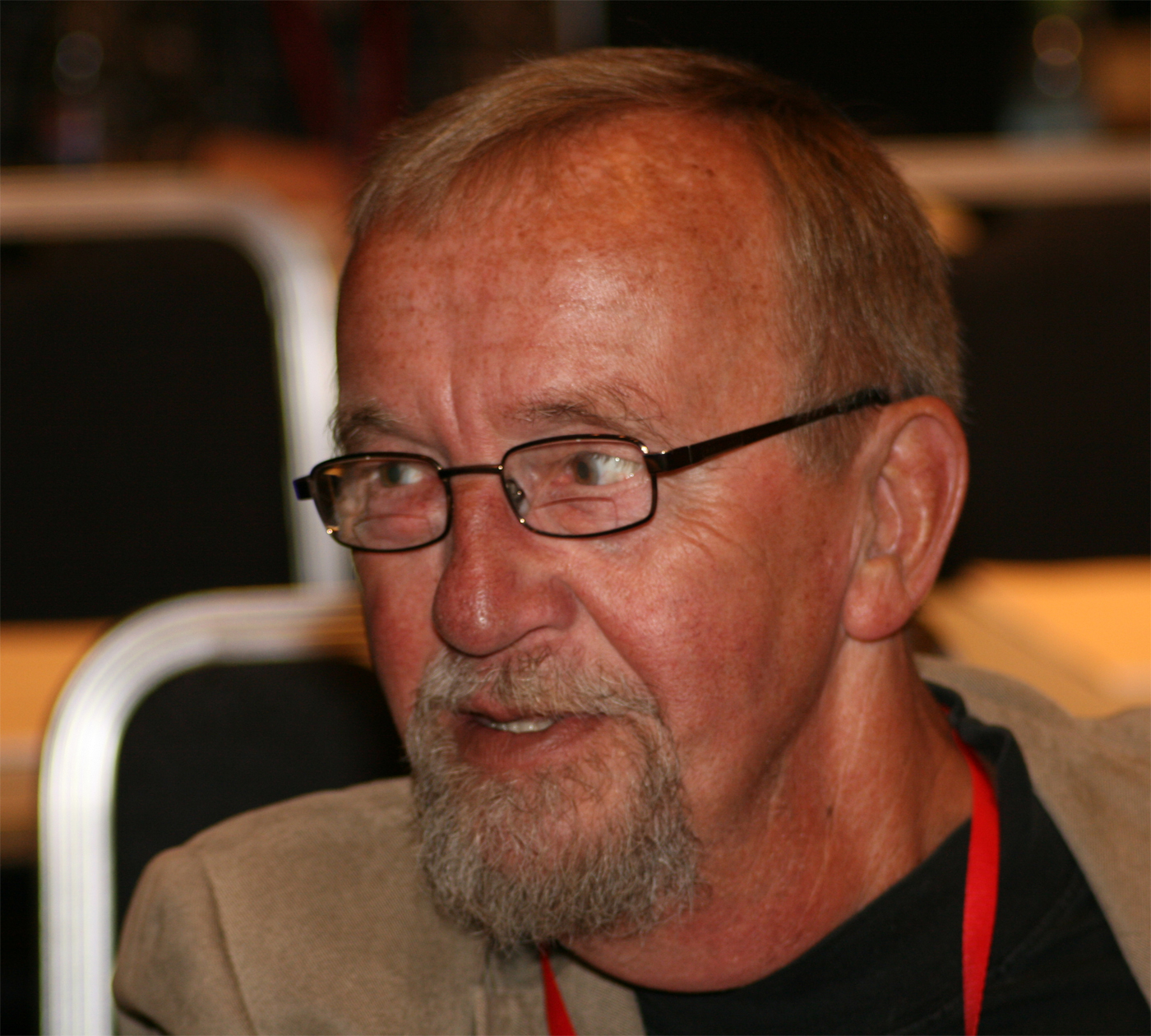
Yngve Hågensen

- 7 July – Trygve Henrik Hoff, singer, composer, songwriter, and writer (died 1987).
- 10 July – Jostein Nerbøvik, historian (died 2004)
- 13 July – Yngve Hågensen, trade union leader (died 2023)
- 18 July – Bjørn Myhre, archaeologist (died 2015).
- 21 July – Willy Martinussen, sociologist.
- 30 July – Kate Næss, poet (died 1987).

=== August ===
- 6 August – Tone Vigeland, goldsmith (died 2024).
- 10 August – Erling Steineide, cross-country skier (died 2019).
- 18 August – Arvid Torgeir Lie, writer (died 2020).
- 25 August – Ruth Lilian Brekke, politician

=== September ===
- 8 September – Olav Dalsøren, ice hockey player.
- 10 September – Eva Birkeland, civil servant.
- 11 September – Sondre Bratland, folk singer.
- 13 September – Guttorm Guttormsgaard, visual artist (died 2019).
- 18 September – Lars Gunnar Lie, politician

=== October ===
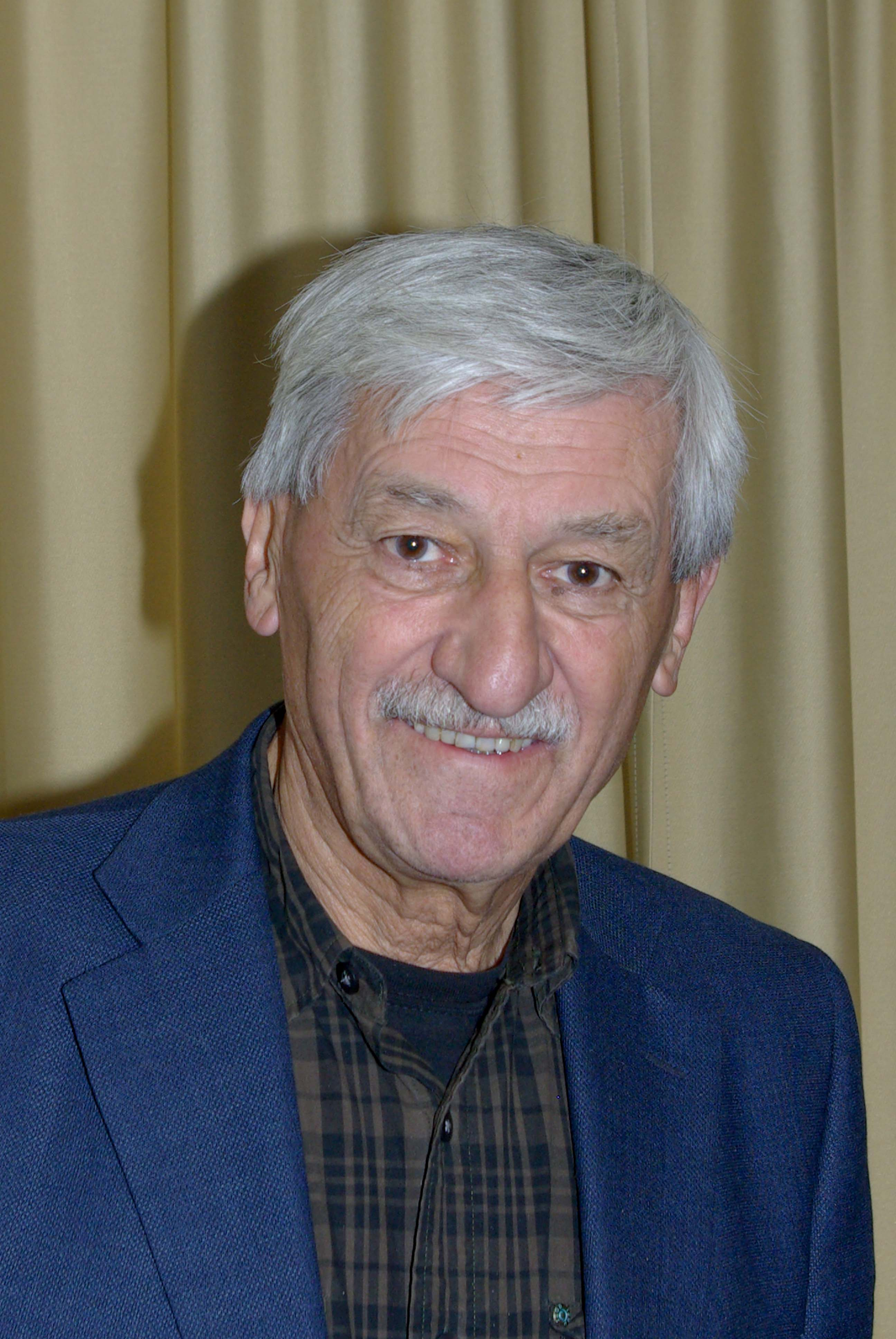
Bjørn Hansen

- 2 October – Kjell Bartholdsen, jazz musician (died 2009).
- 11 October – Arvid Jacobsen, newspaper editor (died 2014)
- 12 October – Kari Rolfsen, sculptor and illustrator (died 2020).
- 12 October – Bjørn Hansen, news presenter and correspondent
- 14 October – Terje Bergstad, painter and printmaker (died 2014).
- 27 October – Jan Martin Larsen, cartographer, orienteer and politician
- 31 October –
  - Egil Ly, sailor.
  - Magnar Mangersnes, organist and choral conductor. (died 2023)

=== November ===
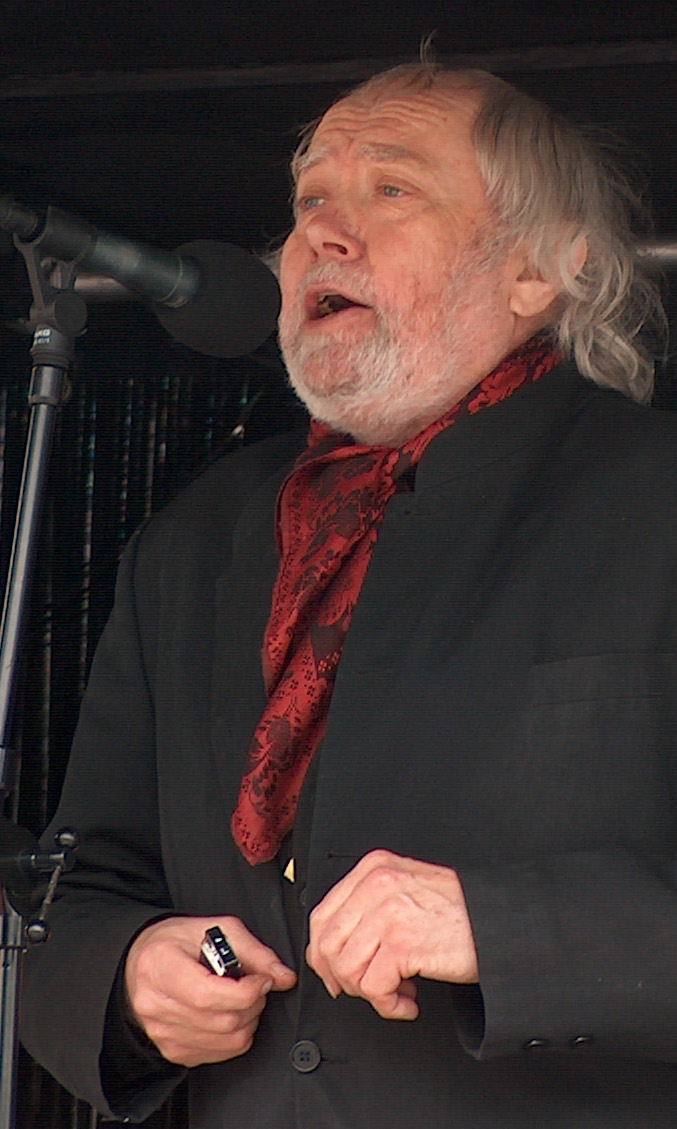
Oddvar Torsheim

- 2 November – Oddvar Torsheim, visual artist, poet and musician.
- 9 November –
  - Tove Stang Dahl, legal scholar (died 1993).
  - Dag Østerberg, sociologist, philosopher and musicologist (died 2017).
- 11 November – Fredrik Heffermehl, jurist, writer and translator
- 15 November – Aril Edvardsen, evangelical preacher and missionary (died 2008)
- 23 November – Arvid Vatle, physician
- 27 November – Ragnar Tveiten, biathlete and double World Champion.
- 29 November – Kjartan Rødland, journalist, newspaper editor and author (died 2025).

=== December ===
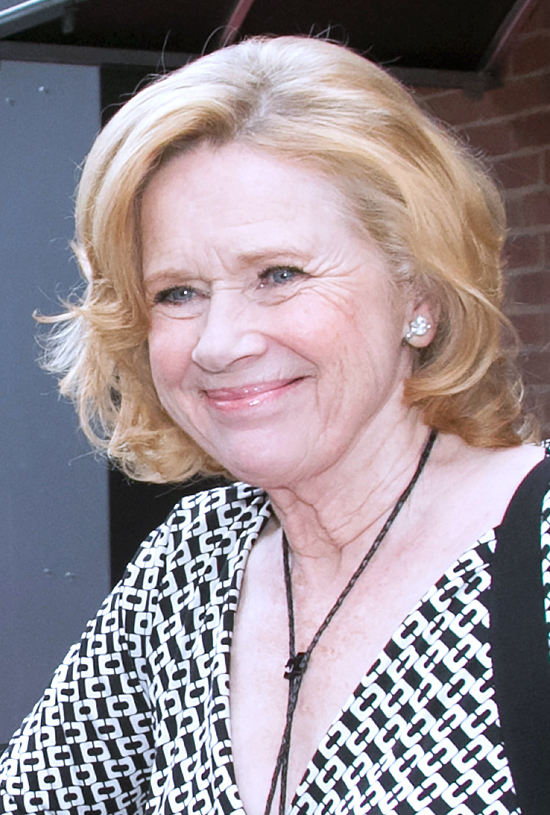
Liv Ullmann

- 2 December – Reidar Grønhaug, social anthropologist (died 2005)
- 5 December – Aud Dalseg, interior architect.
- 9 December – Astrid Marie Nistad, politician
- 11 December – Asbjørn Bjørnset, politician
- 15 December – Fred Anton Maier, speed skater (died 2015).
- 16 December – Liv Ullmann, actress.
- 25 December – Finn Graff, illustrator.
- 27 December – Oddvar Nes, linguist (died 2016)

=== Full date unknown ===
- Geir Grung, diplomat (died 2005)

== Notable deaths ==
- 3 January – Ludvig Meyer, barrister, newspaper editor and politician (born 1861)
- 7 January – Oluf Christian Müller, politician (born 1876)
- 8 January – Nils Riddervold Jensen, politician and Minister (born 1863)
- 9 February – Axel Paulsen, speed skater and figure skater (born 1855)
- 21 March – Jacob Opdahl, gymnast and Olympic gold medallist (born 1894)
- 25 March – Edvard Hagerup Bull, judge and politician (born 1855)
- 16 June – Torolf Prytz, architect, goldsmith and politician (born 1858)
- 28 July – Johan Fahlstrøm, actor and theatre manager (born 1867)
- 15 September – Adolph Gundersen, Norwegian American medical doctor (born 1865)
- 18 September – Erik Rotheim, chemical engineer and inventor of the aerosol spray can (born 1898)
- 25 September – Paul Olaf Bodding, missionary, linguist and folklorist (born 1865)
- 16 October – Nils Yngvar Ustvedt, medical doctor and politician (born 1868)
- 23 November – Erik Werenskiold, painter and illustrator (born 1855)
- 4 December – Borghild Holmsen, pianist, composer and music critic (born 1865)
- 11 December – Christian Lous Lange, historian, political scientist and Nobel Peace Prize laureate (born 1869)
- 12 December – Holger Sinding-Larsen, architect (born 1869)
- 14 December – Sven Moren, writer (born 1871).

=== Full date unknown ===
- Gunnar Olavsson Helland, Hardanger fiddle maker (born 1852)
- Jakob Sverdrup, philologist and lexicographer (born 1881)
