= Oddvar =

Oddvar is a given name. Notable people with the given name include:

- Oddvar Barlie (1929–2017), Norwegian sport wrestler
- Oddvar Berrefjord (1918-1999), Norwegian jurist and politician
- Oddvar Brå (born 1951), Norwegian former cross-country skier
- Oddvar Einarson (born 1949), Norwegian movie director
- Oddvar Flæte (born 1944), Norwegian politician and civil servant
- Oddvar Hansen (1921–2011), Norwegian footballer and coach
- Oddvar Igland (born 1963), Norwegian politician
- Oddvar Klepperås, Norwegian handball player
- Oddvar Nes (1938–2016), Norwegian linguist
- Oddvar Wenner Nilssen (1920–1979), Norwegian sports shooter
- Oddvar Reiakvam (born 1985), Norwegian politician
- Oddvar Rønnestad (1935–2014), Norwegian alpine skier
- Oddvar Saga (1934–2000), Norwegian ski jumper
- Oddvar Sponberg (1914–1975), Norwegian race walker
- Oddvar Stenstrøm (born 1946), Norwegian journalist and television host
- Oddvar Torsheim (born 1938), Norwegian painter, illustrator and musician
- Oddvar Bull Tuhus (born 1940), Norwegian film director and screenwriter
- Oddvar Vormeland (1924–2013), Norwegian educationalist and civil servant
