= Garbo =

Garbo may refer to:

== People ==
- Greta Garbo (1905–1990), Swedish actress
- Gunnar Garbo (1924–2016), Norwegian journalist and politician
- Ingvald Garbo (1891–1941), member of the Norwegian Resistance in WWII
- Norman Garbo (1919–2017), American author, lecturer and painter
- Raffaellino del Garbo (1466), Florentine painter
- Juan Pujol García (1912–1988), codename "Garbo", Spanish double agent for the British
- Garbo (singer) (Renato Abate, born 1958), Italian singer
- Greg Garbowsky (born 1986), known as Garbo, American musician

== Places ==
- Għarb, Gozo, Malta
- Garbo, Tibet

== Arts and entertainment ==
- Garbo (film), a 1992 Australian comedy
- Garbo (2005 film), a documentary about Greta Garbo by Kevin Brownlow
- Garbo, a fictional character in American TV drama Dirt

== Other uses ==
- "Garbo", Australian slang for a waste collector
- Garbo (Puerto Vallarta), a bar in Puerto Vallarta, Mexico
- Garba (dance), also spelled garbo, an Indian folk dance

== See also ==
- Garba (disambiguation)
