= Garba (given name) =

- Gender: Male
- Language: Hausa

Origin
- Origin: Nigeria
- Meaning: southernmost prophet Muhammad's companion
- Region of origin: Northern, Nigeria

Garba is a Nigerian male given name and surname predominantly used among Muslims, particularly within the Hausa community. Garba or Garuba is from Arabic word "al-garb" meaning southernmost prophet Muhammad's companion, Abubakar was buried on the southernmost side of the prophet.

== Notable individuals with the name ==
- Garba Duba (born 1942), Nigerian Governor of Bauchi State
- Garba Gashuwa (born 1957), Nigerian Hausa poet
- Garba Lame (born 1968), Nigerian wrestler
- Garba Lawal (born 1974), Nigerian footballer
- Garba Lompo, Nigerien Minister of Justice in Niger
- Garba Mohammed (1944–2021), Nigerian Governor of Sokoto State
- Garba Ali Mohammed (born 1949), Nigerian Governor of Niger State
- Garba Nadama (1938–2020), Nigerian Governor of Sokoto State
- Garba Shehu (born 1959), Nigerian journalist and politician
- Garba Yakubu Lado (born 1961), Nigerian businessman and politician

== See also ==
- Garba (disambiguation)
