= Aksnes =

Aksnes may refer to:

- Aurora Aksnes, a Norwegian singer
- Kaare Aksnes, a Norwegian astronomer
- 2067 Aksnes, a minor planet named for him
- Aksnes, Rogaland, a geographical location on Mainland-Karmøy
