= Garba =

Garba may refer to:

- Garba (dance), a form of dance originating from Gujarat, India

== People ==
- Garba (given name), list of people
- Ahmed Garba (born 1980), Nigerian football striker
- Bala Garba (born 1974), Nigerian football coach
- Binta Masi Garba (born 1967), Nigerian politician and businesswoman
- Hamsou Garba (born 1958), Nigerien singer
- Harouna Garba (born 1986), Nigerian track hurdler
- Ibrahim Garba, Nigerian university vice-chancellor
- Idris Garba (born 1947), military governor of Kano State, Nigeria
- Issoufou Boubacar Garba (born 1990), Nigerien football player
- Joseph Nanven Garba (1943–2002), Nigerian Foreign Minister, President of the United Nations General Assembly
- Manu Garba (born 1965), Nigerian football manager
- Mario Garba (born 1977), Croatian football player
- Rufai Garba, military governor of Anambra State, Nigeria
- Sam Garba (1948–1978), Nigerian football player
- Seyni Garba, Nigerien army general
- Yohannan Garba (fl. 691–693), anti-patriarch of the Church of the East

== Places ==
- Garba, Central African Republic
- Garba, Sichuan
- Garba, the Hungarian name for Gurba village, Șicula Commune, Arad County, Romania
- Garba Chowk, a square in Bhat, Daskroi, Gujarat
- Garba (see), a Roman Catholic titular bishopric in modern Algeria

== See also ==
- Garbha (disambiguation)
- Garbo (disambiguation)
