= Oddbjørn =

The given name Oddbjørn or Odd-Bjørn is a given name. Notable people with the name include:

- Oddbjørn Engvold (born 1938), Norwegian astronomer
- Odd-Bjørn Fure (born 1942), Norwegian historian and political scientist
- Oddbjørn Hågård (1940–2013), Norwegian politician for the Centre Party
- Oddbjørn Hagen (1908–1983), Norwegian skier who competed in Nordic combined and cross-country skiing
- Odd-Bjørn Hjelmeset (born 1971), Norwegian cross-country skier who has competed since 1993
- Oddbjørn Nordset (born 1946), Norwegian civil servant and politician for the Centre Party
- Oddbjørn Snøfugl (born 1941), Norwegian politician for the Centre Party
- Oddbjørn Sverre Langlo (1935–2004), Norwegian politician for the Conservative Party
- Oddbjørn Vatne (born 1948), Norwegian politician for the Centre Party
