= Håvard Narum =

Norwegian journalist and author (born 1944)

- Born: 23 June 1944 (age 81); Hov, Norway
- Occupation: Journalist

Håvard Narum (born 23 June 1944) is a Norwegian journalist and author.

== Biography ==
Born in Hov, Norway, Narum has degrees in political science, history and English from the University of Oslo. He started his career in journalism at Oppland Arbeiderblad in 1964, joining the Norwegian News Agency in 1969.

Narum joined the Norwegian Broadcasting Corporation in 1975, where he headed the international newsroom at Dagsnytt from 1984 to 1987. From 1987 to 1991 Narum was a news correspondent for the Norwegian Broadcasting Corporation in Washington, D.C. Returning to Norway, Narum headed the political newsroom at Dagsnytt from 1991 to 1997.

In 1997, Narum joined Aftenposten, where he worked as head of the political newsroom (1997-2000), and acting political editor (2000). Since 2000, Narum was a political commentator and editorial writer at Aftenposten. In a 2009 survey conducted by Journalisten among a bi-partisan selection of Norwegian political party leaders, Narum was tied with Trine Eilertsen as the best political commentator in Norway. He is often referred to as the "grand old man" of political commentary in Norway.

Narum retired from Aftenposten in September 2012. His retirement ceremony was attended by Jens Stoltenberg, then Prime Minister of Norway, who made a surprise speech. Following his retirement from journalism, Narum was recruited by Julie Brodtkorb as a communications consultant at JKL Group, becoming a colleague of Göran Persson. He has maintained his participation in public affairs as a freelance writer and public speaker.

Media offices
Preceded by Per Norvik	Acting Political Editor at Aftenposten; 2000	Succeeded by Harald Stanghelle
Preceded by Oddvar Stenstrøm	Correspondent of NRK in Washington, DC; 1987–1991	Succeeded by Bjørn Hansen
