= Godspower Oboido =

Nigerian poet and activist (born 1988)

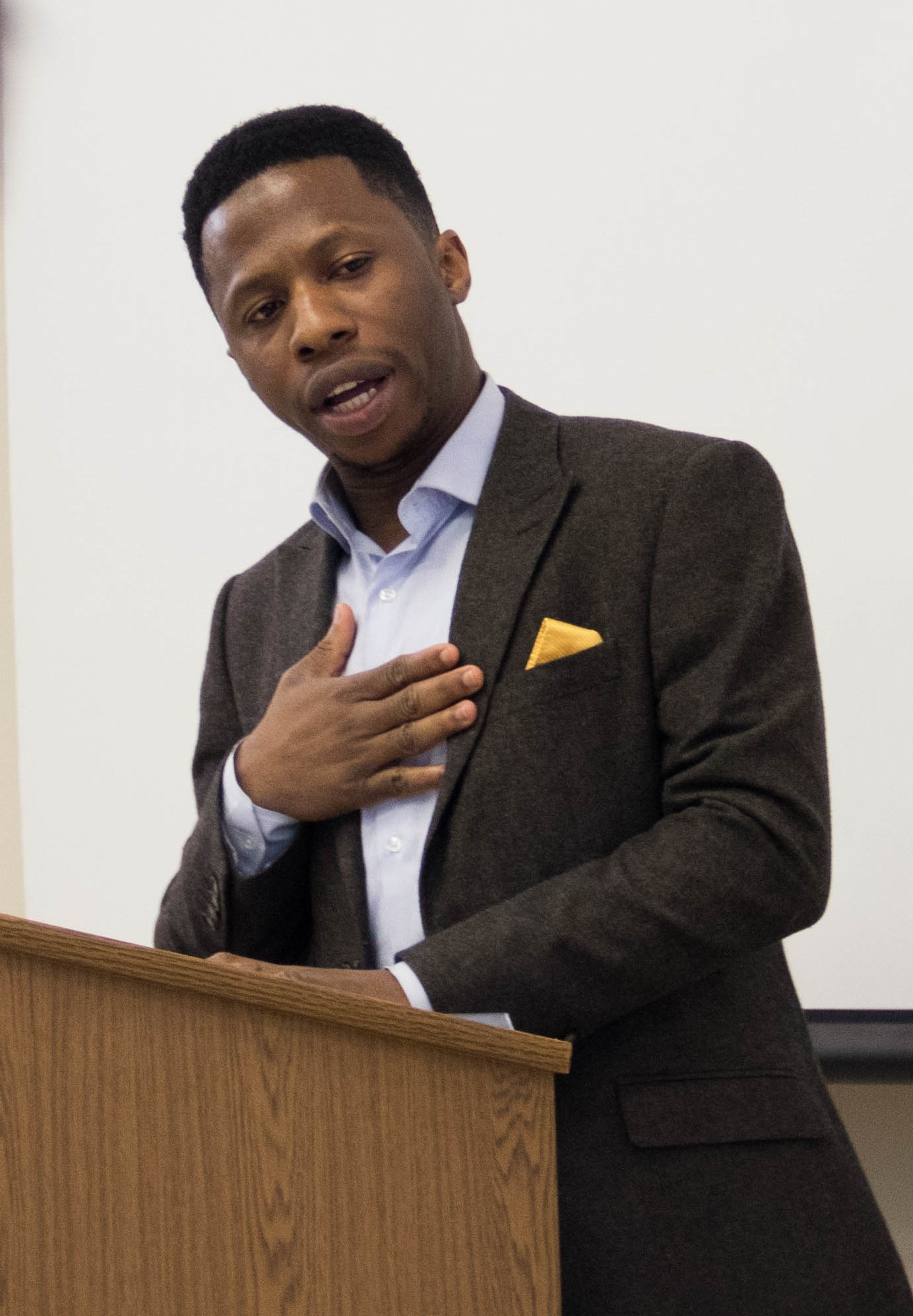
- Godspower Oboido at a Public Book Reading in Tulsa, Oklahoma
- Citizenship: Nigerian
- Occupation: Poet
- Writing career
- Language: English
- Years active: 2005 – present
- Notable work: Wandering Feet on Pebbled Shores
- Notable awards: The Future Awards Africa Queen's Young Leader Award

Godspower Oboido (born 10 November 1988) is a Nigerian poet and Christian preacher. His poetic voice has been compared to that of Christopher Okigbo and Leopold Senghor, two all-time leading figures of African poetry and influences that mark Oboido's style of poetry.

== Biography ==
=== Early life ===
The last child of his parents, Godspower Oboido was born in Benin City, Edo State, Nigeria. He completed his primary school education in Benin City and went to High Schools in Benin City and Iyede, a small town in Delta State.

== Career ==
=== Literary career ===
Godspower Oboido began writing in Lagos after an unsuccessful attempt to pursue a film career. In the beginning, he wrote many screenplays and stage plays, including "Shut Up and Sit Down" which he self-published. He returned to Benin City where he started writing poetry. He said he had a longing to paint with words and slowly deviated from visual art.

In 2014, Oboido's first book of poetry, Songs of a Chicken Bone was released in Canada by Nsemia Publishers.

The poet has been published in The Istanbul Review, Saraba Magazine, African writer, Nathaniel Turner, The Star, and elsewhere. In an article on National Mirror Newspaper, the poet was named alongside seven other writers, as the future of Nigerian Literature.

=== Songs of a Chicken Bone ===
Songs of a Chicken Bone, a collection of Oboido's poems, is the poet's first full length poetry book and first book of his to be published traditionally. It was well received in the literary circle. British poet and literary publisher, Chris Emery, author of The Departure and other books, described Oboido's book as "spirited and engaged with the world". Poet, playwright and theatre director, Peter Harvey also wrote that Oboido "has been blessed with wide experience and with the grace to be true to his roots."

Wandering Feet on Pebbled Shores

Oboido's second poetry collection, Wandering Feet on Pebbled Shores, was released in August 2017 by Lamar Literary Press (Beaumont, Texas). In Wandering Feet on Pebbled Shores, Oboido sings of and powerfully negotiates the Africa that is alive and strong alongside the new world where “the traveler washes his migrant feet / with the wetness of dawn” and where “the road has mouth like a boa.”

=== Talks ===
The poet has given talks, read his poems and papers at various literary festivals and events at universities and institutions of learning around the world.

== Awards ==
Godspower Oboido is a 2016 Highly commended runner-up in the Queens Young Leaders Award from Her Majesty Queen Elizabeth II. Also, In 2010, he was a finalist in the Future Nigeria Awards, making the list of 100 of the brightest and best Nigerians under the age of 30.
