= Garbha =

Garbha may refer to:

- Womb, or new life through pregnancy in Sanskrit
- Garbha Superfast Express, a superfast train running between Gandhidham and Howrah Junction
- Garbhagriha, the small unit shrine of a Hindu temple
- Garba (dance) or garbha, an Indian folk dance

== See also ==
- Garba (disambiguation)
