= Gunnar Aksnes =

Norwegian chemist and poet

- Born: 8 August 1926; Kvam Municipality, Hardanger, Norway
- Died: 31 January 2010 (aged 83); Bergen Municipality, Hordaland, Norway
- Spouse: Milly Aksnes
- Scientific career
- Fields: Organic chemist
- Institutions: University of Bergen; Forsvarets Forskningsinstitutt

Gunnar Aksnes (8 August 1926 in Kvam, Hardanger – 31 January 2010 in Bergen, Hordaland) was a Norwegian chemist and poet, the brother of the astronomer Kaare Aksnes, married to Milly Aksnes (b. 1928)

== Career ==
Aksnes started his studies in 1945 at the University of Oslo where he completed Mag.Scient exam in 1951. He was then employed by the Norwegian Forsvarets Forskningsinstitutt (FFI), and where he worked with problem related to chemical warfare agent until 1960. Then turning his Heimatt to the West Coast, to assistant professor of organic chemistry at the Department of Chemistry at the University of Bergen (UiB). In 1962 Aksnes defended his Dr.Philos. degree, and was appointed Professor of Organic Chemistry at the UiB in 1966, a position he filled with relish until he resigned in August 1993. Some years after this he was still active at the Department of Chemistrywith holding a senior scholarship from 'Norges Allmennvitenskapelige Forskningsråd' (NAVF).

His academic interests ranged wide. Through his work on nerve gases at FFI he was attracted to the phosphorus chemistry. This was his major research field in which he published articles through the years, including many important scientific works that made his name well known in the scientific community world wide. In the late 1970s he started to work with chemical problems connected to environmental issues. As one of the first chemists in Norway, he recognized the importance of inter-disciplinary cooperation when scientists work on solving multi-disciplinary problems. He took a strong interest in NAVF major Research program on marine pollution and built up a team of specialists in oil chemistry at the University of Bergen, together with younger employees. Later he focused on pollution of lakes, and here his knowledge of chemistry came to its right, when he extracted new knowledge from the previously published data.

Aksnes was a popular lecturer, and all his students at the basic course in organic chemistry remember his loudly, involved explanations about organic molecule that moves and reacts. As a student mentor, he was always interested in the work of the students, and he asked critical questions that helped developing critical thinking and expanded the mind of the student. He also raised critical questions in popular scientific articles in professional magazines, the last concerning the mercury of the German U-boat in the fjord off Fedje. Through articles and interviews in the press, and through several popular books on environmental issues for nonscientists, he showed his engagement throughout his lifetime. He served in several administrative tasks, not only on at the Faculty of Mathematics and Natural Sciences (Dean 1969-72) and head of the Chemical institute (1991–93) at UiB, but also as a member of Council of Natural Sciences at NAVF (1970–76, as leader 1970–71).

Aksnes also wrote poems, and in 2001 he published the book Med penn og pensel i Hardanger (With pen and brush in Hardanger) with the publisher 'Hardangerforlaget' in Øystese. The book was richly illustrated by his wife Milly Aksnes. The poems in the book were written in the period from 1970 to 2001, and the illustrations are inspired by the scenery of Hardanger.
