= Hov, Norway =

Village in Søndre Land, Norway

Hov
- Village
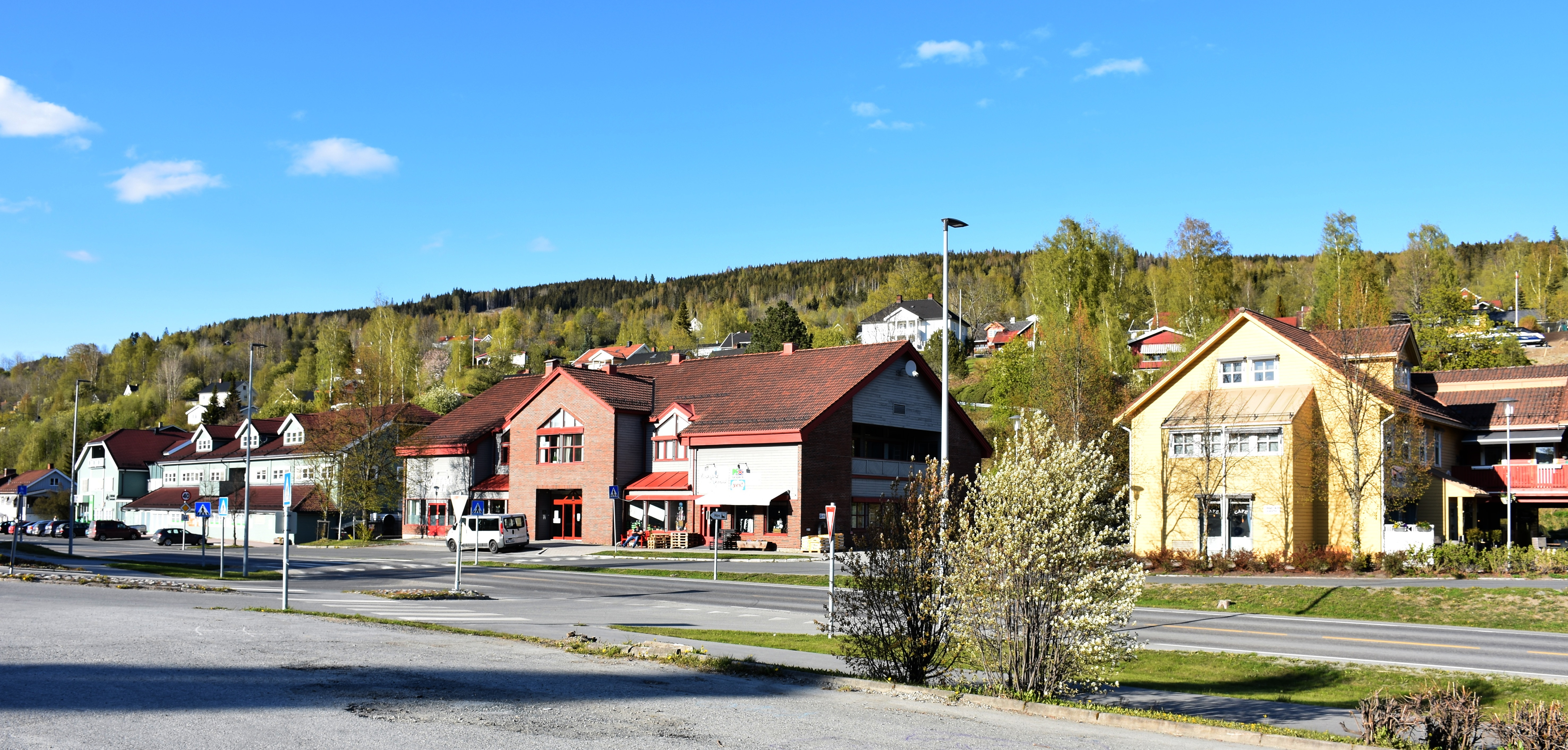
- View of the village
- Interactive map of Hov
- Location within Innlandet Location within Norway
- Coordinates: 60.6987°N 10.35193°E
- Country: Norway
- Region: Eastern Norway
- County: Innlandet
- District: Land
- Municipality: Søndre Land Municipality

Area
  - Total: 2.28 km^{2} (0.88 sq mi)
- Elevation: 200 m (660 ft)

Population (2024)
  - Total: 2,132
  - Density: 935/km^{2} (2,420/sq mi)
- Time zone: UTC+01:00 (CET)
  - Summer (DST): UTC+02:00 (CEST)
- Post Code: 2860 Hov

Hov is the administrative centre of Søndre Land Municipality in Innlandet county, Norway. The village is located in the traditional region of Land, along the east shore of the large Randsfjorden where the Norwegian county roads 34 and 247 meet. Hov lies about 30 kilometres (19 mi) to the southwest of the town of Gjøvik.

The 2.28-square-kilometre (560-acre) village has a population (2024) of 2,132 and a population density of 935 inhabitants per square kilometre (2,420/sq mi).

Hov was located along the Valdresbanen railway line. The railway connected the Gjøvikbanen railway line at Eina with the town of Fagernes in the district of Valdres. The railroad had passenger traffic from 1902 to 1988 when it was closed down.

Hov Church (Norwegian: Hov kirke) is a cruciform style church dating from 1781 that is located in Hov.

== Notable people ==
- Finn Thrana (1958–2006), a lawyer
- Ola Skjølaas (1941-2006), a politician
- Håvard Narum (born 1944), a journalist
