= Kate Næss =

Norwegian poet and translator (1938–1987)

- Born: 30 July 1938; Oslo, Norway
- Died: 15 July 1987 (aged 48)
- Occupations: Poet; Translator

Kate Næss (30 July 1938 – 15 July 1987) was a Norwegian poet and translator. She was born in Oslo, and was married to theatre director Janken Varden. She made her literary debut in 1962 with the poetry collection Billedskrift. Later collections were Mørkerommet from 1964 and Blindgjengere from 1969. She was among the pioneers of Club 7 in Oslo, and is credited for inventing the name of the club. Poet Jan Erik Vold has labeled her the "secret queen of the sixties".
