= Ivar Medaas =

Norwegian musician

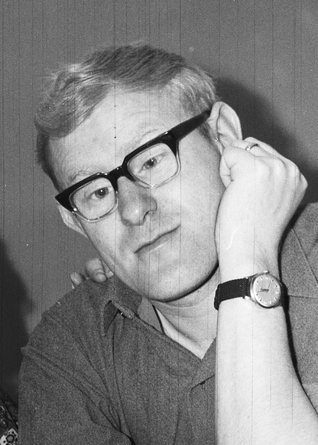
- Ivar Medaas in 1965

Background information
- Birth name: Ivan Medaas
- Born: 9 April 1938
- Origin: Norway
- Died: 7 January 2005 (aged 66)
- Genres: Rock, pop, folk
- Occupation(s): Musician, singer-songwriter
- Instrument: Fiddle
- Years active: 1959–2004

Ivar Medaas (April 9, 1938 – January 7, 2005) was a Norwegian folksinger and fiddle player. He is best known for his 1963 song Dar Kjem Dampen written by Ragnvald Hammer.
