= Willy Martinussen =

Norwegian sociologist

Willy Martin Martinussen (born 21 July 1938) is a Norwegian sociologist.

Martinussen was born in Vestvågøy Municipality and graduated from the University of Oslo with a mag.art. degree (PhD equivalent) in 1965. He worked at the Institute for Social Research from 1963 to 1977, and was hired at the University of Trondheim (which was later merged into the Norwegian University of Science and Technology) in 1977. He has edited the journals Tidsskrift for samfunnsforskning from 1972 to 1976 and Sosiologisk tidsskrift from 1993 to 1996. His books include Velgere og politiske frontlinjer (1972, with Henry Valen), Fjerndemokratiet (1973), Solidaritetens grenser (1988), and Sosiologiske forklaringer (1997).
