= Janken Varden =

Norwegian theatre director (1938–2026)

- Born: 6 April 1938; Oslo, Norway
- Died: 3 February 2026 (aged 38); Copenhagen
- Occupations: Theatre director Educator
- Spouse: Kate Næss (m. 1966; died 1987)

Jan Fredrik "Janken" Varden (6 April 1938 – 3 February 2026) was a Norwegian theatre director and educator.

== Life and career ==
Varden was born in Oslo on 6 April 1938. He was graduate of The University of Oslo Law School. In 1966, he married poet Kate Næss (died 1987); from 1989, he lived with Danish actress Birgitte Halling-Koch. He worked as a stage director at Riksteatret - The Norwegian Itinerary Theatre, Nationaltheatret - The National Theatre of Norway, Fjernsynsteatret, - Television Theatre, and many others. Varden headed the Norwegian National Theatre School from 1976 to 1981. He was head of, and first director at, Oslo Nye Teater from 1989 to 1996. He headed the Danish National School of Theatre and Contemporary Dance from 1998 to 2003, and has been decorated Knight of the Danish Order of the Dannebrog. He was decorated Knight, First Class of the Order of St. Olav in 2007.

Varden died in Copenhagen on 3 February 2026, at the age of 87.
