= Ruth Lilian Brekke =

Norwegian politician (born 1938)

Ruth Lilian Brekke (born 25 August 1938) is a Norwegian politician for the Conservative Party.

She served as a deputy representative to the Norwegian Parliament from Akershus during the term 2001–2005.

On the local level Brekke was the mayor of Frogn until 2003.
