= Ingvald Garbo =

Norwegian resistance member (1891–1941)

Ingvald Garbo (3 October 1891 – 22 November 1941) was a Norwegian resistance member.

He was born in Bergen, to a mother from Bergen and a father from Førde. He married Sara Haugland (1897–1977) in 1924, and had two children. His son Gunnar Garbo, born 1924, was a notable politician.

He was a teacher by occupation. He also contributed to newspapers such as Bergens Arbeiderblad. During the occupation of Norway by Nazi Germany he listened to illegal radio broadcasts from the BBC, and distributed the news among German soldiers. He was discovered by the German occupying authorities, arrested on 8 October 1941 and executed on 22 November 1941. He was the first Norwegian with a connection to the illegal press to be executed, and according to Berit Nøkleby's count the seventeenth overall.
