= Bjørn Myhre =

Norwegian archaeologist (1938–2015)

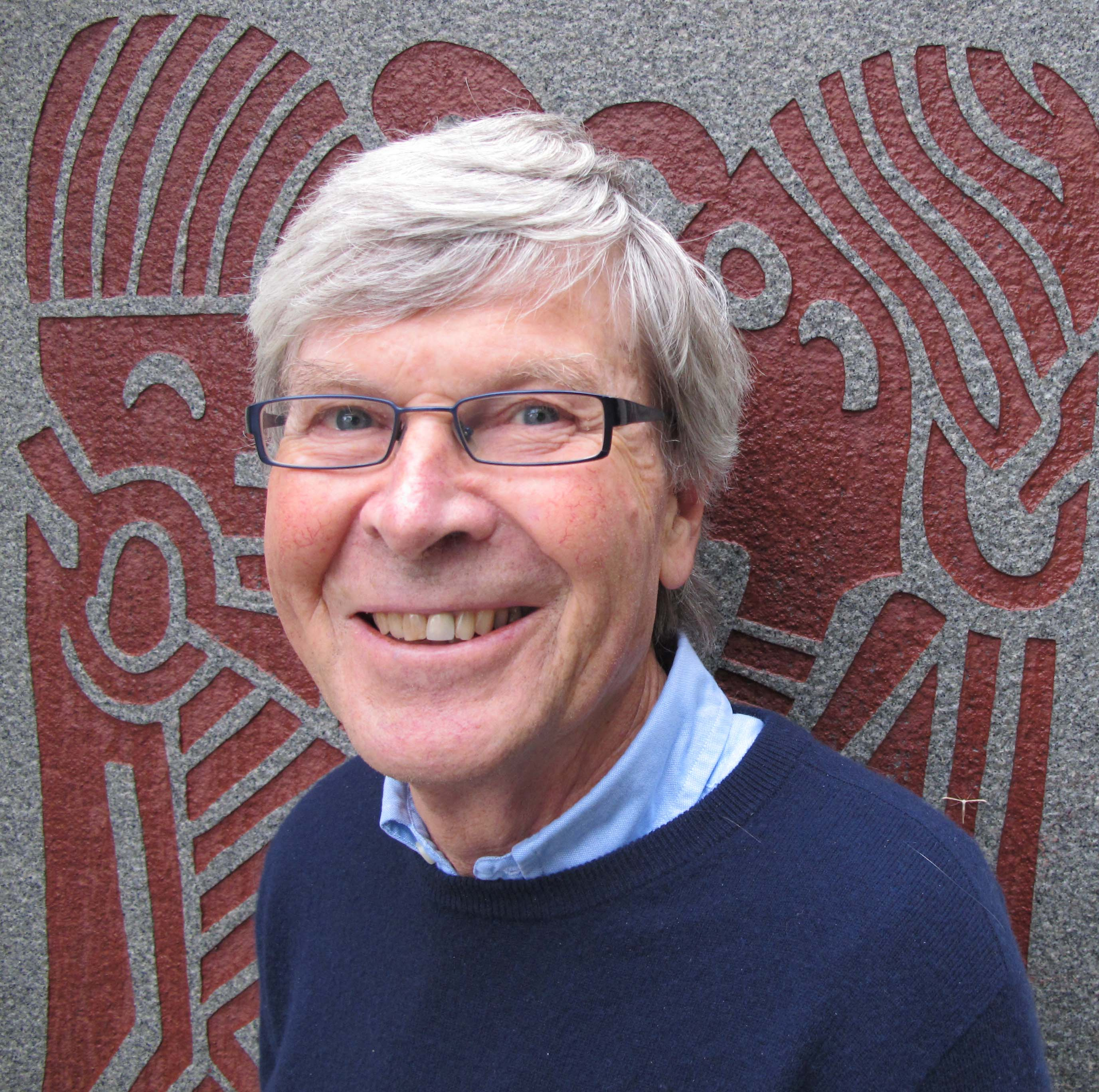
- Myhre in 2010
- Born: 18 July 1938; Time Municipality, Norway
- Died: 28 September 2015 (aged 77)
- Occupation: Archaeologist
- Relatives: Aslak Sira Myhre (nephew)

Bjørn Myhre (18 July 1938 – 28 September 2015) was a Norwegian archaeologist.

He was born in Time Municipality. He was assigned with the Stavanger Museum from 1965 to 1968, and with Historisk Museum at the University of Bergen from 1968 to 1985. He was appointed professor at the University of Oslo from 1985 to 1993, and served as director of Arkeologisk Museum in Stavanger from 1993 to 1998. His books include Jernalderens bosetningshistorie i Høyland fjellbygd from 1972, and Gårdsanlegget på Ullandhaug from 1980. He was a fellow of the Norwegian Academy of Science and Letters.

== Selected publications ==
- Myhre, Bjørn (1992). "The Royal Cemetery at Borre, Vestfold: A Norwegian Centre in a European Periphery". In Carver, Martin (ed.). The Age of Sutton Hoo: The seventh century in north-western Europe. Woodbridge: The Boydell Press. pp. 301–313. ISBN 0-85115-330-5.
