= Garuba =

- Gender: Male
- Language: Hausa

Origin
- Origin: Nigerian
- Meaning: southernmost side of the prophet
- Region of origin: Northern, Nigeria

pronunciation

Garuba is a Nigerian male given name and surname predominantly used among Muslims, particularly within the Hausa community. Garuba or Garba is from Arabic word "al-garb" meaning southernmost prophet Muhammad's companion, Abubakar was buried on the southernmost side of the prophet. This name Garuba/Garba is always attached to anyone with the name Abu bakr or Abubakar.

== Notable individuals with the name ==
- Chris Abutu Garuba (1948), Nigerian military governor.
- Usman Garuba (born 2002), Nigerian Spanish professional basketball player.
- Harry Garuba (1958 – 2020), Nigerian-born writer of poetry and a professor.
