= Hans Jacob Hansteen =

Norwegian architect (born 1938)

Hans Jacob Hansteen (born 11 April 1938) is a Norwegian architect.

Born in Stavanger, he graduated from the Norwegian Institute of Technology in 1961 and worked as a professor there from 1977 to 1995. From 1993 to 2003 he was chief inspector of historic buildings in Oslo. He is a board member of the Norwegian Institute for Cultural Heritage Research.
