= Oddvar Igland =

Norwegian politician (born 1963)

Deputy Member of the Norwegian Parliament
- Incumbent
- Assumed office 11 September 2017
- Constituency: Akershus

Personal details
- Born: 22 November 1963 (age 62)
- Party: Centre Party

Oddvar Igland (born 22 November 1963) is a Norwegian politician for the Centre Party.

He served as a deputy representative to the Parliament of Norway from Akershus during the term 2017–2021. He resides in Asker.
