= 2067 Aksnes =

Hildian asteroid

Discovery
- Discovered by: Y. Väisälä
- Discovery site: Turku Obs.
- Discovery date: 23 February 1936

Designations
- Named after: Kaare Aksnes (Norwegian astronomer)
- Alternative designations: 1936 DD · 1951 AG; 1965 UV · 1971 QH_{2} 1973 UR_{2} · 1975 BD_{1}
- Minor planet category: main-belt · Hilda

Orbital characteristics
- Epoch 4 September 2017 (JD 2458000.5)
- Uncertainty parameter 0
- Observation arc: 81.03 yr (29,596 days)
- Aphelion: 4.6834 AU
- Perihelion: 3.2440 AU
- Semi-major axis: 3.9637 AU
- Eccentricity: 0.1816
- Orbital period (sidereal): 7.89 yr (2,882 days)
- Mean anomaly: 191.29°
- Mean motion: 0° 7^{m} 29.64^{s} / day
- Inclination: 3.0798°
- Longitude of ascending node: 150.24°
- Argument of perihelion: 297.33°
- Jupiter MOID: 0.5866 AU
- T_{Jupiter}: 3.0270

Physical characteristics
- Dimensions: 42.53 km (derived); 42.59±2.0 km (IRAS:4); 46.003±0.761 km 49.26±1.96 km
- Mass: (1.80±0.90)×10^{17} kg (Note: Calculated from its standard gravitational parameter GM = 0.012±0.006 km^{3}/s^{2}.)
- Mean density: 3.65 g/cm^{3} (Note: Assuming a diameter of 46 km.)
- Synodic rotation period: 17.75 h
- Geometric albedo: 0.049±0.004; 0.05±0.01; 0.054±0.003; 0.0562 (derived); 0.0626±0.006 (IRAS:4)
- Spectral type: Tholen = P · P · D B–V = 0.658; U–B = 0.240
- Absolute magnitude (H): 10.48 · 10.48 (IRAS:4) · 10.55±0.24 · 10.60

2067 Aksnes, provisional designation 1936 DD, is a rare-type Hildian asteroid from the outermost region of the asteroid belt, approximately 44 kilometers in diameter. The asteroid was discovered on 23 February 1936, by Finnish astronomer Yrjö Väisälä at Turku Observatory in Southwest Finland. It was named after astronomer Kaare Aksnes.

== Orbit and classification ==
Aksnes is a member of the Hilda family, the outermost orbital group of asteroids in the main-belt, that are thought to have originated from the Kuiper belt. It orbits the Sun at a distance of 3.2–4.7 AU once every 7 years and 11 months (2,882 days). Its orbit has an eccentricity of 0.18 and an inclination of 3° with respect to the ecliptic.

The asteroid's observation arc begins on its discovery night at Turku, the first used observation. As all Hildian asteroids orbit in a 3:2 orbital resonance with the gas giant Jupiter, meaning that for every 2 orbits Jupiter completes around the Sun, they will complete 3 orbits, this asteroid's orbit does not cross the path of any of the planets and therefore it will not be pulled out of orbit by Jupiter's gravitational field. As a result of this, it is likely that the asteroid will remain in a stable orbit for thousands of years.

== Physical characteristics ==
The dark and reddish asteroid is characterized as a rare P-type and D-type asteroid in the Tholen classification and by the NEOWISE mission, respectively. Of either type only a few dozens bodies are currently known to exist in the Tholen and SMASS taxonomy.

=== Rotation period ===
During a photometric survey of Hildian asteroids in the 1990s, a rotational lightcurve was obtained of Aksnes by Swedish, German and Italian observatories . The lightcurve gave a rotation period of 17.75 hours with a brightness variation of 0.24 in magnitude (U=2).

=== Diameter and albedo ===
According to the surveys carried out by the Infrared Astronomical Satellite IRAS, the Japanese Akari satellite, and NASA's Wide-field Infrared Survey Explorer with its subsequent NEOWISE mission, Aksnes measures between 42.5 and 49.3 kilometers in diameter and its surface has a low albedo between 0.049 and 0.063. The Collaborative Asteroid Lightcurve Link derives an albedo of 0.056 and a diameter of 42.5 kilometers with an absolute magnitude of 10.6.

== Naming ==
This minor planet was named in honor of Norwegian astronomer Kaare Aksnes (born 1938), a celestial mechanician who worked at the Smithsonian Astrophysical Observatory in the 1970s.

Aksnes is known for his studies of artificial and natural satellites, in particular for his research on the Galilean satellites, the four largest moons of Jupiter, namely Io, Europa, Ganymede, and Callisto. The official naming citation was published by the Minor Planet Center on 1 September 1978 (M.P.C. 4482).
