= Garba Gashuwa =

Nigerian poet

Alhaji Garba Gashuwa
- Born: 1957 (age 68–69); Gasamu
- Occupation: Poet
- Writing career
- Genres: Politics, Religious and Social issues

Alhaji Garba Shu’aibu Gashuwa (born 1957) is a contemporary Nigerian Hausa poet.

== Early life ==
Alhaji Garba Shu’aibu Gashua, who is popularly known as "Garba Gashuwa", is a contemporary Nigerian Hausa poet, businessman, politician and a retired civil servant, born in Gasamu, in present-day Jakusko Local Government Area of Yobe State, North-Eastern Nigeria in 1957, to his father Sālisu and mother Salāmatu. Gashuwa’s father was a native of Badawa (Bade) and had four children, namely Sa’idu, Isa, Garba (the third), and Musa. Today, Garba Gashuwa resides in Kano with his family and has many children; among them is Musa Garba Gashuwa, a talented and popular composer.

== Education ==
In conformity with the general practice among Muslims communities in Hausaland, Gashuwa’s education started at the age of two when he attended a traditional Qur'anic school in Gasamu. On graduating he moved to Gashuwa, where he studied hadith, fiqh and other subjects related to Islamic knowledge. Gashuwa did not enroll in any formal Western school, but learnt from friends how to read and write in the Roman script. Gashuwa is also a polyglot.

== Career ==
=== Business ===
After completing his studies, the young Gashuwa, started a business in Bade town selling Islamic books such as Qawa’idi, Yasin Arashada, Iza-waqa, Ahalari and Dala’ilul Khairati. Apart from being a book vendor, he was also at one time a shoe vendor and a mai dinkin hula (a Hausa traditional cap-stitcher). He lived in Lagos for many years in pursuit of these entrepreneurial ventures.

=== Civil service ===
Gashuwa’s civil service career began when he eventually relocated and settled in Kano at the request of the late Malam Aminu Kano. His first appointment by the Kano State Government was at CTV-67's Cultural Section, during the administration of Alhaji Aliyu Sabo Bakin Zuwo. He worked there until 1989, when the State's military administrator Colonel Idris Garba, requested his transfer to the Kano State History and Culture Bureau, where he served as an adviser. He worked at the Bureau until he rose to the position of a member of its Board of Directors, a position he held from 1989 to 1995. He retired from service in 1995 and devoted his life to composing Hausa poems in Ajami script.

== Poetry ==
Gashuwa was inspired by Abdu Nguru, a poet of his acquaintance, and later started on Islamic subjects such as Isra’i & Mi’iraj, and the miracles and death (wafaat) of Muhammad. His works are normally penned in the Hausa Ajami script.

He started writing political poems during the 1978 campaign tour of National President of the People's Redemption Party, Malam Aminu Kano, held in Gashua and its environs. As a result, Aminu Kano invited Garba Gashuwa to reside in Kano, for him to continue making his contribution to political developments of the time. Whenever Gashuwa chanted his political poems, his audiences would chant the chorus, clapping their hands. Besides religion and politics, Gashuwa wrote on other subjects and, so far, has more than 1,000 Hausa Ajami poems to his name.

=== Themes, language and style of Gashuwa’s poems ===
Initially, Hausa poets used (and still use) the sixteen Arabic metres adopted from Arabic prosody in their composition. Today, some poets choose styles and themes that are modern, although the influence of Arabic poetry is still visible. Gashuwa bases most of his poetry on the rhythms of legendary Hausa singer and musician, Dr. Mamman Shata of Katsina, with themes including religion, politics, social issues, education, and traditional culture.

In the use of language and poetic devices, "the language of his poems is simple and apt to be understood by the average Hausa". He also make use of Arabic and English loanwords, dialect, proverbs and innuendo to express his points. Above all, Gashuwa always opens and closes his poem with a doxology, no matter the motif. Sometimes his poems are to be accompanied by hand clapping. For Gashuwa "an effective political poem should be chanted in a pleasant voice, accompanied by hand clapping, and should contain proverbs"; he holds that this will surely attract an audience’s attention. Below is an example of proverb in his poem named Ɗan Hakin da ka Raina, "The Little Grass That You Despise". This poem is in ƙwar biyar, pentastich form, with “bɑ̄” as the external rhyme.

"Verse No. 7" (Hausa Text)

Ko shī mɑ̄ rɑ̄ƙumin dawɑ̄ yai wani zancē,
Cikin maganɑ̄tai ta bɑ̄ya mu munka karancē,
Yanɑ̄ Allah wadai da naka in yɑ̄ lɑ̄lɑ̄cē,
Ganin na gidɑ̄ nɑ̄ ta turƙusō yɑ̄ gīgīcē,
Allah wadaran abin da bɑ̄ hairī nɑ̄ bɑ̄.

Translation:

The bush camel (giraffe) made a certain statement,
in a past speech, which we read,
in which he said, "God curse your brother for demeaning himself",
When in perplexity, he saw the domestic kneeling down and being loaded,
May God curse a bad thing such as this.

This stanza echoes a proverb in Hausa which states:

Allah wadan naka ya lalace, in ji raƙumin dawa, day a ga ana labtawa na gida kaya.

"God curse your brother for demeaning himself", as the bush camel (giraffe) said, when it saw the domestic camel heavily loaded.

Garba Gashuwa has published Fasahar Garba Gashuwa, "The Poems of Garba Gashuwa" (a transliteration from Ajami to Boko script), an Anthology, which includes a collection of 30 out of his many poems, edited by Professor Abdulƙadir Ɗangambo of Bayero University, Kano (2008), and published in Zaria, Kaduna State, Nigeria.

=== Reception of his work ===
There is a bachelors dissertation (in Hausa language) on his contributions to Hausa literature, written in 1990 by Amina Tijjani of Bayero University. There is a whole chapter in Abdullahi Birniwa’s doctoral thesis, 1987, Usman Danfodio University, Sokoto, Nigeria, which analyses Ɗan Hakin da ka Raina, cited above. Another doctoral thesis by Jibril Shu'aibu Adamu of University of Warsaw, Poland, uses his poems as part of materials being studied.

== Selected poems ==
Ɗan Hakin da ka Raina... (The little grass that you despise...)

Aminu Nuruz Zamᾱni (Eulogy to Malam Aminu Kano)

A Jihar Kano mun sam Nasara (We won the victory in Kano State)

Mu’aujizar Manzon Allah (S. A. W) (The Miracles of the Prophet (P.B.U.H)

Aikin Hajji (Pilgrimage)

Ta’aziyyar Tsohon Gwamnan Kano Alhaji Aliyu Sabo Bakin Zuwa (The Poem for Mourning the Late Kano State Governor, Alhaji Aliyu Sabo Bakin Zuwo)

Ta’aziyar Tsohon Shugaban Ƙasar Najeriya Janaral Sani Abacha (The Poem for Mourning the Former Head of State General Sani Abacha.

Rabu da Faɗin Mutum (Let them say)

Cin Hanci Haramun ne (Bribery is an Unlawful Act)

Tsafta Cikon Addini ce (Cleanness is the Completeness of Religion)

‘Yan Tagwayen Jam’iyyu (The Twin Political Parties S. D. P. & N. R. C.)

Ilimi Garkuwa Ɗan’adam (Knowledge, the Shield of Human Being)

Ilimi Makamin Bawa (Knowledge, the Weapon of the Slave)

Ilimi Cikar Ɗan’adam (Knowledge, the Completeness of the Human Being)

Munafurcin Karen Ruwa Jam’iyyar A. P. P. (The Hypocrisy of the Ottur, A. P. P. Party)

Mashaya Giya (Drunkards)

Halayen Wasu Mata da Maza (The Behaviour of Some Women and Men)

Matan Aure Hattara Dai! ( Housewives be careful)
