= Per Norvik =

Norwegian journalist and editor

- Born: 10 February 1938 (age 87); Vadsø, Norway
- Occupation: Journalist

Per Kristian Norvik (born February 10, 1938) is a Norwegian journalist and editor.

== Biography ==
Per Kristian Norvik was born in Vadsø, Norway on February 10, 1938. He is the older brother of businessman Harald Norvik and a cousin of politician Erling Norvik.

Norvik began his medical studies in 1957, but dropped out in 1959 to become a journalist at Morgenbladet. From 1965 to 1970 he worked at Aftenposten. Since 1970 he worked as editor at Arbeidsgiveren (1970-1972), and as a political journalist at NRK (1972-1978). Norvik joined Verdens Gang in 1978, where he worked as associate editor (1978-1986), and political editor (1986-1993).

In November 1993 Norvik left Verdens Gang together with its editor Einar Hanseid, becoming political editor at Aftenposten (1993-2000). He functioned as the acting editor-in-chief at Aftenposten in the absence of Hanseid. As an editor Norvik became well known for his taciturnity and avoidance of the public spotlight, which inspired Norwegian public figures to entrust him with confidential information. He was for many years one of the most prominent political journalists in Norway.

Norvik announced his intention to leave Aftenposten in April 2000, in what was considered a surprise move among politicians and fellow journalists. He has subsequently worked as a political commentator at TV 2, TV 2 Nettavisen and Kanal 24.

Media offices
Preceded by None	Political Editor at Aftenposten; 2000	Succeeded by Håvard Narum
