= Ole Herman Fisknes =

Norwegian jurist and civil servant

Ole Herman Fisknes (born 23 May 1938) is a Norwegian jurist and civil servant.

He took the cand.jur. degree in 1964, and was employed at the University of Oslo until 1965. He mainly worked in the Norwegian Ministry of Justice and the Police from 1965 to 1977, with certain leaves to work as consultant for the Parliamentary Ombudsman and as deputy judge. He has also been a part-time teacher at the University of Oslo and the MF Norwegian School of Theology.

He was appointed as an assistant secretary in the Ministry of Church Affairs and Education in 1977. From 1984 to 2008 he served as deputy under-secretary of state. As the bureaucrat with the largest amount of control over the State Church of Norway, he has been called a Norwegian "arch-bishop" and the true leader of the Church. In 2009 he was elected to the main committee of Kirkelig fellesråd i Oslo.
