= Reidar Nielsen =

Norwegian politician and newspaper editor (1938–2018)

Reidar Nielsen (16 June 1938 – 3 July 2018) was a Norwegian newspaper editor and politician for the Labour Party.

He started his journalistic career in Vestfinnmark Arbeiderblad at the age of 19. He became subeditor before starting in Arbeiderbladet in 1968. He returned to Vestfinnmark Arbeiderblad (Finnmark Dagblad) as editor-in-chief, then Nordlys in 1973. He was replaced in 1982, returned to Finnmark Dagblad, and after a stint in Dagningen from 1989 he finished his career in NRK. He was a member of the Broadcasting Council from 1983 to 1988.

He served as a deputy representative to the Parliament of Norway from Finnmark during the term 1965–1969. In total he met during 86 days of parliamentary session. He also chaired Finnmark Labour Party.
