= Bjørn Hansen (journalist) =

Norwegian journalist (born 1938)

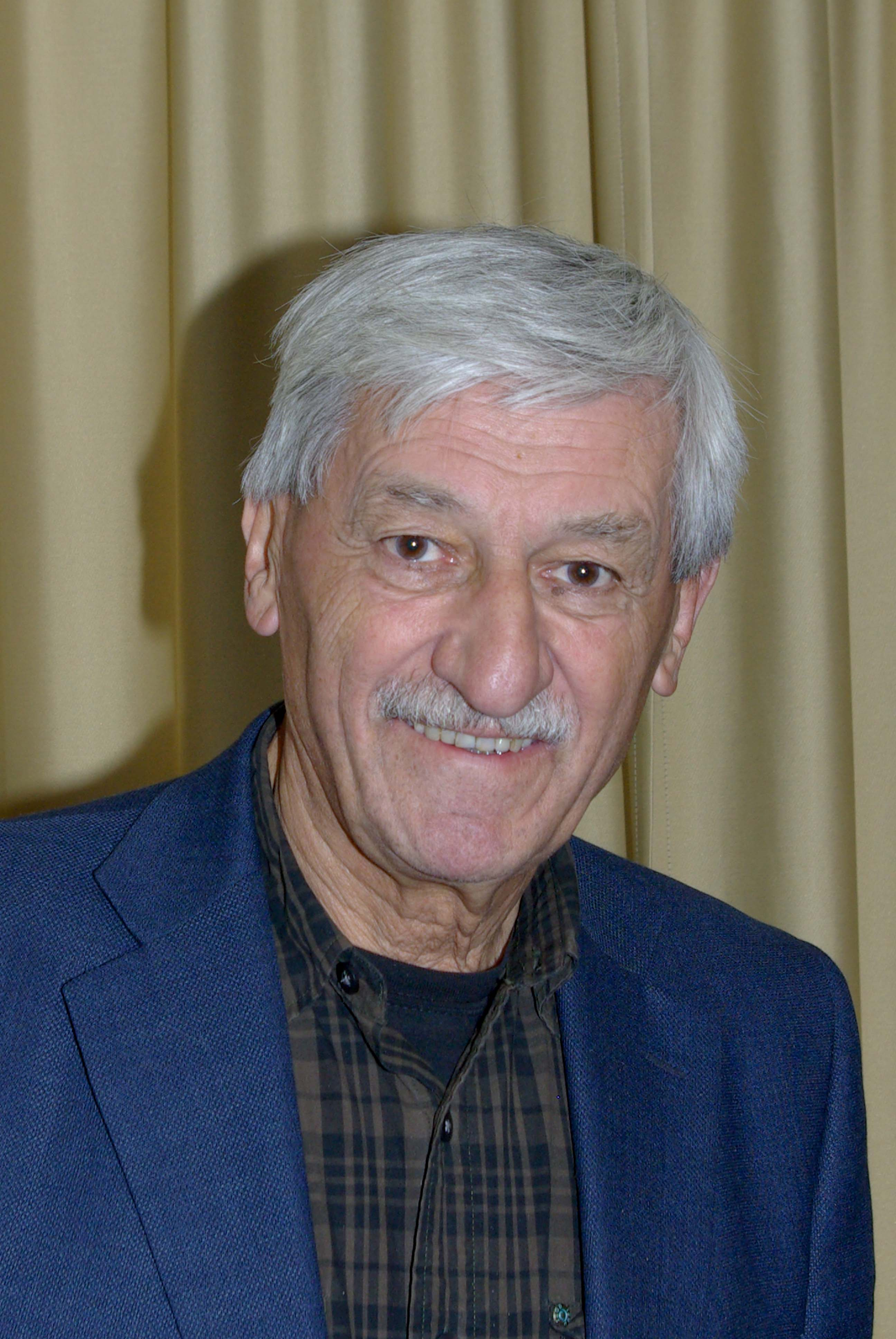
- Born: 12 October 1938 (age 86); Tromsø, Norway
- Occupation: Journalist

Bjørn Hansen (born 12 October 1938) is a Norwegian journalist. In Norway, he is well known as an experienced news presenter and correspondent, having worked for the Norwegian state-owned radio and television public broadcasting company, Norwegian Broadcasting Corporation.

== Career ==
Hansen was born in Tromsø and started as a newspaper journalist in Nordlys (1957–1960 and 1961–1963), Halden Arbeiderblad (1960–1961) and Arbeiderbladet. For the latter he was a foreign correspondent in London. He was employed in the Norwegian Broadcasting Corporation in 1978.

He was a correspondent for NRK in Washington, D.C., from 1991 to 1995. He presided over election debates and has also appeared several times on CNN as well as other international news channels. From 2002 to 2007, he was the host for the Thursday night foreign news program Urix.

In 2009 Bjørn Hansen was awarded the lifetime achievement award at Gullruten (the Norwegian television awards).

Bjørn Hansen currently lives in his seaside house in Nesodden with his wife.

Media offices
Preceded by Håvard Narum	Correspondent of NRK in Washington, DC; 1991–1995	Succeeded by Ingvild Bryn
