= Kjell Henriksen =

Norwegian physicist

Kjell Henriksen (1 February 1938 – 3 April 1996) was a Norwegian scientist, professor at the University of Tromsø and researcher with a special interest in the polar lights. For his effort in researching the polar lights a new observatory has been named after him, the Kjell Henriksen Observatory on Svalbard.
