= Egil Ly =

Norwegian sailor

Egil Ly (born 31 October 1938) is a Norwegian retired sailor.

He represented the Royal Norwegian Yacht Club and competed in the 1964 Summer Olympics. In the mixed three person keelboat class as a crew member under Morits Skaugen.

He was born in Oslo, and resides in Rykkinn.
