= Asbjørn Bjørnset =

Norwegian politician

Asbjørn Bjørnset (11 December 1938 – 6 July 2023) was a Norwegian politician for the Socialist Left Party.

He was born in Flora and took the cand.polit. degree at the University of Bergen. He was hired at the University of Bergen in 1970. He advanced to secretary and director of the Faculty of Psychology from 1987 to 1992 and Faculty of History and Philosophy from 1993 to 2004. He was a senior adviser at the University of Bergen until 2008, and thereafter at the Norwegian Association of Higher Education Institutions.

Bjørnset was a member of the municipal council for Bergen Municipality from 1972 to 1974 and member of Hordaland county council from 1976 to 1981. He served as a deputy representative to the Parliament of Norway from Hordaland during the terms 1973–1977, 1981–1985, 1985–1989 and 1989–1993. In total he met during 220 days of parliamentary session.

He resided at Ask.
