= Terje Bergstad =

Norwegian painter and printmaker

Terje Bergstad (14 October 1938 – 7 February 2014) was a Norwegian painter and printmaker.

== Biography ==
He was born in Oslo, with strong roots in Telemark, but resided in Bærum. He attended the Norwegian National Academy of Craft and Art Industry under Karl Høgberg, Bjarne Brunsvik and Chrix Dahl from 1962 to 1965. He followed with training at the Norwegian National Academy of Fine Arts under Reidar Aulie and Halvdan Ljøsne from 1965 to 1968. He also attended the Académie de la Grande Chaumière and Académie Goetz in Paris from 1968 to 1969.

He was awarded the Finnes legat in 1963 and 1965; A. C. Houens legat in 1964; Røwdes legat in 1965; and Ths. Fearnleys stipend in 1965. His debut came at the Kunstnerforbundet in Oslo during 1967, followed by the Autumn Exhibition (Høstutstillingen) 1974–1979 and several others in Norway and abroad. His works were bought by the National Gallery of Norway, the National Museum of Art, Architecture and Design, Oslo Municipality and the Arts Council of Norway.

He died in February 2014 in Bærum.

== Other sources ==
- Gunnar Sørensen (2011) Terje Bergstad- Under en mørkere himmel (Oslo: Orfeus Publishing) ISBN 9788293140009
