= Gunnar Garbo =

Norwegian politician (1924–2016)

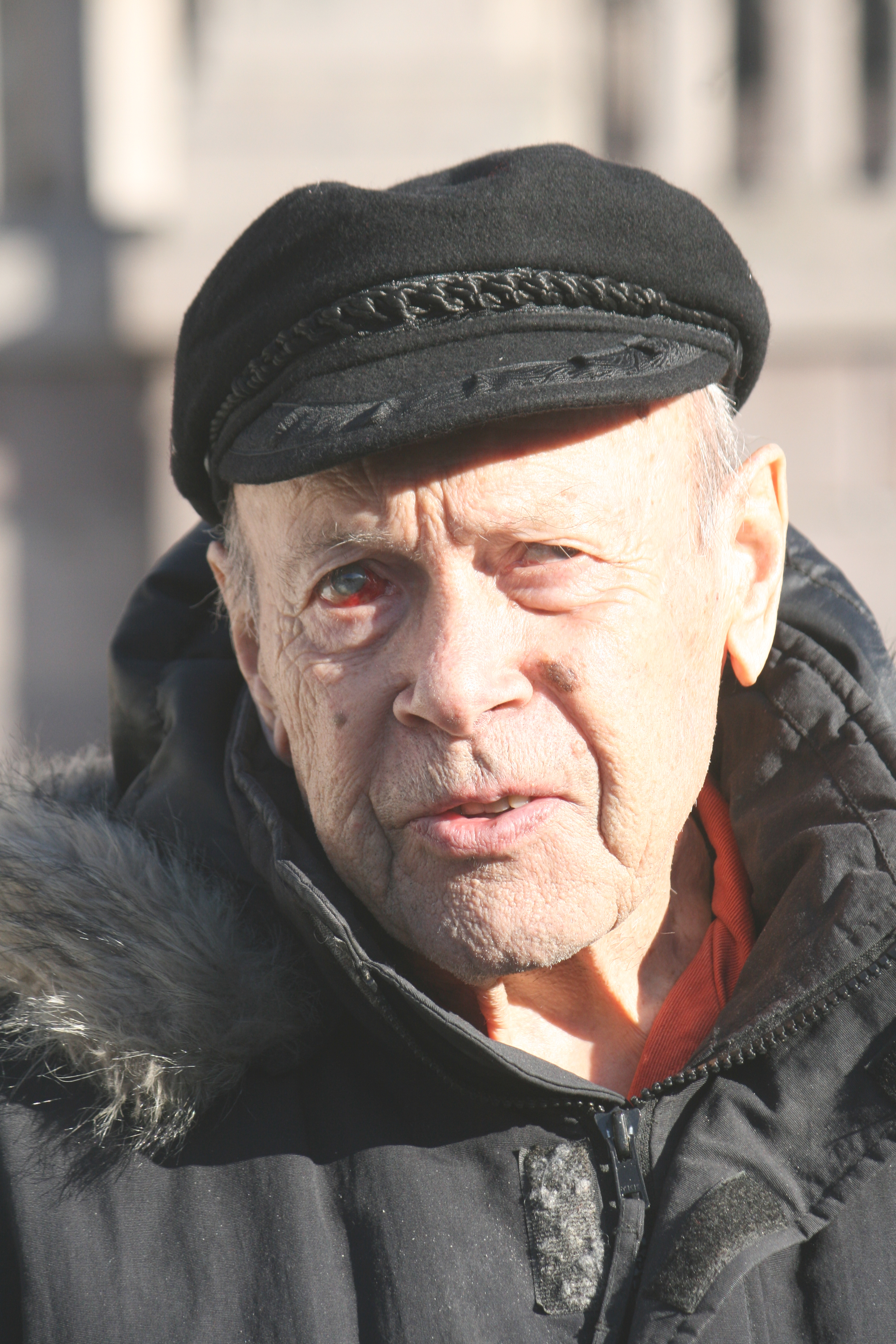
- Garbo in 2011
- Born: 19 April 1924; Bergen, Norway
- Died: 29 June 2016 (aged 92)
- Spouses: Gerd Olsen (m. 1944–1950) Maren Elisabeth Lund (m. 1951; died 1958) Kirsten Agathe Lien (m. 1959–1973) Birgit Brock-Utne (m. 1973)

Gunnar Garbo (19 April 1924 – 29 June 2016) was a Norwegian journalist, politician, and ambassador. He represented the Liberal Party of Norway at the Norwegian Parliament during four electoral periods, from 1958 to 1973, and was leader for the party from 1964 to 1970. He was ambassador in Dar es Salaam from 1987 to 1992.

== Early and personal life ==
Garbo was born in Bergen, as the son of Ingvald Garbo and Sara Haugland. His father Ingvald Garbo was shot by the Germans in 1941, for listening to radio and distributing the news. Gunnar Garbo himself had to flee to Sweden in 1943, where he joined the police troops. He worked as a journalist for Bergens Tidende from 1945, and was later editor of the newspaper Nidaros in Trondheim, from 1954 to 1957.

== Political career ==
Garbo was a member of Bergen city council from 1948 to 1954, and Trondheim city council from 1956 to 1957.

He was deputy representative to the Norwegian Parliament from Bergen during the term 1954–1957, and was elected member of the Parliament during the terms 1958–1961, 1961–1965, 1965–1969 and 1969–1973. As a representative he was a member of the Procol Committee, the Standing Committee on Finance and Customs, and the Standing Committee on Foreign Affairs and Constitutional Affairs. He was chairman for the Liberal Party of Norway from 1964 to 1970. He was a substitute assembly member of the Parliamentary Assembly of the Council of Europe from 1963 to 1965 and 1966 to 1970.

Garbo was a researcher at the International Peace Research Institute, Oslo from 1974, and worked for the Ministry of Foreign Affairs from 1980 to 1987. He was Ambassador to Tanzania from 1987 to 1992.

Garbo has written several books and numerous articles on political issues, in particular on international politics, including themes such as disarmament and on the United Nations. He has also written memoirs from his political life.

Party political offices
Preceded by Bent Røiseland	Leader of the Liberal Party; 1964–1970	Succeeded by Helge Seip
