= Sverre Olaf Lie =

Norwegian pediatrician (1938–2023)

- Born: 27 February 1938
- Died: 9 March 2023 (aged 85); Oslo
- Education: University of Oslo
- Known for: Research and work with children's cancer
- Spouse: Kari Kveim Lie
- Awards: See main article
- Scientific career
- Fields: Paediatrics
- Workplaces: University of Oslo

Sverre Olaf Lie (27 February 1938 – 8 March 2023) was a Norwegian pediatrician. He was head of the Pediatric Research Institute at University of Oslo from 1975 till 1989 and chairman and professor at the department of pediatrics at the National Hospital of Norway, Rikshospitalet from 1989 till 2006.

== Early life ==
Lie was born in Oslo. When he was four years old, his father Bjarne Lie lost his job as a lawyer due to problems with the Nazi authorities. The family moved to Sulitjelma, where Bjarne had got the post as office manager at the Sulitjelma Mines. The early years there were marked by the Nazi occupation. His father was central in the local resistance movement (the leader of the local chapter of XU, a clandestine intelligence organisation), and there was a general scarcity. The family was gifted a barrel of herring from family in the south and they would have herring for dinner every day. In later life, he would never again eat herring! But Sulitjelma remained in his heart for other and more important reasons as well. The experience of social cohesion and thriving cultural life in spite of gross social inequities, and of an astonishing nature, would remain important reference points for him throughout his life. The years in Sulitjelma also left physical traces. As a result of working in the mines as a teenager, he developed a hearing loss which worsened in later life.

As there was no highschool in Sulitjelma, in 1954 he moved to Kongsvinger to live with friends of the family at Skansgården. He completed highschool in 1957, and played piano in the orchestra for the "russerevyen".

== Education ==
Partly motivated by the sudden death of his father in 1957, he started medical school that same year. He was fascinated by lectures by Kåre Jøssum, the first academic in Norway to do experimental research in genetics. Intrigued by the recent discovery of the double helix, and by how it raised new questions of life and death, he asked to be Jøssum's assistant at Kaptein Wilhelmsens og Frues bakteriologiske institutt. In 1961, he received a scholarship to go to Rochester to study molecular genetics on microbes, and continued his research upon his return to Oslo. He finished medical school (MD) in 1965 at University of Oslo and one year later in 1966 received his PhD in molecular genetics with the title On the genetics of Neisseria menigitidis.

== Professional and private life ==
After completing medical school, he did his internship (turnus) in Moss Hospital and his district service in Senja. He then felt the privilege of having two opportunities - continuing his research career in genetics or working in the clinic. He chose the latter, and was never in doubt that the field should be paediatrics. While working in the paediatric department in Rikshospitalet, he immediately fell in love with a six-year younger medical student named Kari Helene Elise Kveim upon meeting her in the hospital canteen in April 1967. They married on 7 December that same year, and spent their honeymoon in a Palestine refugee camp in Jordan, after Israelis had seized the Westbank during the June war in 1967 and left many Palestinians homeless. Sverre established a mother and child health station there in 1967 and supervised this activity till 1975. International health would be important for him during his whole life. He was a member of an advisory board to Norad (Norwegian Agency for Development Cooperation) from 1973 to 1978 and worked to promote international engagement among Norwegian physicians through the Norwegian medical association.

From 1971 to 1972 he took his family, consisting of Kari and their two children (they would later get two more children) to Baltimore, where he was a visiting scientist at Johns Hopkins Hospital 1971–72 (with professor Victor A. McKusick), a man he would remain connected to throughout his career. He was recognized as a specialist in paediatrics in 1973 and specialist in medical genetics in 1975.

In the early 1970s, inspired by recent developments in the US, he started aggressive treatment on children with acute leukemia. The introduction of aggressive treatment was controversial, as the side effects for the children were enormous. But the new drugs were potentially going to offer real hope of cure for cancer and leukaemia which only a few years before had been almost invariably fatal. He developed the service in his own hospital and helped others to join him in providing a network of care across the whole of Oslo and Norway. In 1980, his Swedish colleague Lasse Åstrøm took the initiative to a meeting for paediatricians interested in child oncology. That was the starting point for the Nordic Society for Pediatric Hematology and Oncology (NOPHO), formally established in 1984, where Lie would be a driving force.

Much of the early success had been in acute lymphoblastic leukaemia but the less common acute myeloid leukaemia proved more stubborn. They shared clinical experience and started doing clinical research, comparing clinical outcomes across the Nordic countries. Lie and colleagues developed a new approach and the NOPHO group followed the patients with three consecutive studies. The first patient that survived is still alive today and one of her children is named Sverre.

Increasingly, he was also active in SIOP, the international association for child oncology. From 1996 to 1999, after having served four years as a treasurer in the board, he was president of the association.

The host of the SIOP meeting in Hannover in 1992, raised money to invite young doctors from low and middle-income countries, which resulted in Paediatric Oncology in the Developing Countries (PODC). After Lie became president, he recruited young and energetic colleagues, mainly from India and Africa, asking them what they would like to prioritise. Representatives from India said they wanted capacity building and training for their young doctors. Lie convinced the Director General of WHO, Gro Harlem Brundtland (whom he knew from medical school) to give a grant of $100,000 to get PODC started.

In India this led to several workshops to develop training materials to "train the teachers". This has been hugely successful and India and the surrounding countries now have networks of care providing excellent treatment for children with cancer.

In South Africa he initiated a collaboration with Peter Hesseling, to develop a cost effective treatment for Burkitt's lymphoma, which at the time had a terrible prognosis. They developed a slimmed down protocol which reduced costs from $45,000 (which was the cost in high-income countries) to $50 for each patient, and raised survival rates to almost 40%, including supportive care.

== Post-retirement professional life ==
After retiring, Lie changed career and started working in global health. He worked as a senior advisor to the prime minister of Norway in the field of maternal, newborn and child health from 2006 to 2010, and after that worked in the global health section of the Norwegian health directorate from 2008 to 2018. From 2018 to 2019 he was a consultant at NAKMI, the competence center of immigrants health.

Lie published more than 200 articles in journals and books and was co-author of several books.

== Awards and honours ==
- Elected member of the Norwegian Academy of Science and Letters, 1993 and is elected member of the Children Cancer Study Group, UK and US.
- Awarded the 100-year anniversary prize of Norske Kvinners Sanitetsforening (Norwegian Woman's Public Health Association) which is the biggest NGO in Norway, 1996.
- Elected "Professorem Hospitem" of the Universitas Carolina Pragensis (Charles University in Prague), 1996.
- Elected Honorary Member of the Royal College of Paediatrics and Child Health in Great Britain. The Royal College is a continuation of the British Paediatrics Association (BPA). Since 1928, when BPA was formed, only 4 paediatricians from the Nordic Countries have been given this honour. He is the only member from Norway. 1999.
- Ordered Knight, First Class of the Royal Norwegian Order of St. Olav by the Norwegian King, 2001.
- Elected as an Honorary Member of the Society of Scholars of the Johns Hopkins University, 2004, as first Norwegian
- Honorary member of Norwegian Paediatric Association, 2004
- Honorary member of Indian Academy of Pediatrics, 2004
- Honorary member of the South African Children's Cancer Study Group from 2010
