= Birgit Brock-Utne =

Norwegian academic and writer

- Born: 4 May 1938 (age 87); Oslo, Norway
- Occupations: academic and writer
- Known for: advocy for mother-tongue education in African schools
- Notable work: Language and Power: The Implications of Language for Peace and Development
- Spouses: Bård Gaarder (m. 1960–1973) Gunnar Garbo (m. 1973)

Birgit Brock-Utne (born 4 May 1938) is a Norwegian academic and non-fiction writer. She is known for her academic work and activism for civil society spanning education, feminism, and peace studies, with a strong international dimension.

== Personal life ==
Brock-Utne was born in Oslo on 4 May 1938, to Gerhard Brock-Utne and translator Gertrud Hessenberg. From 1960 to 1973 she was married to judge Bård Gaarder, and in 1973 she was married to politician and diplomat Gunnar Garbo (1924–2016).

== Career ==
Brock-Utne holds a Ph.D. both in education and political science from the University of Oslo. From 1987 to 1992, she was visiting professor at the University of Dar-es-Salaam, and from 1995 until her retirement professor at the Department of Education at the University of Oslo. Further, she has taught and done research across institutions in Norway, Tanzania, New Zealand, Japan, and the U.S.

Brock-Utne has strongly advocated for mother-tongue education in African schools, arguing that using colonial languages like English or French hinders students' learning, as they often have inadequate knowledge of English. In 1996, she authored a paper titled Reliability and Validity in Qualitative Research within Education in Africa, published by UNESCO. It explores methodological challenges in African educational research and advocates for Afrocentric approaches. In 2009, Mkuki na Nyota in Tanzania published her book Language and Power: The Implications of Language for Peace and Development.

Additionally, she has worked as independent consultant in education and development, peace education, curriculum development, multilingualism, gender, education and development, including for Save the Children, Norway, and NORAD/CASAS.

Among her non-fiction books are Kunnskap uten makt (Knowledge without Power) from 1980, Educating for Peace. A Feminist Perspective from 1985, and En mors tåre. Vi som mister våre barn på veiene (A Mother’s Tear: We who lose our Children on the Roads) from 1986.
