= Oddvar Stenstrøm =

Norwegian journalist

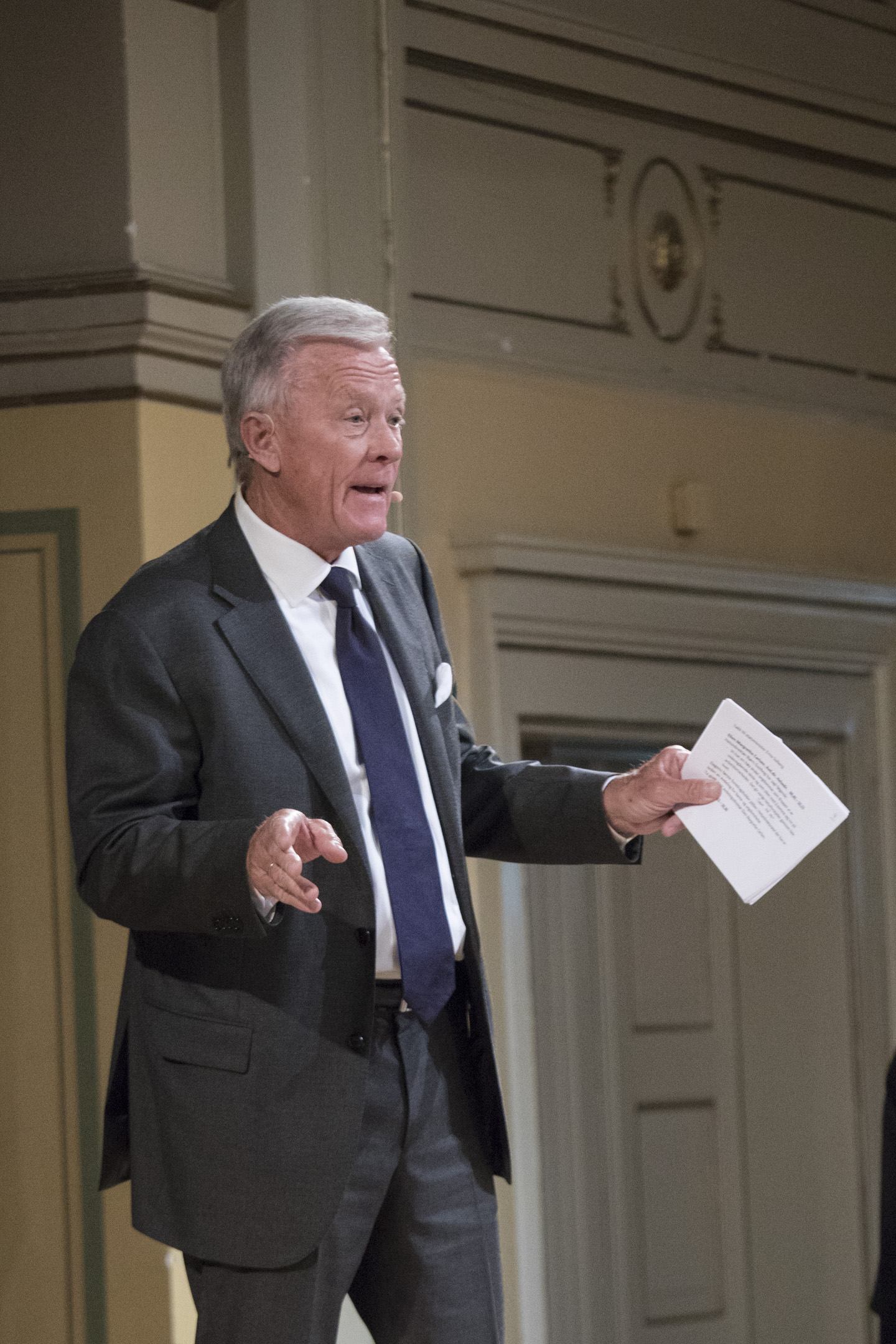
- Stenstrøm in 2018.
- Born: 5 March 1946 (age 79); Oslo, Norway
- Occupation: Journalist

Oddvar Stenstrøm (born 5 March 1946) is a Norwegian journalist and former host of the TV2 debate program Holmgang.

Stenstrøm has worked in a number of different journals and news channels, including the local newspaper Akers Avis/Groruddalens Budstikke, the national tabloids Dagbladet and Verdens Gang (the latter as head of foreign news) and as news editor for Aftenposten.

In television media, Stenstrøm has had several jobs for NRK between 1975 and 1987, and for TV2 from 1992. For NRK he has been the Washington D.C. correspondent, and head of the editorial board for the news broadcasts. For TV2 Stenstrøm was the editorial project leader from 1991 to 1992, before becoming Washington correspondent in 1997. He took over the Holmgang program after Nils Gunnar Lie in 1998, and held that until the program was shut down in 2008.

As host for Holmgang, Stenstrøm was frequently under fire for what was perceived as frequently oversimplified topics, a genre viewed to favor the Progress Party. Among the criticisms were allegations from electoral researcher Frank Aarebrot that the program promoted racism, an allegation Stenstrøm strongly denounced. In an interview before Holmgang was over, Stenstrøm pointed out that one of the programs had been on the needed work foreigners do, titled "Uten innvandrere stopper Norge" ("Without foreigners, Norway stops").

Oddvar Stenstrøm is a republican.

Media offices
| Preceded by Audun Tjomsland | Correspondent of NRK in Washington D. C. 1983–1987 | Succeeded by Håvard Narum |
