= Reidar Grønhaug =

Norwegian social anthropologist

Reidar Grønhaug (2 December 1938 – 2 September 2005) was a Norwegian social anthropologist.

He was born in Stavanger. He took his mag.art. degree in 1967, and started working as a lector at the University of Bergen. He was promoted to associate professor in 1972, took his dr.philos. degree on the thesis Micro-Macro Relations: Social Organization in Antalya, Southern Turkey in 1975 and became a professor in 1976.
