= Oddvar Nes =

Norwegian linguist

Oddvar Nes (27 December 1938 – 18 September 2016) was a Norwegian linguist.

He became a research assistant at the University of Bergen in 1964, and was promoted to associate professor in 1973 and professor in 1987. His speciality is onomastics. He was a visiting scholar at University of Vienna from 1988 to 1989, and a member of Norwegian Academy of Science and Letters and the Royal Gustavus Adolphus Academy.

He resided in Florvåg.
