= Kaare Aksnes =

Norwegian astrophysicist (1938–2026)

Kaare Aksnes (25 March 1938 – 22 February 2026) was a Norwegian astrophysicist.

== Personal life ==
He was born in Kvam Municipality in Hordaland county. He was a brother of the chemist Gunnar Aksnes. His parents were farmers. In 1959 he married teacher Liv Kristin Marøy.

== Career ==
He finished his secondary education in 1956, and graduated with the cand.real. degree in 1963, having studied in both Bergen and Oslo. From 1964 to 1965 he was a research assistant at Harestua. He then worked in the United States for several years, and took the Ph.D. at Yale University in 1969. His doctor's thesis is today a standard work within estimating the course of planets, moons, meteors, comets and artificial sounds. His work is among other things used by NASA's Voyager sounds to Jupiter, and he received the NASA Group Achievement Award for his work.

After several years at the Center for Astrophysics | Harvard & Smithsonian in Cambridge, Massachusetts he returned from the United States to Norway in 1978, where he was employed at the Norwegian Defence Research Establishment from 1978 to 1988. He was also an assisting professor at the University of Tromsø from 1980. In 1988 he was appointed as a professor at the University of Oslo. From 1993 he was also responsible for the official Norwegian almanac.

He is a member of the Norwegian Academy of Science and Letters since 1991. Since 1990 he presides over the International Astronomical Union Working Group for Planetary System Nomenclature, which maintains the astronomical naming conventions and planetary nomenclature for planetary bodies. Already in 1978, the asteroid 2067 Aksnes was named after Aksnes. In 2006 he received the HM The King's Medal of Merit in gold. He died in February 2026 in Bærum.
