= Oddbjørn Engvold =

Norwegian astronomer

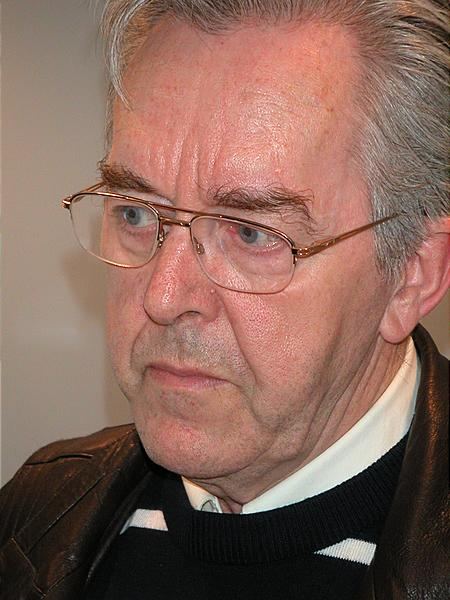
Oddbjørn Engvold in 2003

Oddbjørn Engvold (born 7 April 1938) is a Norwegian astronomer.

He was born in Askim. His specialty is solar physics, and he was appointed as a professor at the University of Oslo in 1989. He was secretary general of the International Astronomical Union from 2003 to 2006 and a member of the board of Norwegian Academy of Science and Letters from 1993 to 1998.
