= Oddvar Torsheim =

Norwegian painter, illustrator and musician (born 1938)

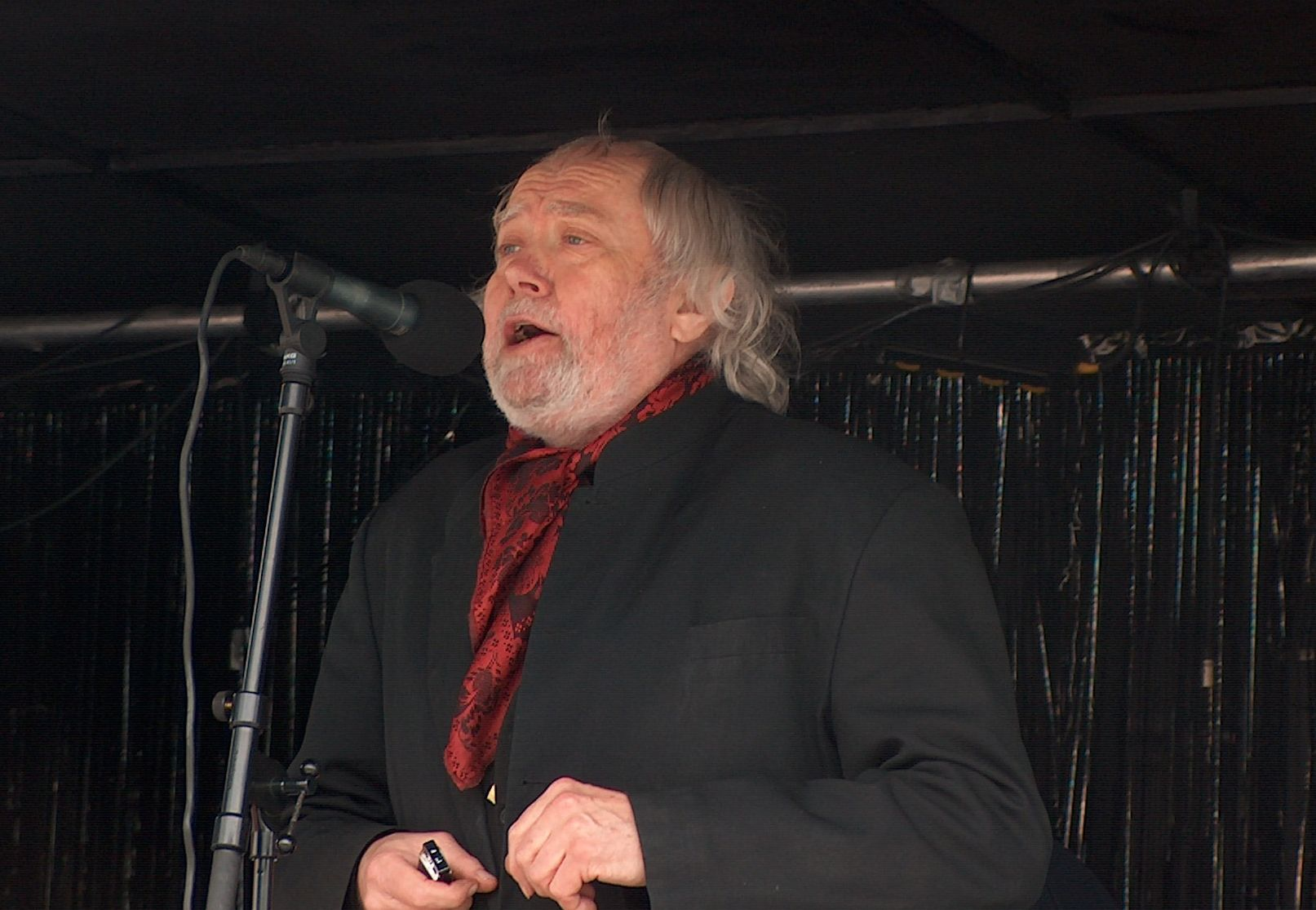
- Born: 2 November 1938 (age 87); Bergen, Norway
- Occupations: Painter; Illustrator; Musician

Oddvar Torsheim (born 2 November 1938) is a Norwegian painter, illustrator and musician.

Torsheim was born in Bergen to teachers Herman Johan Torsheim and Jenny Pauline Høvik. Among his publications are Syner i syttiåra from 1980, and Svarte kvitingar i 80-åra from 1988. His book illustrations include Cindy Haug's children's book Her der – helt nær from 1983 and Ingvar Moe's essay collection Frå oppvaskkummen, and he recorded the music albums Nynorskens skog in 1992 and Turretur Blues in 2000. He is represented with artworks in the Norwegian Museum of Contemporary Art in Oslo.
