= Selje Municipality =

Former municipality in Sogn og Fjordane, Norway

Selje Municipality Selje kommune
- Former municipality
- Selløe herred (historic name)
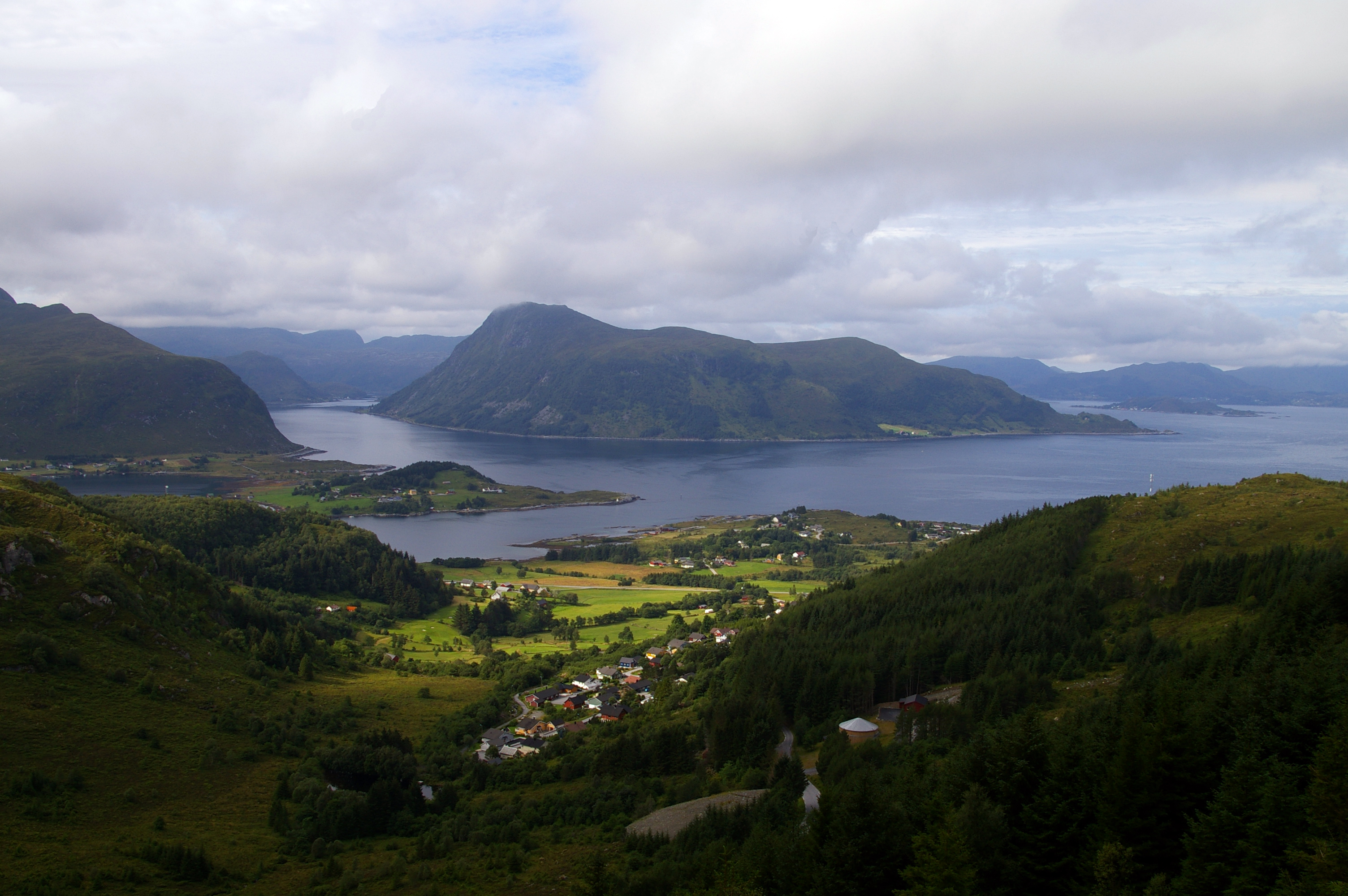
- View of the island of Barmen in Selje

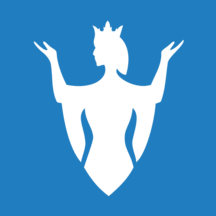
- Flag Coat of arms

- Sogn og Fjordane within Norway

- Selje within Sogn og Fjordane
- Coordinates: 62°08′14″N 05°13′23″E
- Country: Norway
- County: Sogn og Fjordane
- District: Nordfjord
- Established: 1 Jan 1838
  - Created as: Formannskapsdistrikt
- Disestablished: 1 Jan 2020
  - Succeeded by: Stad Municipality
- Administrative centre: Selje

Government
  - Mayor (2015-2019): Stein Robert Osdal (KrF)

Area (upon dissolution)
  - Total: 226.12 km^{2} (87.31 sq mi)
  - Land: 219.89 km^{2} (84.90 sq mi)
  - Water: 6.23 km^{2} (2.41 sq mi) 2.8%
  - Rank: #317 in Norway
- Highest elevation: 774.6 m (2,541 ft)

Population (2019)
  - Total: 2,747
  - Rank: #279 in Norway
  - Density: 12.1/km^{2} (31/sq mi)
  - Change (10 years): ▼ −4.4%
- Demonym: Seljeværing

Official language
  - Norwegian form: Nynorsk
- Time zone: UTC+01:00 (CET)
  - Summer (DST): UTC+02:00 (CEST)
- ISO 3166 code: NO-1441

Selje is a former municipality in the old Sogn og Fjordane county, Norway. The 226-square-kilometre (87 sq mi) municipality existed from 1838 until its dissolution in 2020. The area is now part of Stad Municipality in the traditional district of Nordfjord in Vestland county. The administrative centre was the village of Selje. Other villages in the municipality included Barmen, Ervik, Flatraket, Hoddevik, Hoddevika, Håvik, and Leikanger.

Prior to its dissolution in 2020, the 226.12-square-kilometre (87.31 sq mi) municipality was the 317th largest by area out of the 422 municipalities in Norway. Selje Municipality was the 279th most populous municipality in Norway with a population of about 2,747. The municipality's population density was 12.1 inhabitants per square kilometre (31/sq mi) and its population had decreased by 4.4% over the previous 10-year period.

Selje Municipality was located at the northwesternmost part of Sogn og Fjordane county. Most of the municipality was located on and around the Stadlandet peninsula as well as some small surrounding islands such as Selja and Barmøya.

Selja was one of the first three Episcopal sees in Norway (Oslo, Nidaros, and Selja). After the diocese was moved to Bergen, monks took over the old Selje Church, which was later destroyed by pirates in 1536. The municipality of Selje was also home to the Selja Abbey, a former Benedictine monastery located on the island of Selja. Ruins of the abbey and church can still be seen on the island.

== General information ==
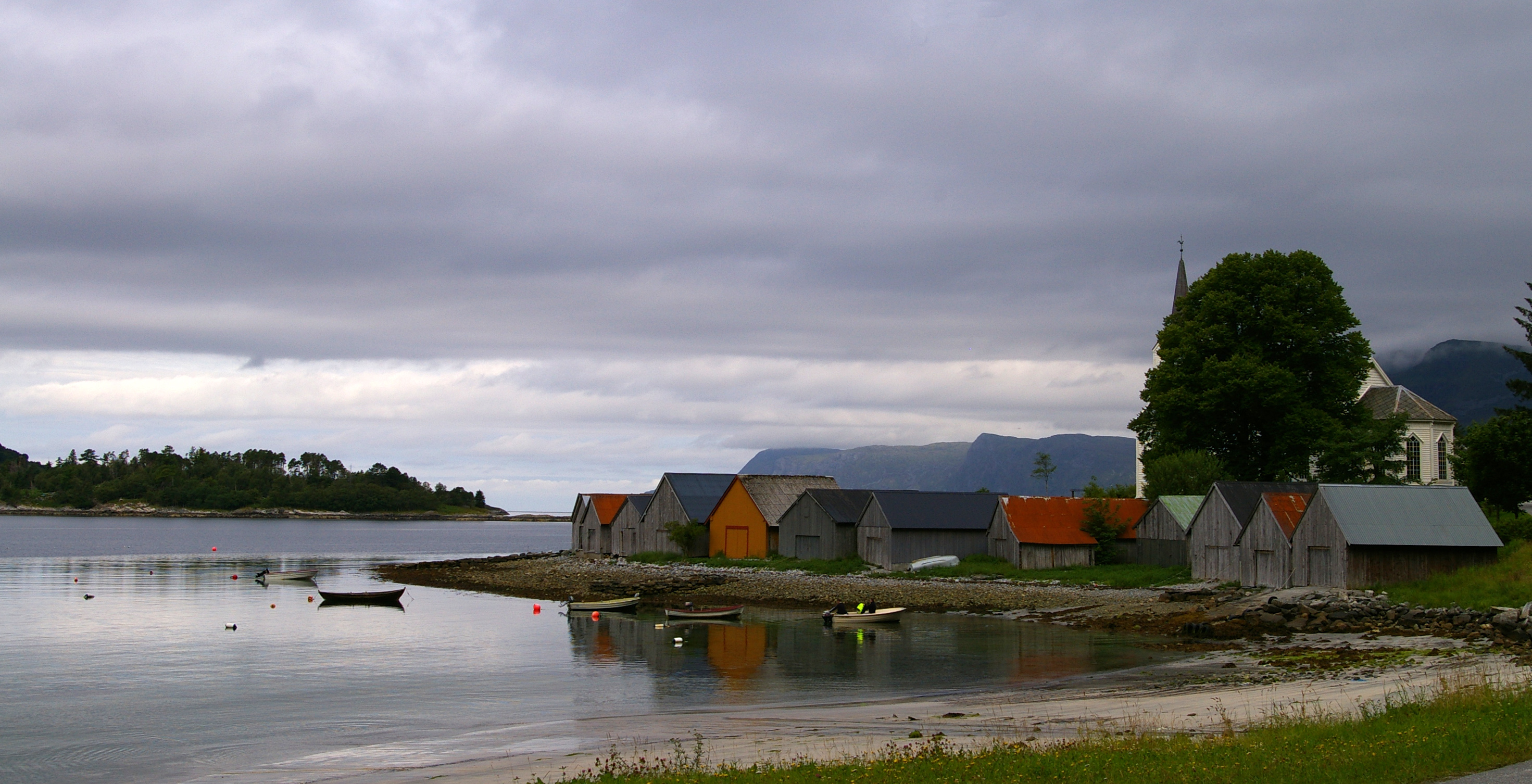
Some boat-houses at Selje

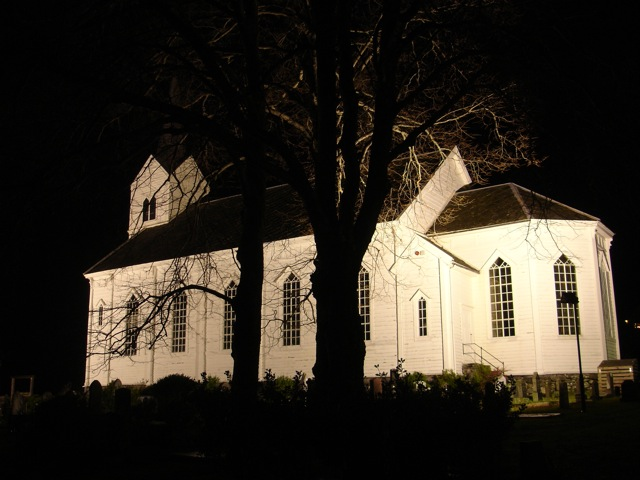
Selje Church

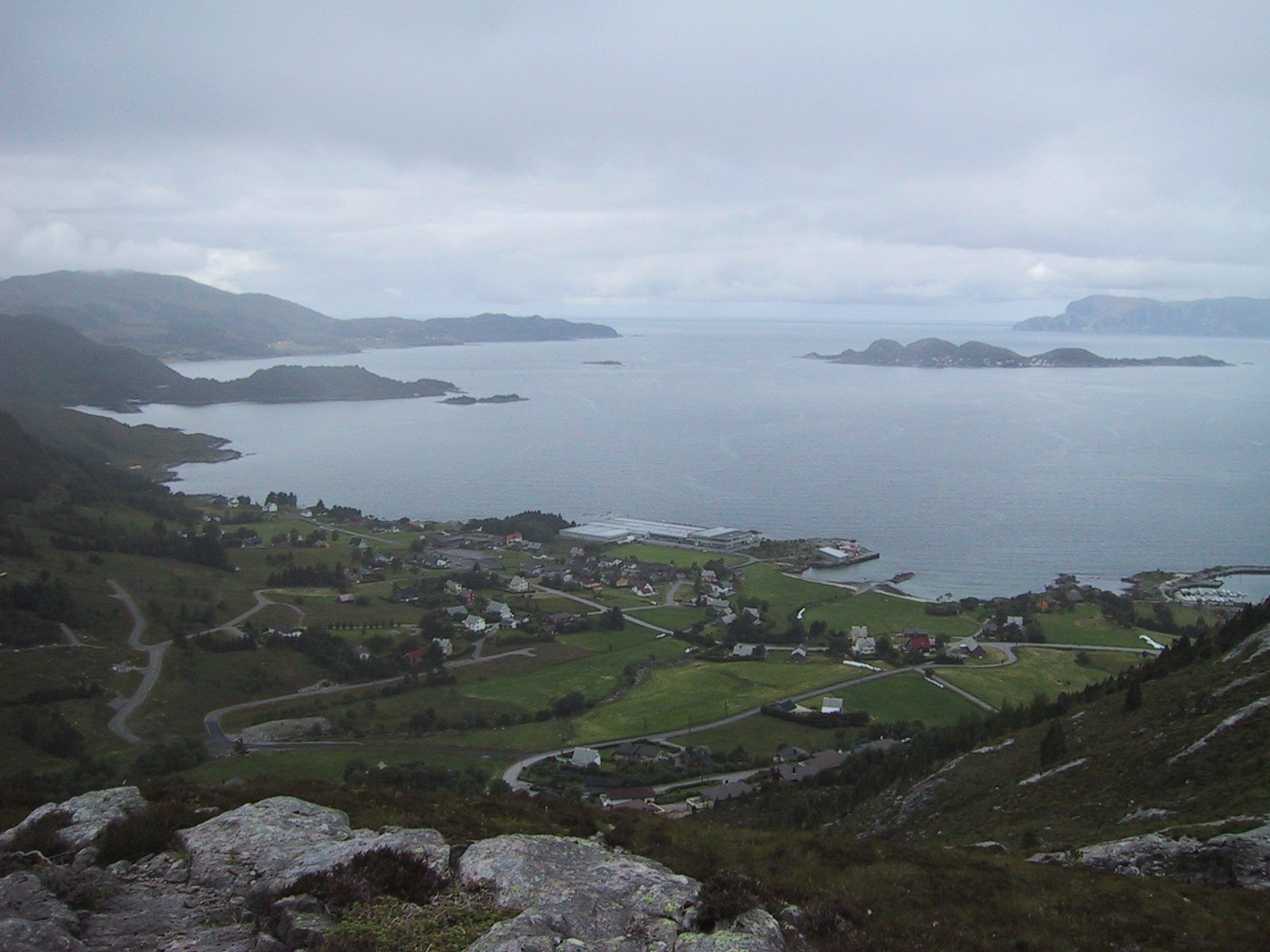
Flatraket

Selje was established as a municipality on 1 January 1838 (see formannskapsdistrikt law). The original municipality was identical to the historic Selje prestegjeld with the sub-parishes (sokn) of Hove and Vågsøy. The municipality originally included all of the Stadlandet peninsula, the island of Vågsøy and the mainland area north of the mouth of the Nordfjorden.

On 1 January 1910, Selje Municipality was divided into three municipalities:

- the southern part of the island of Vågsøy and the southwestern part of the mainland (population: 1,517) became the new Sør-Vågsøy Municipality
- the northern part of the island of Vågsøy (population: 1,111) became the new Nord-Vågsøy Municipality
- the rest of the municipality (population: 3,367) remained as Selje Municipality (the sub-parish of Hove was renamed Selje at the same time).

During the 1960s, there were many municipal mergers across Norway due to the work of the Schei Committee. On 1 January 1964, the island of Silda, the Hagevik-Osmundsvåg area, and the farms of Sørpollen and Straumen of Selje Municipality (population: 344) were merged with Nord-Vågsøy Municipality and Sør-Vågsøy Municipality to form the new Vågsøy Municipality.

On 1 January 2020, Selje Municipality was dissolved and the following areas were merged to form the new Stad Municipality:

- all of Selje Municipality
- all of Eid Municipality
- the Bryggja-Totland area of Vågsøy Municipality

=== Name ===
The municipality (originally the parish) is named after the small island of Selja since the first Selje Church was built there. The meaning of the name is uncertain. One possibility is that it is derived from the word sel which means "pasture shed", particularly used in the sæter mountain farms. A less likely possibility is that it comes from the word salr which means "room" or "hall", referring to the local cave where Saint Sunniva and her followers dwelled after reaching the island in the 10th century. Prior to 1889, the name was written Selø or Selløe.

=== Coat of arms ===
Coat of arms

The coat of arms was granted on 5 April 1991 and it was in use until 1 January 2020 when the municipality was dissolved. The official blazon is "Azure, a half woman with raised hands argent" (Norwegian: På blå grunn ein halv sølv kvinnefigur med lyfta hender). This means the arms have a blue field (background) and the charge is the upper half of a woman with raised arms and crown. The charge has a tincture of argent which means it is commonly colored white, but if it is made out of metal, then silver is used. The woman is a depiction of Saint Sunniva, the royal Irish missionary who died as a martyr on the island of Selja while trying to convert he locals to Christianity. Later, the Selje Abbey was built on the spot where she died. She was later named the patron saint of the Norwegian Diocese of Bjørgvin and all of Western Norway. The arms were designed by Turid Haye. The municipal flag has the same design as the coat of arms.

=== Churches ===
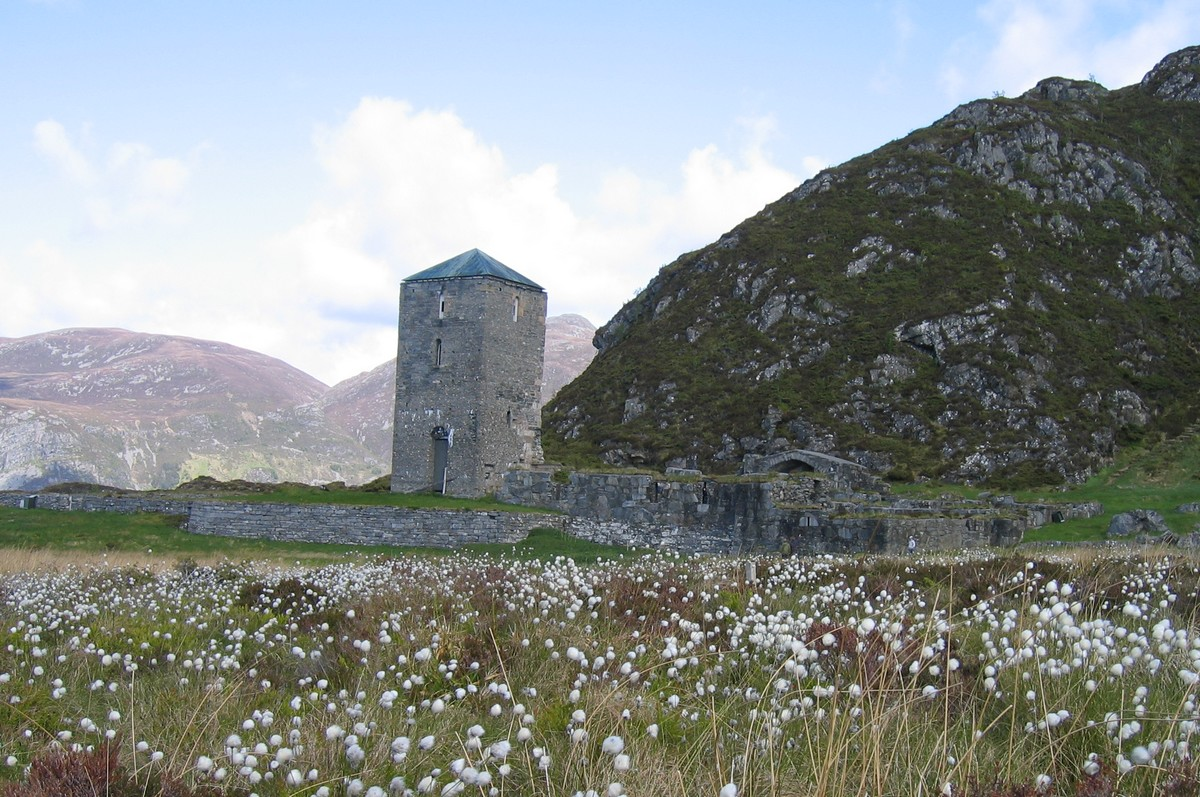
Ruins of the Selje Abbey on Selja

The Church of Norway has three parishes (sokn) within Selje Municipality. It is part of the Nordfjord prosti (deanery) in the Diocese of Bjørgvin.

Churches in Selje Municipality
| Parish (sokn) | Church name | Location of the church | Year built |
|---|---|---|---|
| Ervik | Ervik Church | Ervik | 1970 |
| Leikanger | Leikanger Church | Leikanger | 1866 |
| Selje | Selje Church | Selje | 1866 |
Note:the ruins of the Selja Abbey (built in 1100) are located on the island of Selja.

== Government ==
While it existed, Selje Municipality was responsible for primary education (through 10th grade), outpatient health services, senior citizen services, welfare and other social services, zoning, economic development, and municipal roads and utilities. The municipality was governed by a municipal council of directly elected representatives. The mayor was indirectly elected by a vote of the municipal council. The municipality was under the jurisdiction of the Sogn og Fjordane District Court and the Gulating Court of Appeal.

=== Municipal council ===
The municipal council (Herredsstyre) of Selje Municipality was made up of 17 representatives that were elected to four year terms. The tables below show the historical composition of the council by political party.

Selje kommunestyre 2015–2019
| Party name (in Nynorsk) | Number of representatives |
|---|---|
| Labour Party (Arbeidarpartiet) | 1 |
| Progress Party (Framstegspartiet) | 4 |
| Conservative Party (Høgre) | 2 |
| Christian Democratic Party (Kristeleg Folkeparti) | 2 |
| Centre Party (Senterpartiet) | 3 |
| Cross-party list (Tverrpolitisk liste) | 5 |
| Total number of members: | 17 |

Selje kommunestyre 2011–2015
| Party name (in Nynorsk) | Number of representatives |
|---|---|
| Labour Party (Arbeidarpartiet) | 1 |
| Progress Party (Framstegspartiet) | 4 |
| Conservative Party (Høgre) | 3 |
| Christian Democratic Party (Kristeleg Folkeparti) | 3 |
| Centre Party (Senterpartiet) | 1 |
| Cross-party list (Tverrpolitisk liste) | 5 |
| Total number of members: | 17 |

Selje kommunestyre 2007–2011
| Party name (in Nynorsk) | Number of representatives |
|---|---|
| Labour Party (Arbeidarpartiet) | 4 |
| Progress Party (Framstegspartiet) | 4 |
| Conservative Party (Høgre) | 3 |
| Christian Democratic Party (Kristeleg Folkeparti) | 3 |
| Centre Party (Senterpartiet) | 2 |
| People's common list (Folkeleg fellesliste) | 1 |
| Total number of members: | 17 |

Selje kommunestyre 2003–2007
| Party name (in Nynorsk) | Number of representatives |
|---|---|
| Labour Party (Arbeidarpartiet) | 4 |
| Progress Party (Framstegspartiet) | 3 |
| Conservative Party (Høgre) | 2 |
| Christian Democratic Party (Kristeleg Folkeparti) | 4 |
| Centre Party (Senterpartiet) | 2 |
| People's common list (Folkeleg fellesliste) | 2 |
| Total number of members: | 17 |

Selje kommunestyre 1999–2003
| Party name (in Nynorsk) | Number of representatives |
|---|---|
| Labour Party (Arbeidarpartiet) | 4 |
| Progress Party (Framstegspartiet) | 4 |
| Conservative Party (Høgre) | 6 |
| Christian Democratic Party (Kristeleg Folkeparti) | 5 |
| Centre Party (Senterpartiet) | 1 |
| Cross-party common list (Tverrpolitisk samlingsliste) | 3 |
| People's common list (Folkeleg fellesliste) | 2 |
| Total number of members: | 25 |

Selje kommunestyre 1995–1999
| Party name (in Nynorsk) | Number of representatives |
|---|---|
| Labour Party (Arbeidarpartiet) | 5 |
| Conservative Party (Høgre) | 8 |
| Christian Democratic Party (Kristeleg Folkeparti) | 3 |
| Centre Party (Senterpartiet) | 3 |
| Socialist Left Party (Sosialistisk Venstreparti) | 1 |
| Liberal Party (Venstre) | 1 |
| Cross-party common list (Tverrpolitisk samlingsliste) | 4 |
| Total number of members: | 25 |

Selje kommunestyre 1991–1995
| Party name (in Nynorsk) | Number of representatives |
|---|---|
| Labour Party (Arbeidarpartiet) | 6 |
| Conservative Party (Høgre) | 6 |
| Christian Democratic Party (Kristeleg Folkeparti) | 4 |
| Centre Party (Senterpartiet) | 5 |
| Liberal Party (Venstre) | 1 |
| Non-political common list (Upolitisk samlingsliste) | 3 |
| Total number of members: | 25 |

Selje kommunestyre 1987–1991
| Party name (in Nynorsk) | Number of representatives |
|---|---|
| Labour Party (Arbeidarpartiet) | 6 |
| Conservative Party (Høgre) | 7 |
| Christian Democratic Party (Kristeleg Folkeparti) | 5 |
| Centre Party (Senterpartiet) | 3 |
| Liberal Party (Venstre) | 4 |
| Total number of members: | 25 |

Selje kommunestyre 1983–1987
| Party name (in Nynorsk) | Number of representatives |
|---|---|
| Labour Party (Arbeidarpartiet) | 7 |
| Conservative Party (Høgre) | 7 |
| Christian Democratic Party (Kristeleg Folkeparti) | 6 |
| Centre Party (Senterpartiet) | 4 |
| Liberal Party (Venstre) | 1 |
| Total number of members: | 25 |

Selje kommunestyre 1979–1983
| Party name (in Nynorsk) | Number of representatives |
|---|---|
| Labour Party (Arbeidarpartiet) | 5 |
| Conservative Party (Høgre) | 6 |
| Christian Democratic Party (Kristeleg Folkeparti) | 6 |
| Centre Party (Senterpartiet) | 5 |
| Liberal Party (Venstre) | 3 |
| Total number of members: | 25 |

Selje kommunestyre 1975–1979
| Party name (in Nynorsk) | Number of representatives |
|---|---|
| Labour Party (Arbeidarpartiet) | 2 |
| Conservative Party (Høgre) | 8 |
| Christian Democratic Party (Kristeleg Folkeparti) | 6 |
| Liberal Party (Venstre) | 4 |
| Non-party Election List for the Moldestad area (Upolitisk Valliste for Moldestad Krins) | 1 |
| Election List for the Stokkevåg area (Valliste for Stokkevåg Krins) | 1 |
| Non-party Election List for outer, middle, and southern Selje (Upolitisk Valliste for Ytre, Midtre og Søre Selje) | 3 |
| Total number of members: | 25 |

Selje kommunestyre 1971–1975
| Party name (in Nynorsk) | Number of representatives |
|---|---|
| Labour Party (Arbeidarpartiet) | 2 |
| Conservative Party (Høgre) | 5 |
| Local List(s) (Lokale lister) | 18 |
| Total number of members: | 25 |

Selje kommunestyre 1967–1971
| Party name (in Nynorsk) | Number of representatives |
|---|---|
| Local List(s) (Lokale lister) | 25 |
| Total number of members: | 25 |

Selje kommunestyre 1963–1967
| Party name (in Nynorsk) | Number of representatives |
|---|---|
| Local List(s) (Lokale lister) | 25 |
| Total number of members: | 25 |

Selje heradsstyre 1959–1963
| Party name (in Nynorsk) | Number of representatives |
|---|---|
| Conservative Party (Høgre) | 3 |
| Local List(s) (Lokale lister) | 22 |
| Total number of members: | 25 |

Selje heradsstyre 1955–1959
| Party name (in Nynorsk) | Number of representatives |
|---|---|
| Labour Party (Arbeidarpartiet) | 3 |
| Conservative Party (Høgre) | 5 |
| Local List(s) (Lokale lister) | 17 |
| Total number of members: | 25 |

Selje heradsstyre 1951–1955
| Party name (in Nynorsk) | Number of representatives |
|---|---|
| Local List(s) (Lokale lister) | 24 |
| Total number of members: | 24 |

Selje heradsstyre 1947–1951
| Party name (in Nynorsk) | Number of representatives |
|---|---|
| Local List(s) (Lokale lister) | 24 |
| Total number of members: | 24 |

Selje heradsstyre 1945–1947
| Party name (in Nynorsk) | Number of representatives |
|---|---|
| Local List(s) (Lokale lister) | 24 |
| Total number of members: | 24 |

Selje heradsstyre 1937–1941*
| Party name (in Nynorsk) | Number of representatives |
|---|---|
| Local List(s) (Lokale lister) | 24 |
| Total number of members: | 24 |
Note: Due to the German occupation of Norway during World War II, no elections were held for new municipal councils until after the war ended in 1945.

=== Mayors ===
The mayor (Nynorsk: ordførar) of Eid Municipality was the political leader of the municipality and the chairperson of the municipal council. The following people have held this position:

- 1838–1843: Rev. Wilhelm Frimann Koren
- 1844–1849: Josef P. Moldestad
- 1850–1857: Rev. Wilhelm Frimann Koren
- 1858–1861: Josef P. Moldestad
- 1862–1869: Julius C. Hartmann
- 1870–1871: Peder I. Sandvik
- 1872–1873: Knut Halvorsen
- 1874–1875: Sivert J. Berge
- 1876–1890: Christian B.U. Wiese
- 1890–1891: Anders O. Listau
- 1892–1895: Lars Strømme
- 1896–1897: Anders O. Listau
- 1898–1916: R. Hjertenæs
- 1917–1922: Reiel Nybø
- 1923–1928: Johannes J. Bortne
- 1929–1941: Petter Vederhus
- 1945–1945: Hilmar Ervik
- 1946–1963: Johannes O. Sande
- 1964–1967: Ragnvald Berge
- 1968–1971: Julius Fure (H)
- 1972–1975: Nils Sætren (Sp)
- 1976–1981: Julius Fure (H)
- 1982–1983: Magne Aarøen (KrF)
- 1984–1989: Åge Starheim (FrP)
- 1990–1997: Sverre Hoddevik (H)
- 1998–2001: Magny Husetuft Myklebust (H)
- 2001–2011: Gunn Helgesen (KrF)
- 2011–2015: Ottar Nygård (LL)
- 2015–2019: Stein Robert Osdal (KrF)

== Geography ==
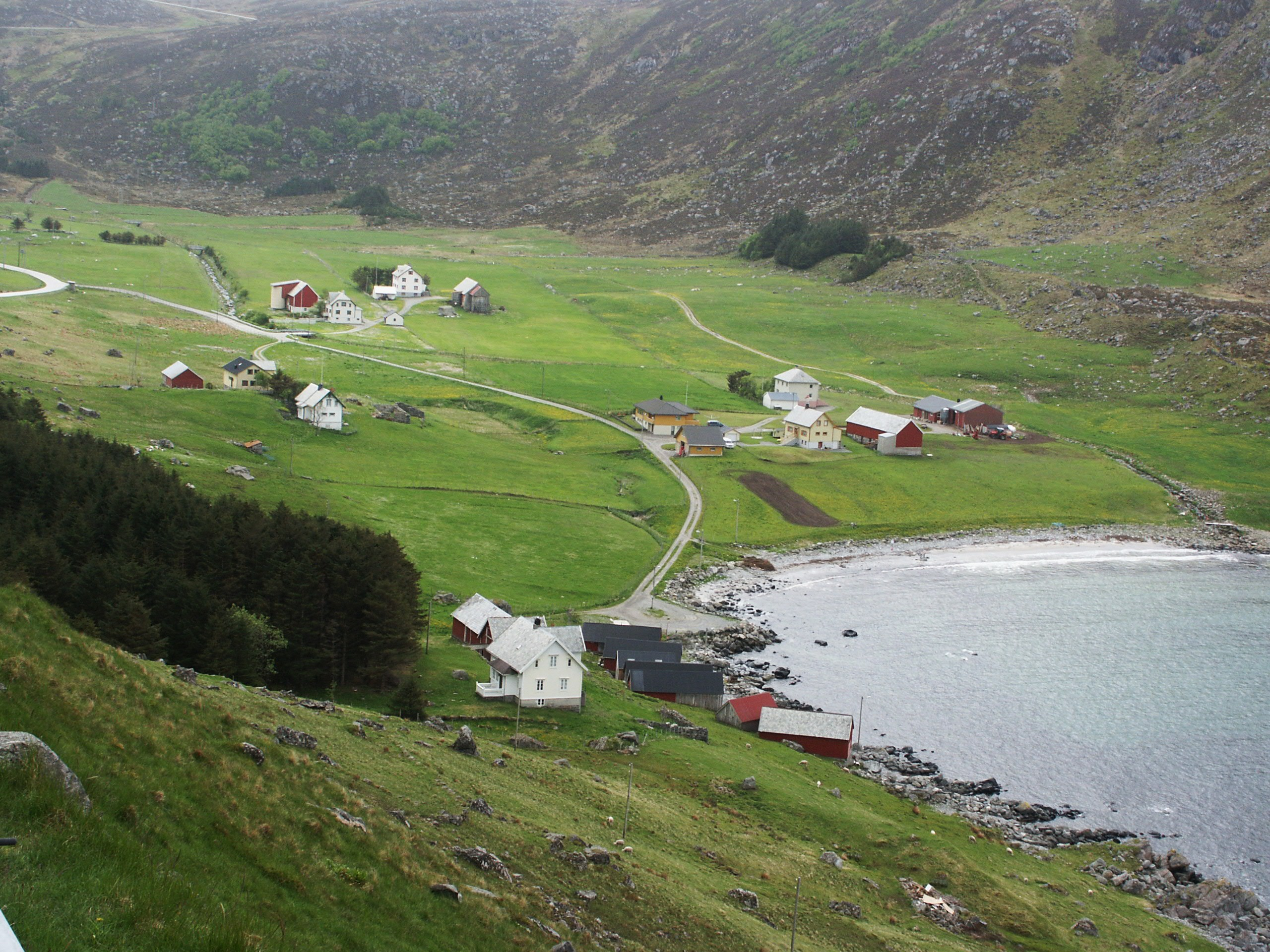
The village of Årvik on the Stad peninsula

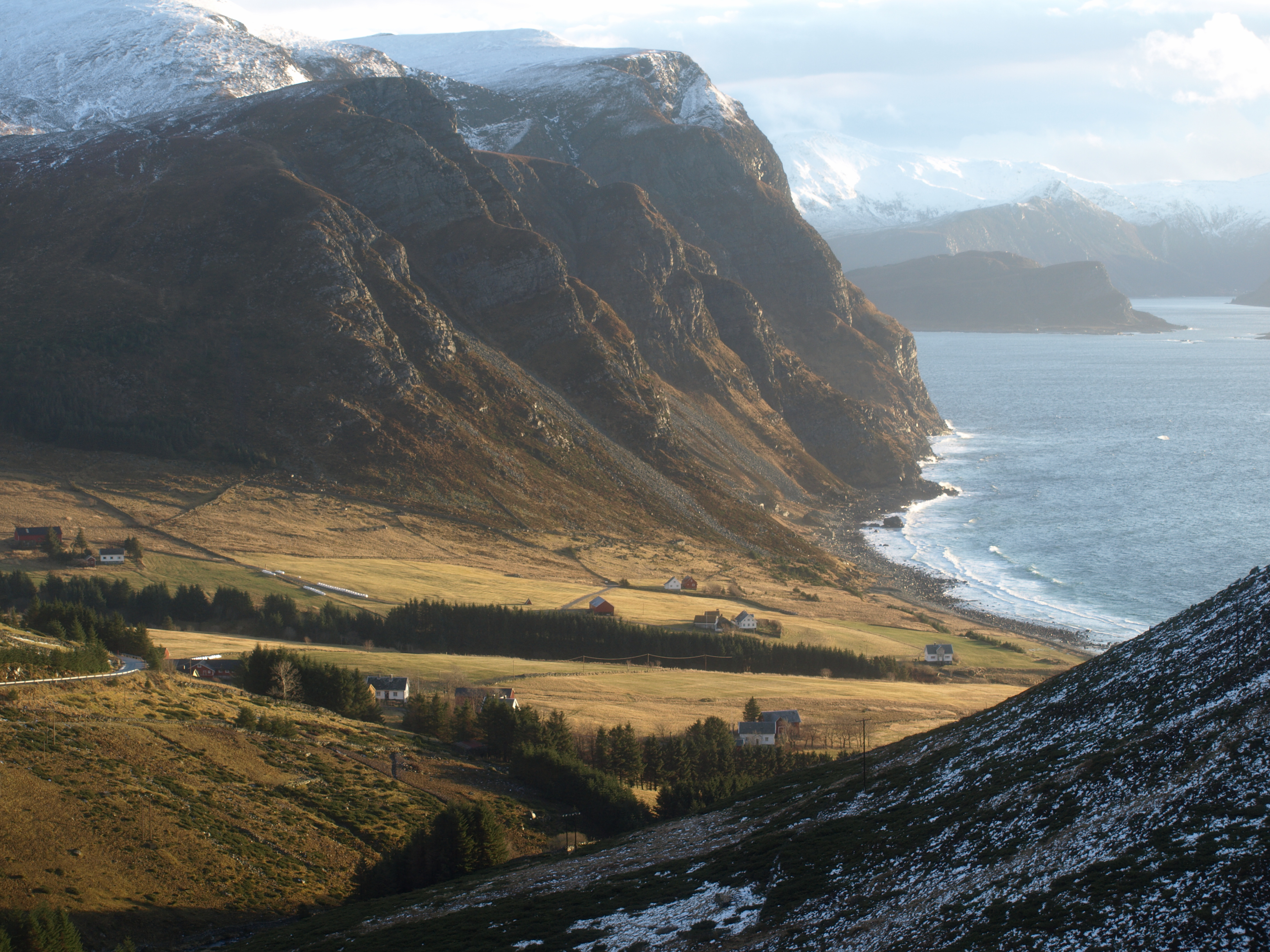
The village of Drage on the Stad peninsula

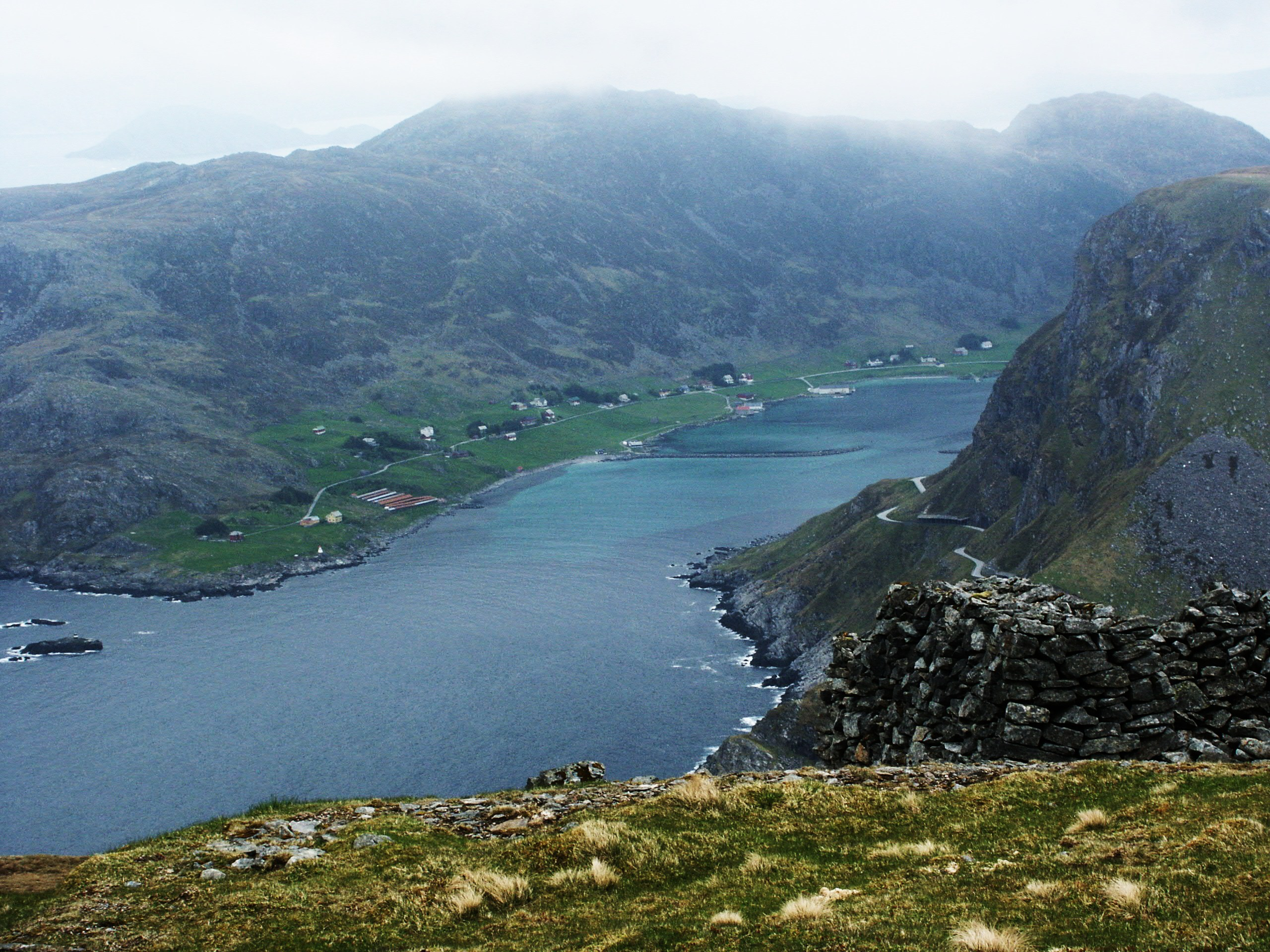
Honningsvåg lake on the Stad peninsula

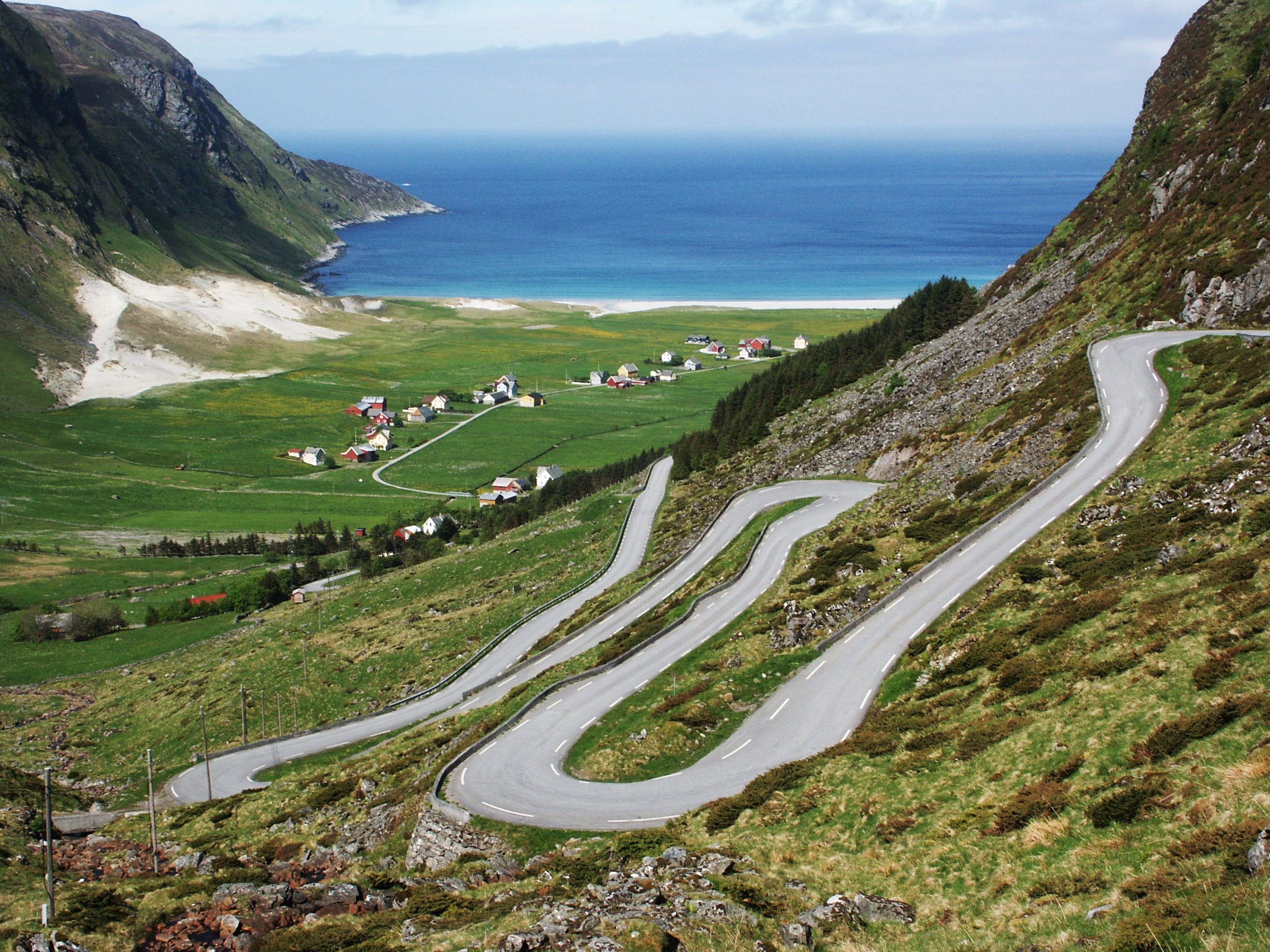
Hoddevik village on the Stad peninsula

Selje Municipality was located in the northwesternmost part of Sogn og Fjordane county, in the Nordfjord region. It included the Stad peninsula and the islands of Barmøya, Venøya, and Selja. Selje Municipality was surrounded by water on three sides: the Sildagapet bay on the west, the North Sea to the north, and the Vanylvsfjorden to the northeast. The highest point in the municipality was the 774.6-metre (2,541 ft) tall mountain Kvamfjellet.

Selje Municipality was bordered to the south and west by Vågsøy Municipality and to the east by Vanylven Municipality and Sande Municipality (both in Møre og Romsdal county).

== Economy ==
Historically, the main industries in Selje Municipality were fishing and farming. These industries were present in Selje throughout its existence, with the addition of new industries such as fish breeding, boat building, ready-made clothing manufacturing, and service industries. The Skorge Hydroelectric Power Station was located in the municipality.

== Attractions ==
=== Selja ===
On the island of Selja, a 15-minute boat trip from the village of Selje, lie the ruins of the Selja Abbey, its tower still intact. The abbey was built by Benedictine monks early in the 12th century in honour of St. Sunniva. The legend of St. Sunniva who was martyred here lives on. Norway has two male saints (St. Olav and St. Hallvard) and one female one, St. Sunniva, the guardian saint of Western Norway. According to legend, Sunniva, daughter of an Irish king, fled when her country was conquered by heathens and the new king wanted to marry her. She came ashore on the island of Selja. The St. Sunniva cave where Sunniva is said to have died is a large cavern containing remains of walls and traces of the first church dedicated to the Archangel Michael.

The island of Selja is also home to the following sites:

- The site of the first Selje Church which was later moved to the mainland. The ruins of St. Sunniva's Church on the site where Olav Trygvasson built one of the first churches in Norway.
- The ruins of St. Alban's Church, the monastery church dedicated to the English Saint Alban. The monastery ruins are still used for church ceremonies such as masses and weddings.
- Several Viking graves and the remains of an Iron Age long house have also been found on the south side of the island.

=== Vestkapp ===
The part of Norway's mainland that is farthest west is in Selje. The West Cape (Norwegian: Vestkapp) is 496 metres (1,627 ft) above sea level at the northwestern end of the Stadlandet peninsula. It is a precipitous rocky plateau, almost flat on top, that drops steeply down to the sea. In good weather, there is a panoramic view in all directions. It is immediately north of the village of Ervik.

=== Ervik ===
Ervik is located by the ocean near the West Cape at the end of the Stadlandet peninsula. The Ervik Church is located here in memory of those who died when the coastal express ship Sanct Svithun was wrecked here after being mistakenly bombed in 1943 by Canadian planes. Ervik has a fine sandy beach which is popular for surfing, and a river rich in trout and salmon.

== See also ==
- List of former municipalities of Norway
