= Fure =

Fure may refer to:

== People ==
- Ashley Fure (born 1982), American composer
- Julius Fure (1931–2006), Norwegian politician
- Odd-Bjørn Fure (1942–2022), Norwegian historian and political scientist
- Tret Fure (active from 1972), American singer-songwriter

== Other uses ==
- Mount Fure, a mountain in Japan

== See also ==
- Fure's Cabin, a historic log cabin in Alaska
