= Barmoya =

Barmoya may refer to:

- Barmoya, Queensland, a locality in Australia
- Barmøya, an island in Norway
