= Sogn og Fjordane Energi =

Power company in Norway

Sogn og Fjordane Energi AS
- Company type: Private
- Industry: Power
- Founded: 2003
- Headquarters: Sandane, Norway
- Area served: Nordfjord, Sunnfjord, and Sogn
- Key people: Ole Schanke Eikum (CEO); Arvid Bjarne Lillehauge (Chairman)
- Products: Hydroelectricity
- Revenue: ▲NOK 658 million (2006)
- Operating income: NOK 213 million (2006)
- Net income: NOK 101 million (2006)
- Number of employees: 500 (2007)
- Website: www.sfe.no

Sogn og Fjordane Energi or SFE is a power company that operates in the northern part of Vestland county, Norway. It operates ten hydroelectric power stations and the power grid in the municipalities of Askvoll, Bremanger, Gloppen, Kinn, Stad, and Sunnfjord. Annual average production is 1,263 gigawatt-hours (4,550 TJ).

The company was created in 2003 and is owned by Sogn og Fjordane Holding (49.5%), Eviny (36.8%), Kinn Municipality (4.64%), Gloppen Municipality (3.45%), Bremanger Municipality (2.47%), Stad Municipality (1.57%), Askvoll Municipality (1.48%), and Sunnfjord Municipality (0.08%). It was created after a merger of SFE, Ytre Fjordane Kraftlag, Gloppen Elektrisistetsverk, Firdakraft and Eid Energi.

SFE has six wholly owned power stations: Skorge, Skogheim, Øksenelvane, Skogheim, Sagefossen, Åskåra. It also owns a 35% stake in the Leirdøla power station. It also operates three power stations owned by Gloppen Municipality: Eidsfossen, Trysilfossen, and Evebøfossen.
