= Magne Aarøen =

Norwegian politician

Magne Aarøen (April 28, 1944 in Innvik Municipality – June 27, 2003) was a Norwegian politician for the Christian People's Party (KrF). He was elected to the Norwegian Parliament from Sogn og Fjordane in 2001.

He previously served as a deputy representative from 1981 to 1985 and 1993–1997, and was the mayor of Selje Municipality from 1981 to 1983.

== Parliamentary Committees ==
- 2001 - 2003 member of the Standing Committee on Social Affairs.
