= Skorge Hydroelectric Power Station =

Dam in Stad Municipality, Vestland, Norway

Skorge Power Station
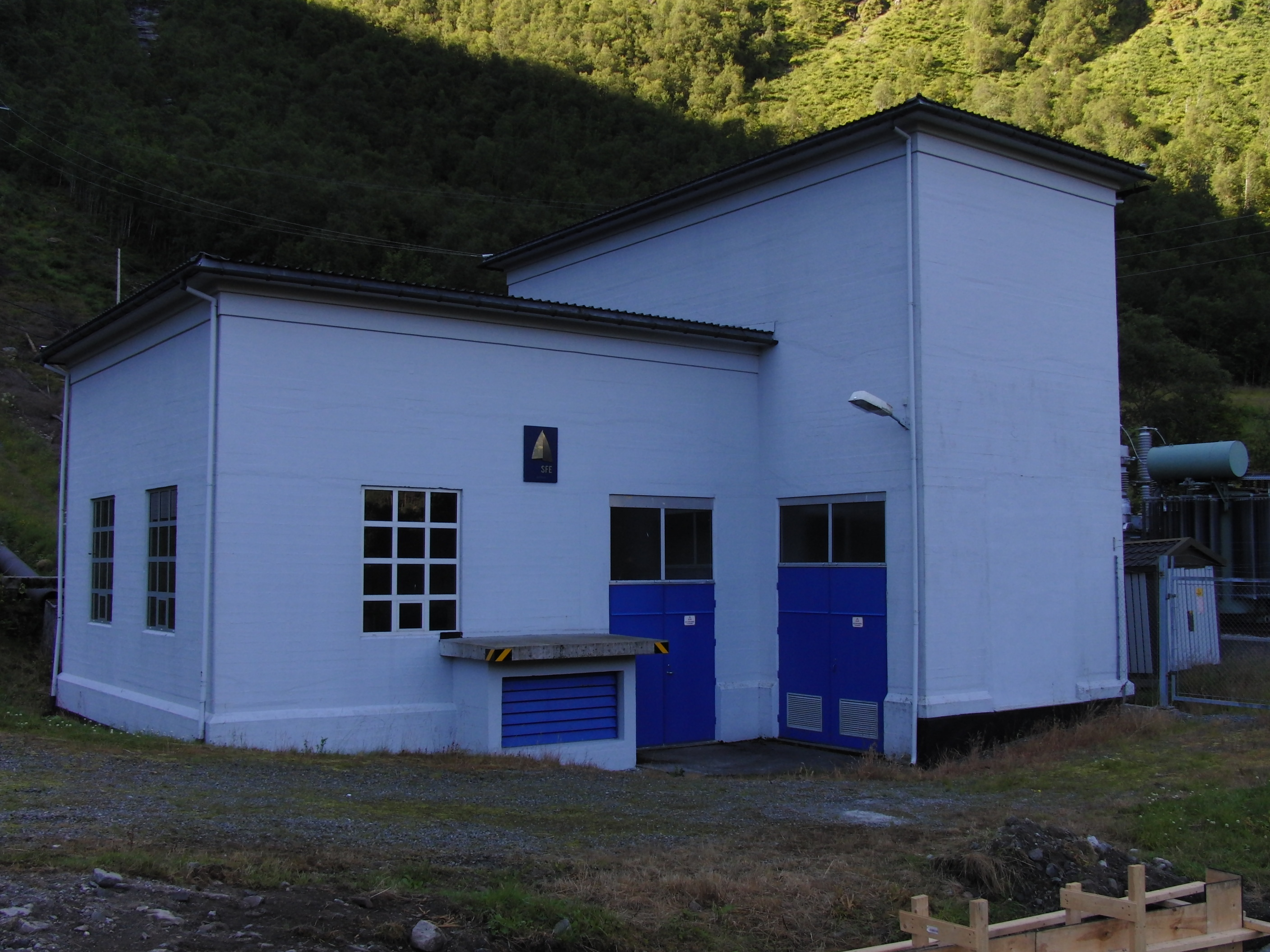
- Interactive map of Skorge Power Station
- Official name: Skorge kraftverk
- Country: Norway
- Location: Stad Municipality, Vestland
- Coordinates: 61°59′57″N 5°27′32″E
- Opening date: 1936; 90 years ago
- Owner: Sogn og Fjordane Energi

Upper reservoir
- Creates: Skorgevatnet (Lake Skorge)

Lower reservoir
- Creates: Kjødspollen (Kjøde Bay)

Power Station
- Hydraulic head: 350 m (1,150 ft)
- Installed capacity: 1.9 MW
- Annual generation: 6 GW·h

The Skorge Hydroelectric Power Station (Norwegian: Skorge kraftverk or Skorge kraftstasjon) is a hydroelectric power station in Stad Municipality in Vestland county, Norway. Part of its catchment area lies in the neighboring Vanylven Municipality.

It utilizes a drop of 350 meters (1,150 ft) between its intake reservoir at Skorgevatnet (Lake Skorge) and Kjødspollen (Kjøde Bay). The plant operates at an installed capacity of 1.9 megawatts (2,500 hp) using a Pelton wheel, with an average annual production of about 6 gigawatt-hours (22 TJ). It is owned by Sogn og Fjordane Energi and came into operation in 1936.
