= Ola M. Hestenes =

Norwegian politician

Ola M. Hestenes (3 August 1919 – 21 April 2008) was a Norwegian politician for the Centre Party.

On the local level, he served as mayor of Gloppen Municipality from 1968 to 1976. Following the 1975 elections, the first time county mayors were up for election, Hestenes became the new county mayor (fylkesordfører) of Sogn og Fjordane. 11 years later he lost the post following the 1987 elections.

Political offices
Preceded by Leif Iversen	County mayor of Sogn og Fjordane; 1976–1987	Succeeded by Julius Fure
