= Flatraket =

Village in Stad Municipality, Norway

- Village
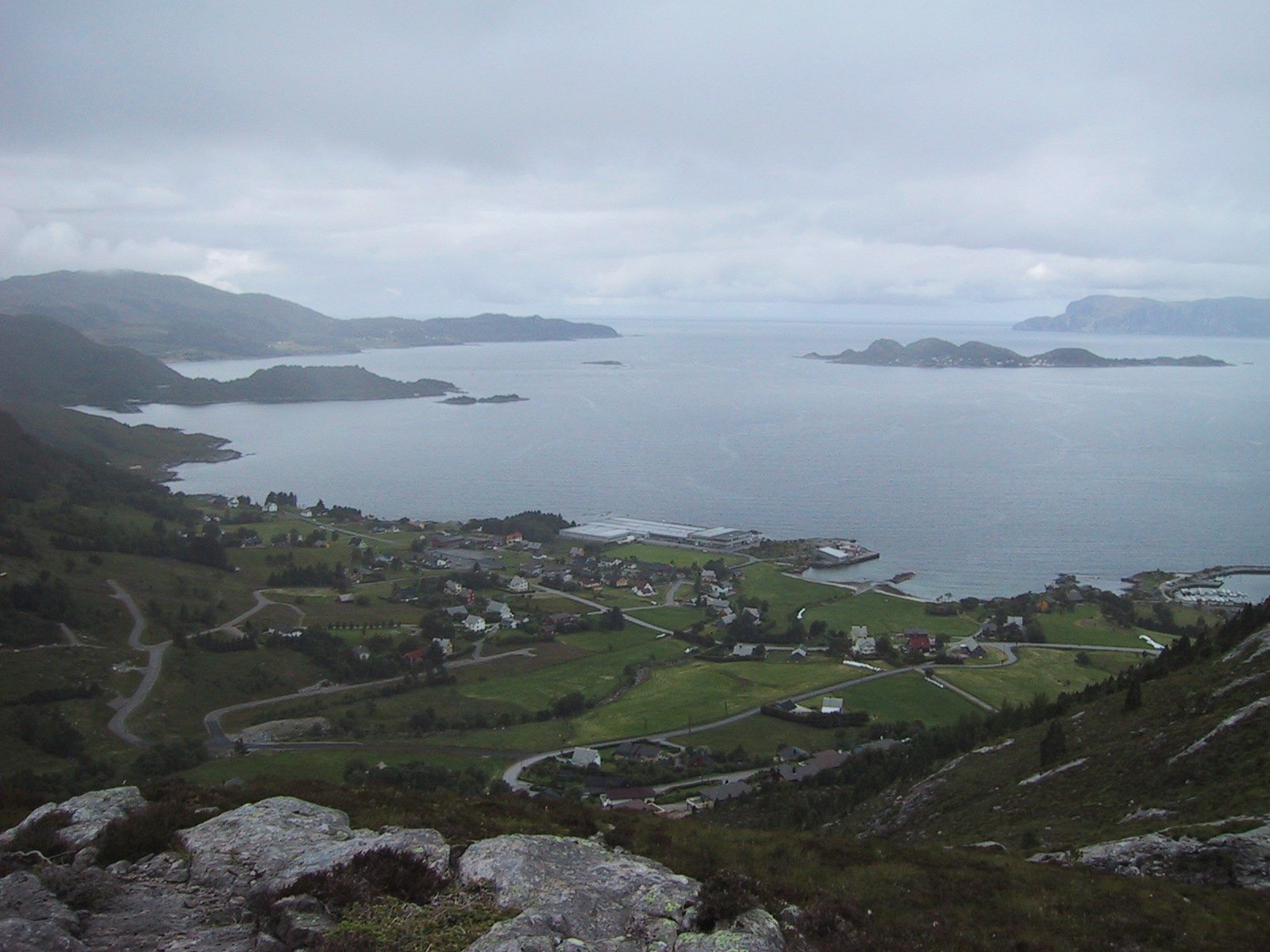
- View of the village
- Interactive map of Flatraket
- Location within Vestland Location within Norway
- Coordinates: 61.9739°N 5.2297°E
- Country: Norway
- Region: Western Norway
- County: Vestland
- District: Nordfjord
- Municipality: Stad Municipality

Area
  - Total: 0.31 km^{2} (0.12 sq mi)
- Elevation: 17 m (56 ft)

Population (2024)
  - Total: 305
  - Density: 984/km^{2} (2,550/sq mi)
- Time zone: UTC+01:00 (CET)
  - Summer (DST): UTC+02:00 (CEST)
- Post Code: 6717 Flatraket

Flatraket is a small village in Stad Municipality in Vestland county, Norway. The village is located about 16 kilometres (9.9 mi) northeast of the town of Måløy (in Kinn Municipality), about 4 kilometres (2.5 mi) northwest of the village of Håvik, and about 30 kilometres (19 mi) southwest of the village of Selje. Flatraket has a good view of the island of Silda and the Stadlandet peninsula.

The 0.31-square-kilometre (77-acre) village has a population (2024) of 305 and a population density of 984 inhabitants per square kilometre (2,550/sq mi).

Traditionally, fishing and agriculture have been important for this village, and the largest business there now is AS Fiskevegn. Flatraket has a school, a kindergarten, and a grocery store.
