= Håvik =

Village in Stad Municipality, Norway

- Village
- Interactive map of Håvik
- Location within Vestland Location within Norway
- Coordinates: 61.9586°N 5.2706°E
- Country: Norway
- Region: Western Norway
- County: Vestland
- District: Nordfjord
- Municipality: Stad Municipality
- Elevation: 6 m (20 ft)
- Time zone: UTC+01:00 (CET)
  - Summer (DST): UTC+02:00 (CEST)
- Post Code: 6717 Flatraket

Håvik is a small village in Stad Municipality, in Vestland county, Norway. Håvik has approximately 35 inhabitants. Håvik has a high mountain at one side and the Nordpollen fjord right on the other side of the little village. Neighbouring villages are Flatraket, Nordpollen, Vengen, and Vetrhus. The closest store is at Flatraket, approximately a 4 kilometres (2.5 mi) drive to the northwest. Håvik is about a 20 kilometres (12 mi) drive from the town of Måløy in neighboring Kinn Municipality to the west and about the same distance to the village of Selje to the north.

== History ==
Håvik is an old name (formerly written as Haavig) and comes from the high mountains "behind" the village, hå is an old Norwegian word for "high" and vik means "bay", therefore Håvik has high mountains by a bay.

In the mountains of Håvik, there is a cave with visible signs of early living. A handcrafted cup of stone was found and delivered to the Historic Museum in Bergen during the 1970s. In earlier days, the people in Håvik, made their living like many other villages along the Norwegian coast by a combination of fishing and farming. Today there are no longer any farming activities and the inhabitants all have jobs in the larger communities nearby.
