= Selje Church =

Church in Vestland, Norway

- Selje kyrkje
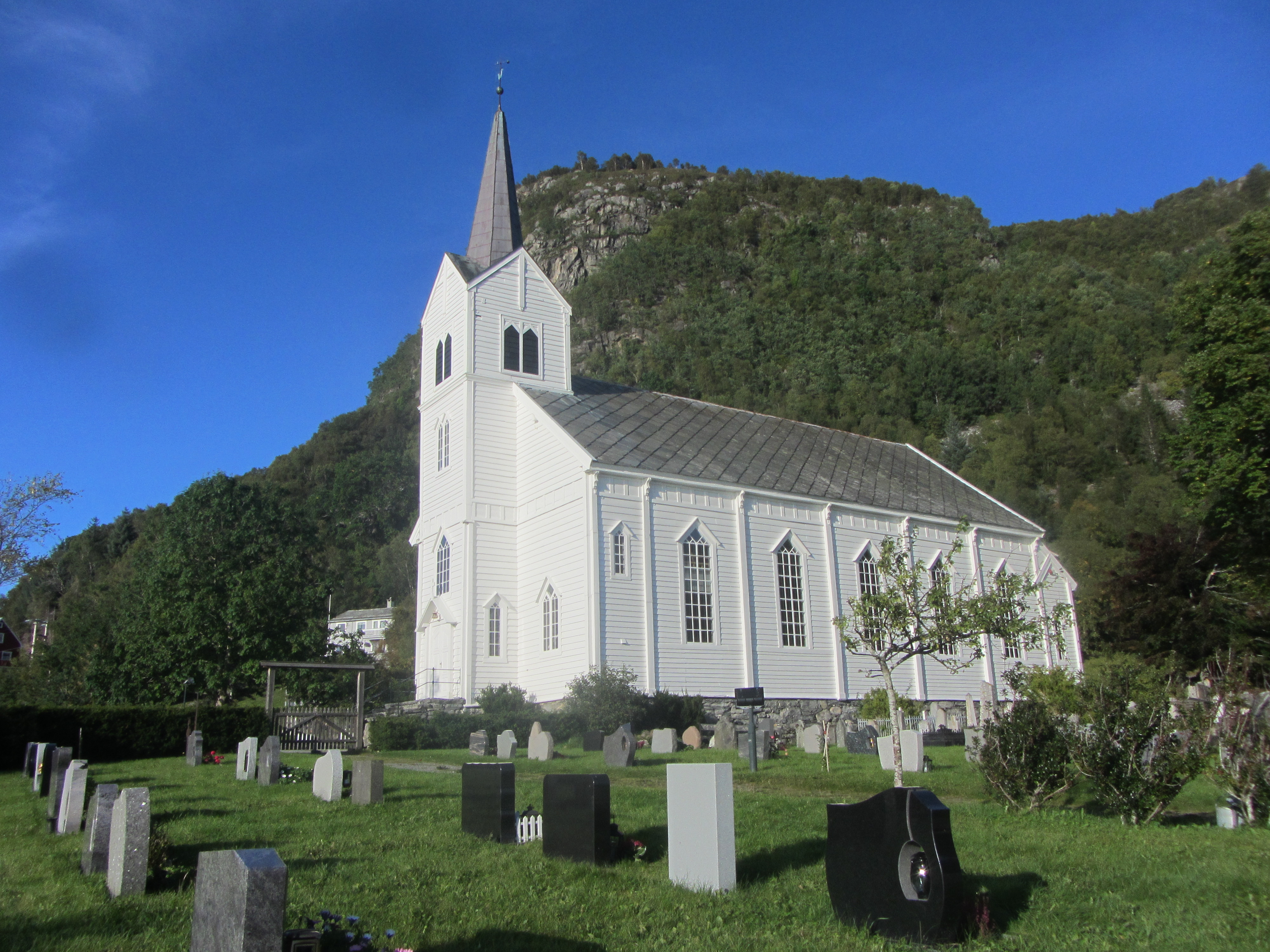
- View of the church
- Selje Church
- 62°02′57″N 5°20′54″E
- Location: Stad Municipality, Vestland
- Country: Norway
- Denomination: Church of Norway
- Churchmanship: Evangelical Lutheran

History
- Former name: Sellø kirke
- Status: Parish church
- Founded: 10th century
- Consecrated: 13 May 1866

Architecture
- Functional status: Active
- Architect: Frederik Hannibal Stockfleth
- Architectural type: Long church
- Completed: 1866 (160 years ago)

Specifications
- Capacity: 420
- Materials: Wood

Administration
- Diocese: Bjørgvin bispedømme
- Deanery: Nordfjord prosti
- Parish: Selje
- Norwegian Cultural Heritage Site
- Type: Church
- Status: Listed
- ID: 85417

Selje Church (Norwegian: Selje kyrkje) is a parish church of the Church of Norway in Stad Municipality in Vestland county, Norway. It is located in the village of Selje. It is the church for the Selje parish which is part of the Nordfjord prosti (deanery) in the Diocese of Bjørgvin. The white, wooden church was built in a long church design in 1866 using plans drawn up by the architect Frederik Hannibal Stockfleth. The church seats about 420 people.

== History ==
The earliest existing historical records of the church date back to around the year 1100, but the church may have been built as early as the year 996. Selje Church is mentioned in the 10th century saga, Óláfs saga Tryggvasonar. The first church in Selje was located on the small island of Selja, just off the coast of the present-day village of Selje. From the 12th until the 16th century, the old Selje Abbey was a major religious center for the region. Around the 1100s, the old church was moved to the village of Bø on the island of Selja, not far from the Abbey and it was rebuilt as a wooden stave church. This church was located on the south side of the island, and it was known as the Fylkeskyrkja (the county church). The church had a nave that measured about 12.5 by 10 metres (41 ft × 33 ft) and a choir that measured about 5 by 6 metres (16 ft × 20 ft). By the year 1340, the church was described by the archbishop as being in poor condition due to neglect. By the mid-1500s, the small island was no longer inhabited and parishioners had to travel by boat to the church from the mainland. Due to its age and condition, and that there were no longer residents on the island, in 1654 it was decided to tear down the church and to build a replacement church at Hove on the mainland, about 1.5 kilometres (0.93 mi) across the bay, approximately where the present church stands today. The new church was completed in 1654 and the old church was also torn down that year.

In 1814, this church served as an election church (Norwegian: valgkirke). Together with more than 300 other parish churches across Norway, it was a polling station for elections to the 1814 Norwegian Constituent Assembly which wrote the Constitution of Norway. This was Norway's first national elections. Each church parish was a constituency that elected people called "electors" who later met together in each county to elect the representatives for the assembly that was to meet at Eidsvoll Manor later that year.

In 1865, it was decided that the old church was in need of replacement. The new church was designed by Frederik Hannibal Stockfleth and the lead builder was Rasmus Sætre from the nearby Stryn Municipality. The builder was paid 6150 speciedaler for the work. Construction of the new church took place during the winter of 1865, right next to the old church. It was completed by the April of 1866. The last worship service in the old church took place on 22 April 1866. The new building was consecrated on 13 May 1866 by the Bishop Peter Hersleb Graah Birkeland. The old church was then taken down and moved to Leikanger where it was rebuilt become the present Leikanger Church. At the time of its completion in 1866, the new church was one of the largest in the Diocese of Bergenhus. The nave measured 34 by 14 metres (112 ft × 46 ft) and a ceiling height of 7.2 metres (24 ft). The choir had a sacristy built on either side of it. The new church was renovated and expanded in 1887 and 1895. In 1954, electric lights and heating was added to the building. The church was renovated again in 1966.

== Media gallery ==
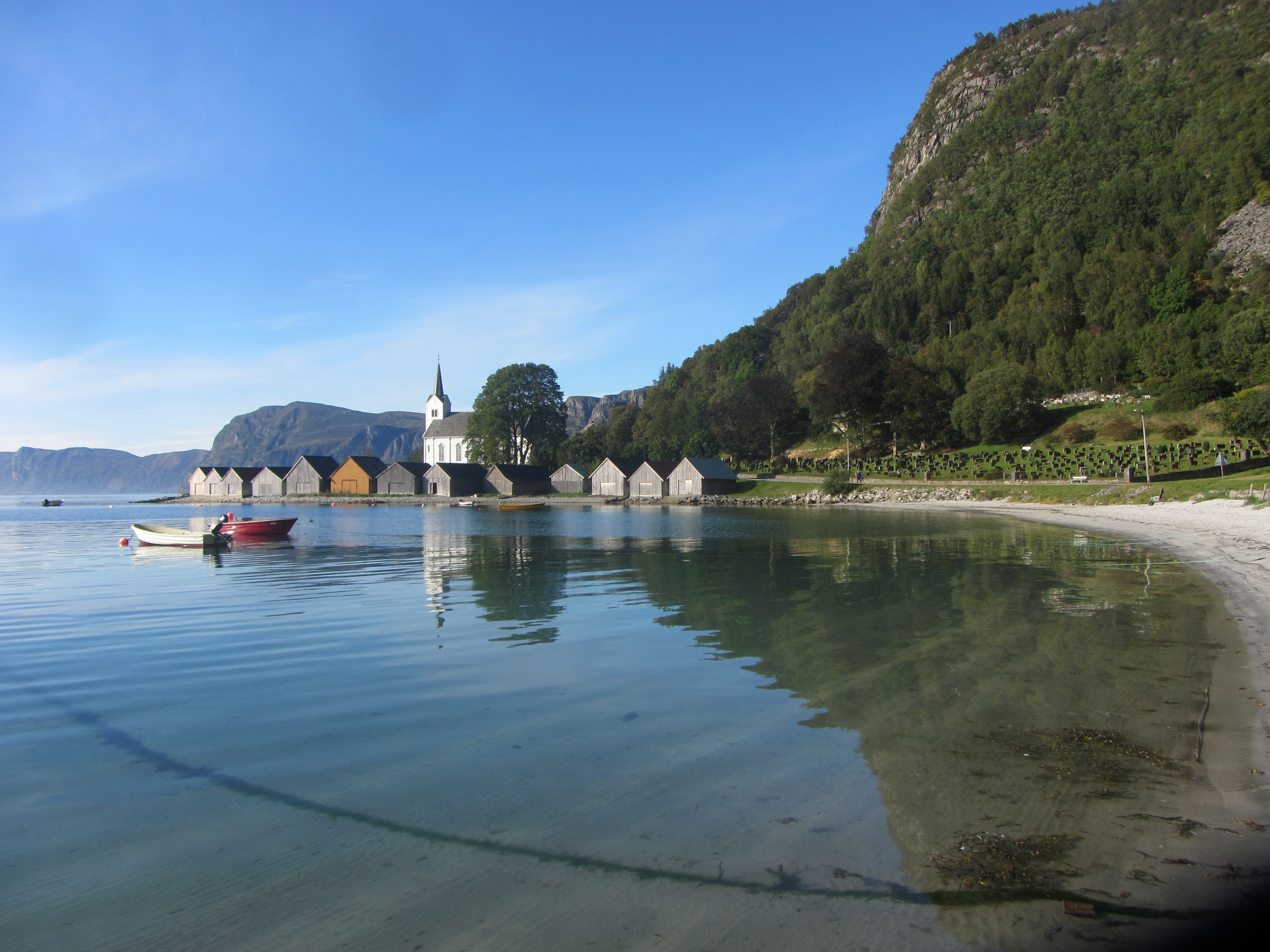

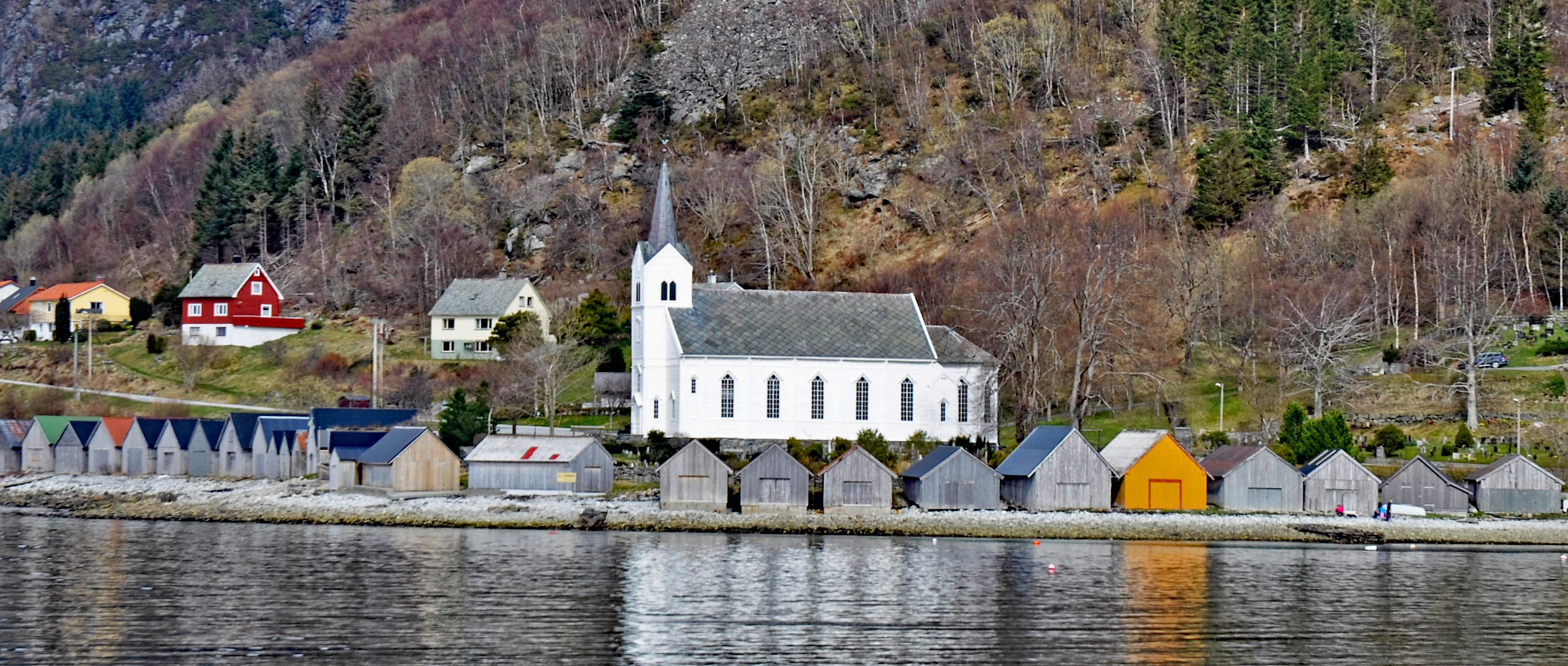

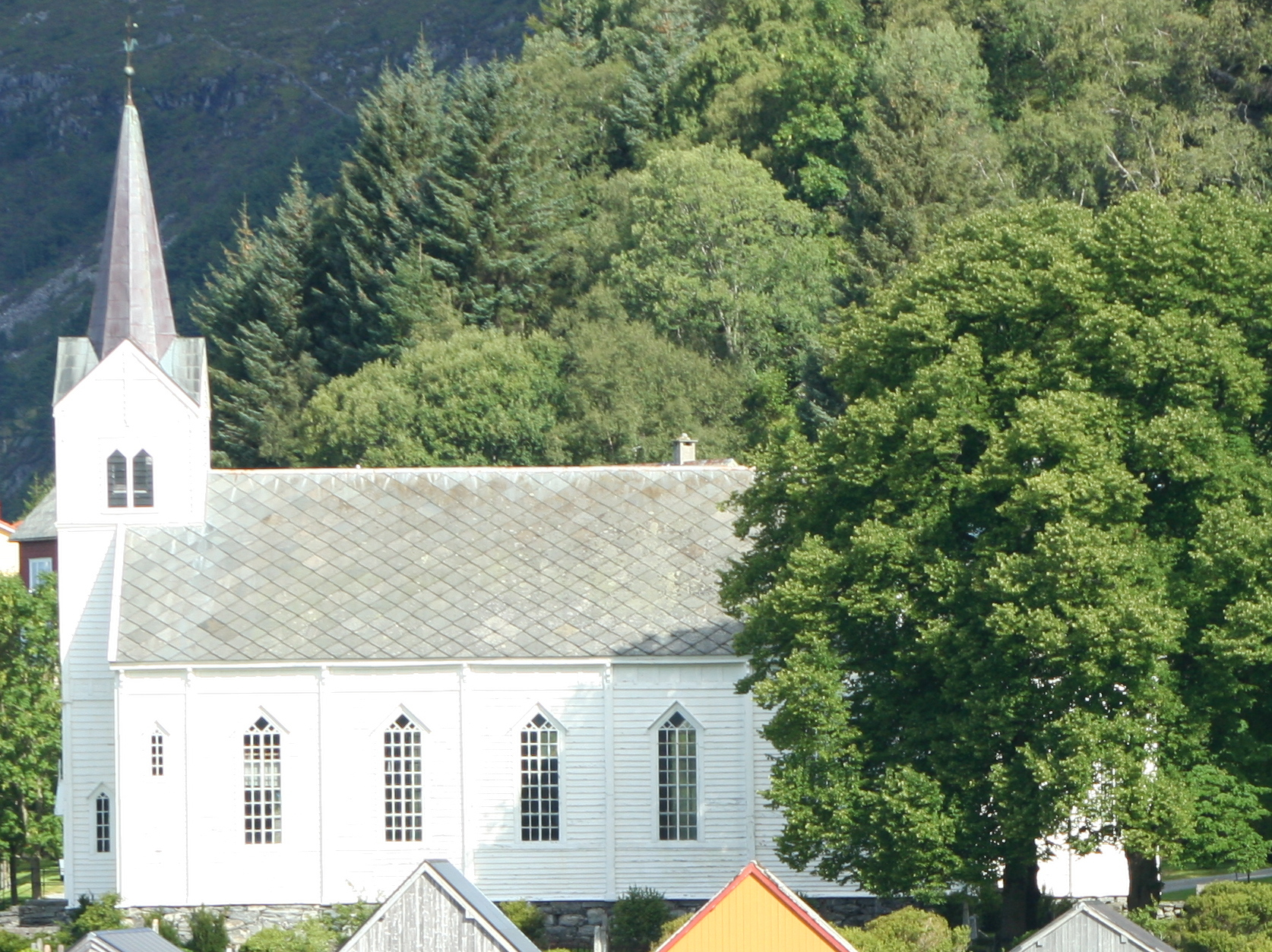

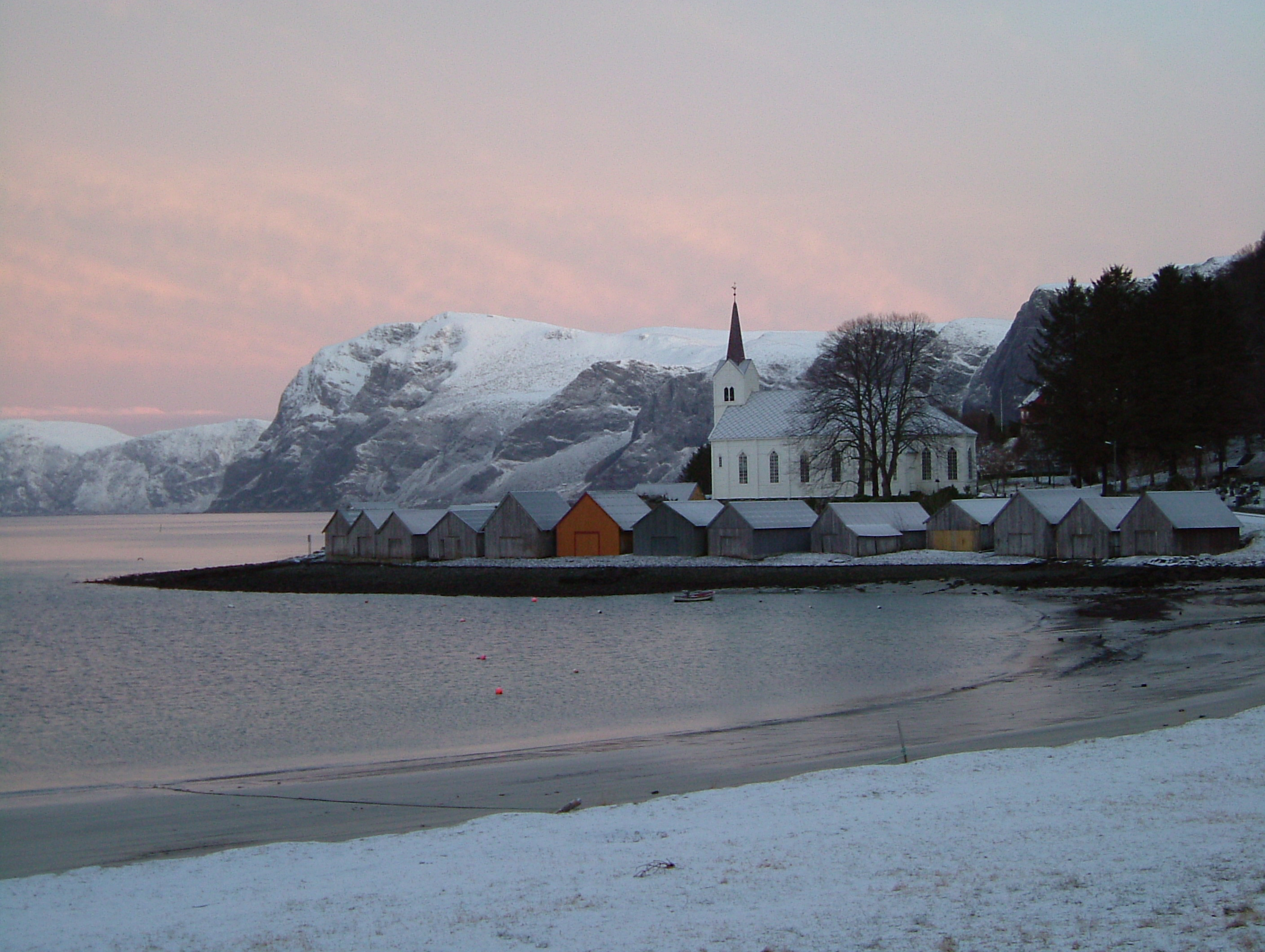
Winter view of the church

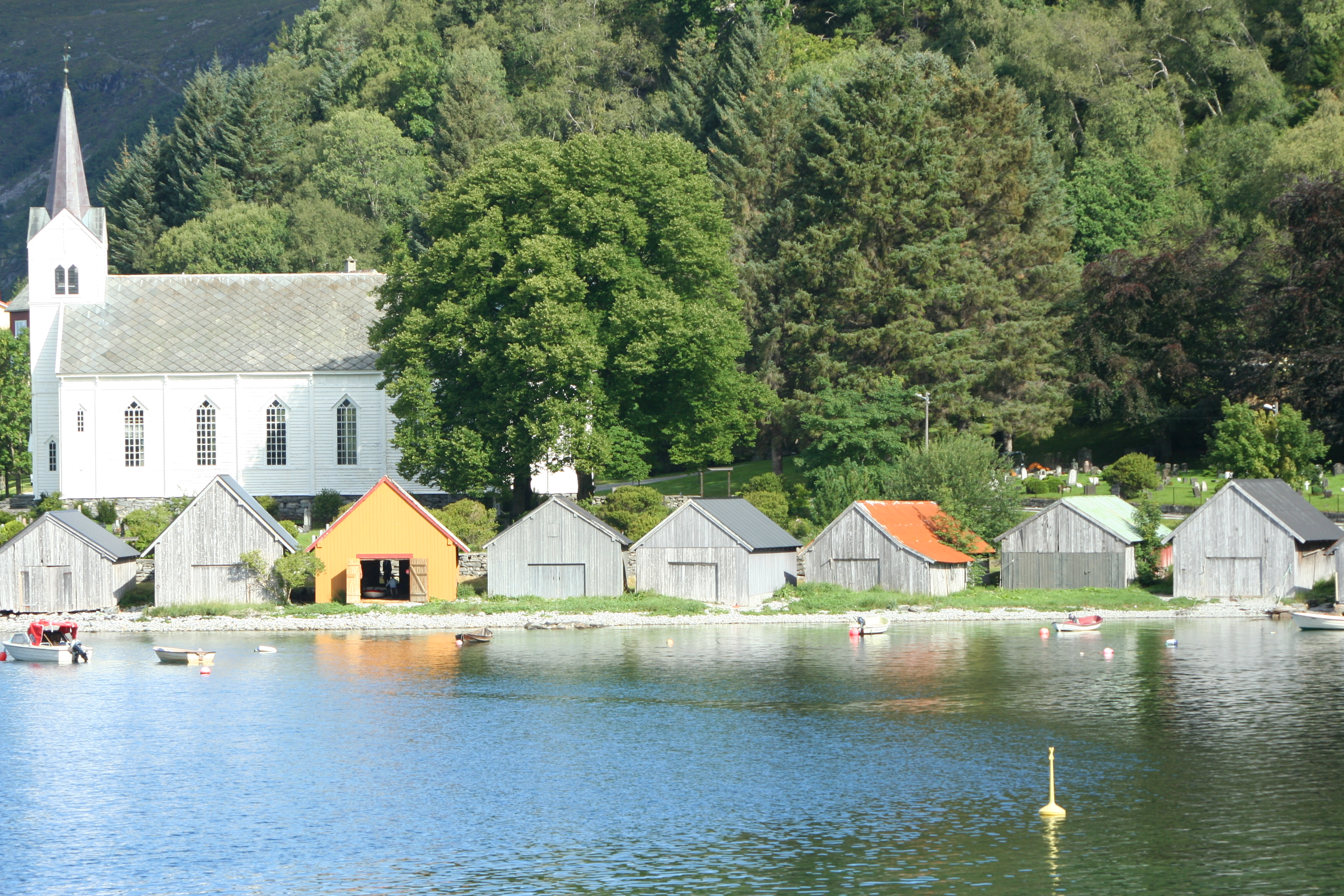
View of the church with small boat houses along the shore

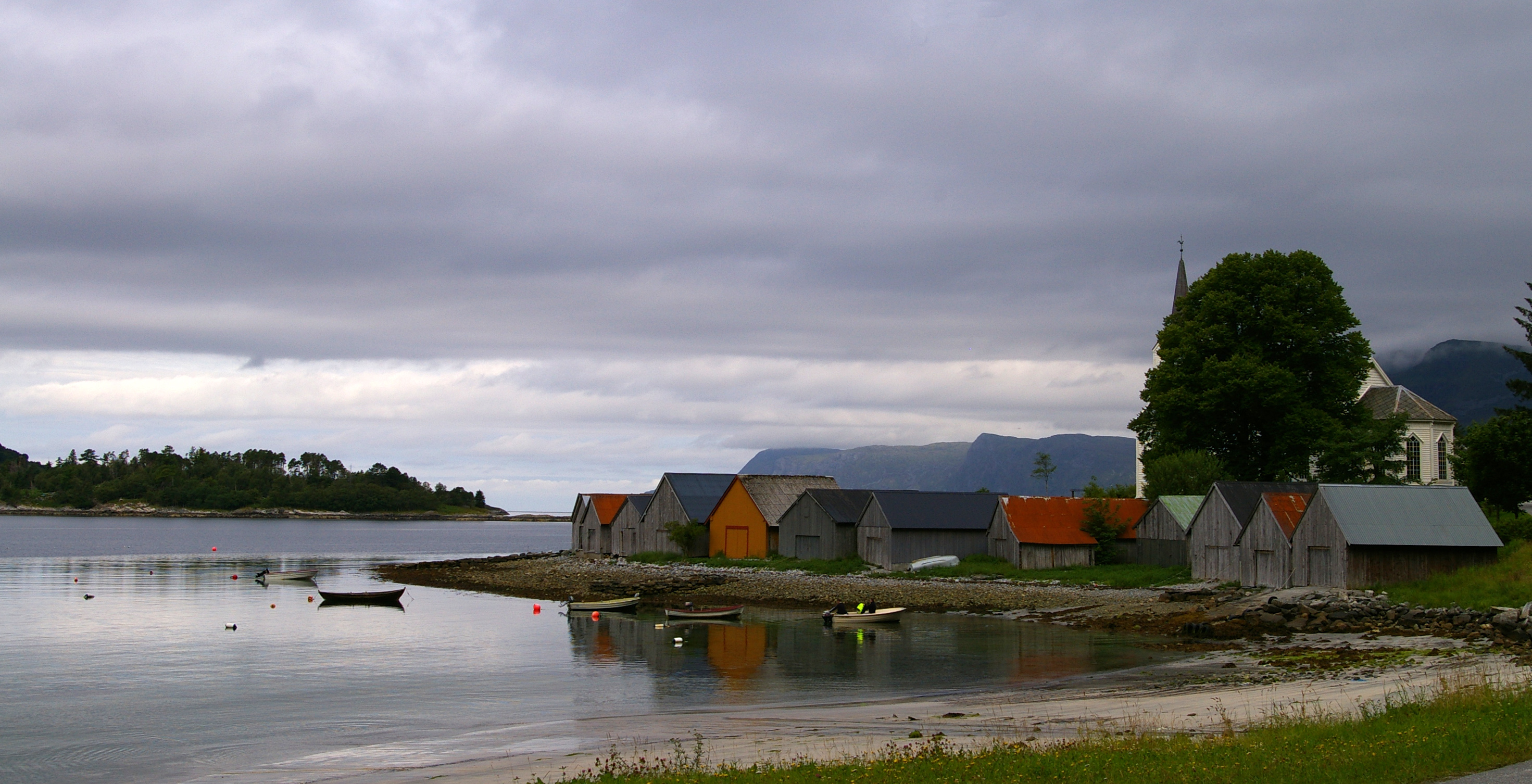
View from the southeast

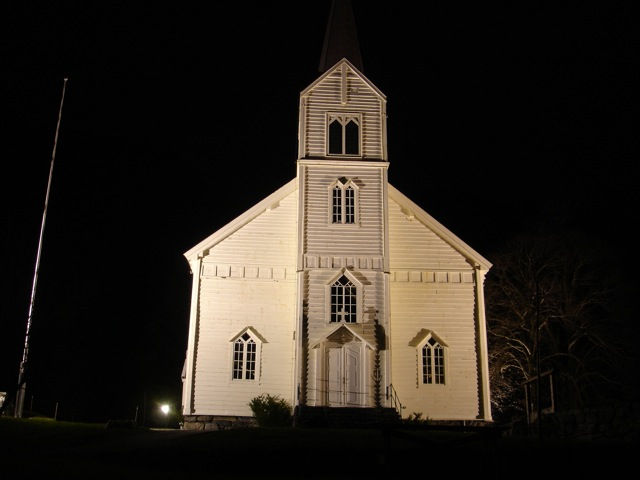
Front of the church

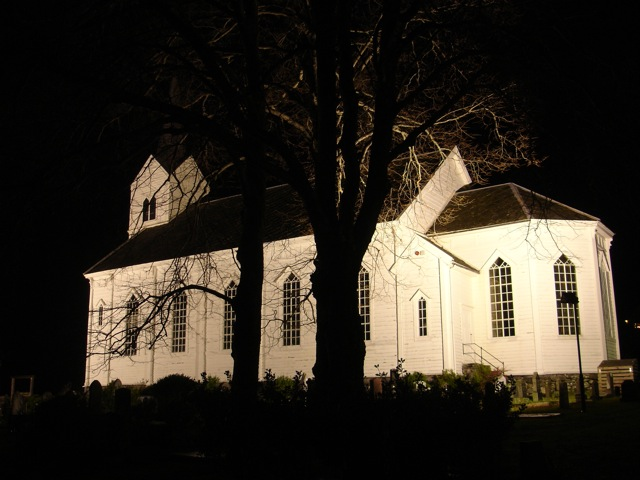
Side view of the church

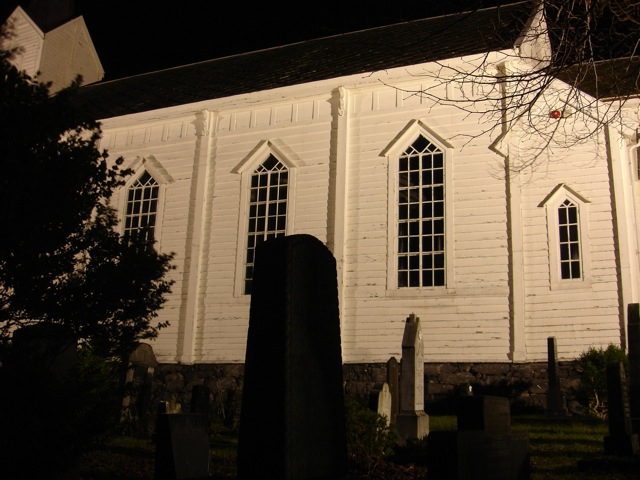
Close up side view of the church

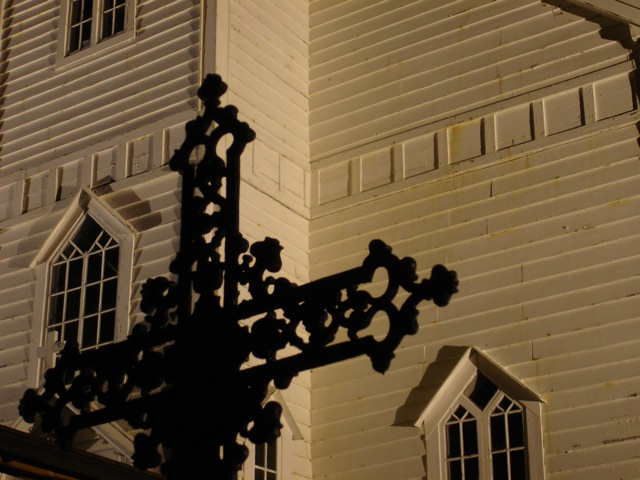
Close up of the church

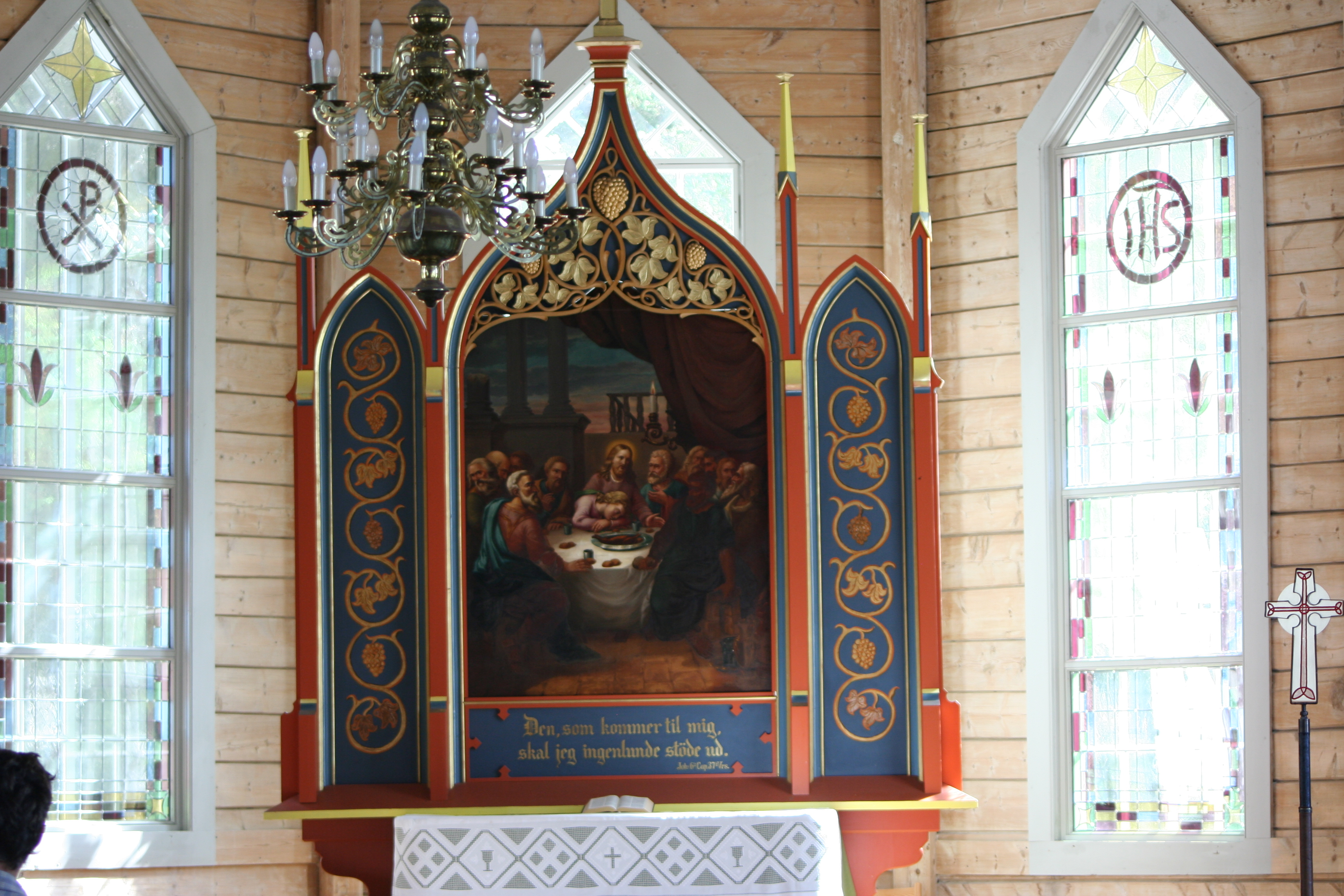
Interior view of altar table

== See also ==
- List of churches in Bjørgvin
