= Julius Fure =

Norwegian politician

Julius Fure (19 December 1931 – 18 March 2006) was a Norwegian politician for the Conservative Party.

He served as mayor of Selje Municipality from 1968 to 1971 and 1976 to 1982. He was also elected to the county council. He served for the first time from 1968 to 1971, and was elected in 1976 for a protest list. He later sat from 1980 to 1996 for the Conservative Party. He became deputy county mayor in 1984, and then county mayor in 1988. He lost the mayor post following the 1991 elections, but remained a county council member until 1995. At the nomination that year, he was not re-nominated at all, since the nomination committee prioritized Anne Margrethe Øvsthus on the ticket, and Fure refused to be placed lower than first place.

Julius Fure was the older brother of historian Odd-Bjørn Fure, and lived at Stadlandet. He was a (non-executive) member of the boards of Widerøe's Flyveselskap and Ytre Fjordane Kraftlag, and chairman of the board of Fylkesbaatane. He died in 2006.

Political offices
Preceded by Ola M. Hestenes	County mayor of Sogn og Fjordane; 1988–1991	Succeeded by Sjur Hopperstad
