= Hoddevika =

Hoddevika Hoddevik (unofficial)
- Village
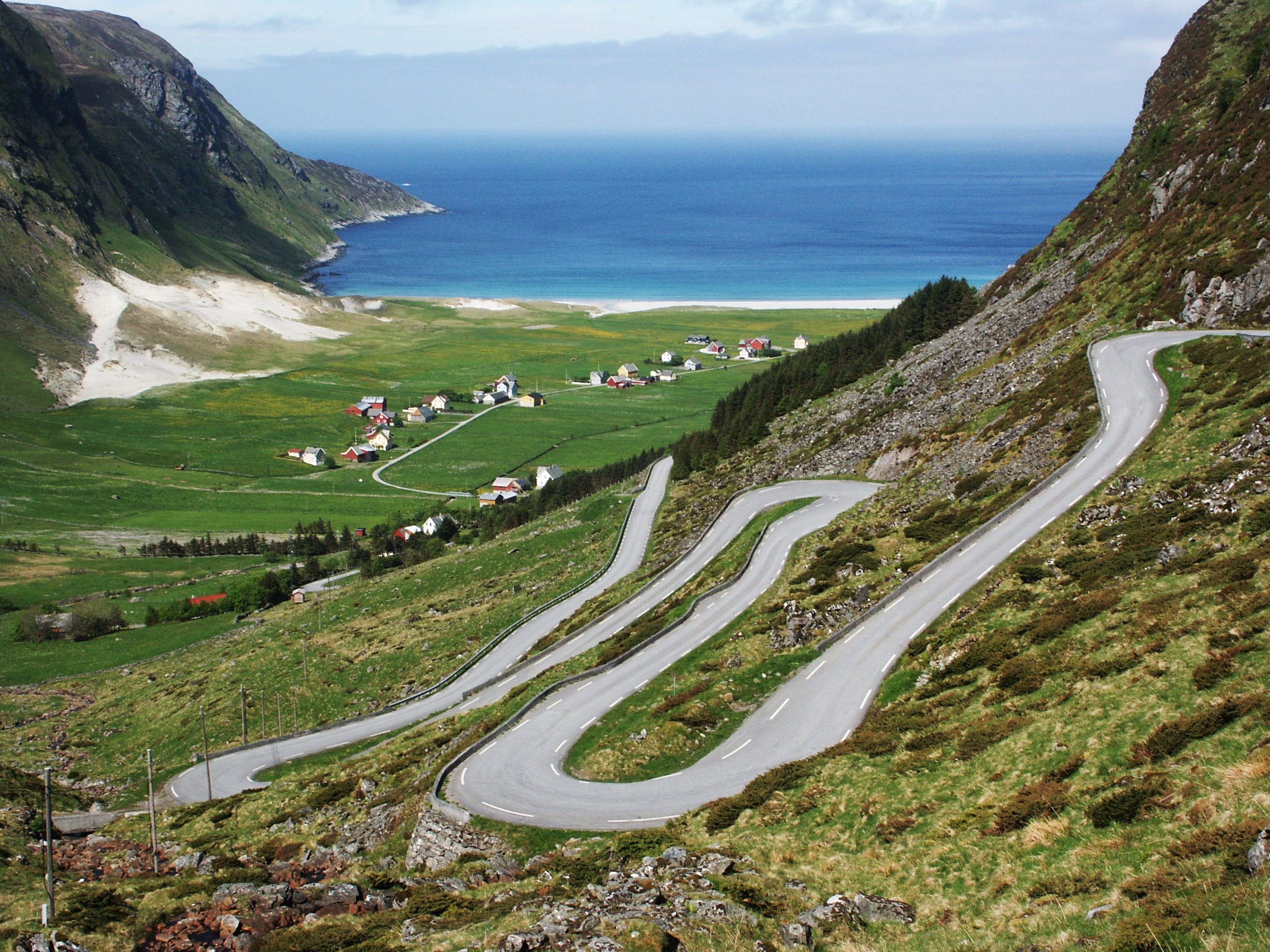
- View of the village valley, from access road.
- Interactive map of Hoddevika
- Location within Vestland Location within Norway
- Coordinates: 62.12311°N 5.1677°E
- Country: Norway
- Region: Western Norway
- County: Vestland
- District: Nordfjord
- Municipality: Stad Municipality
- Elevation: 8 m (26 ft)
- Time zone: UTC+01:00 (CET)
  - Summer (DST): UTC+02:00 (CEST)
- Post Code: 6750 Stadlandet

Hoddevika is a village and surf beach in Stad Municipality in Vestland county, Norway. The village is located on the western coast of the Stadlandet peninsula.

Hoddevika has good surf as it is exposed to west swells, but remains very wind-sheltered due to the surrounding high mountains. The white sand beach and a local surf-hostel add to Hoddevika's appeal.

Around 14 people live year-round in the village (as of 2022).
