= Odd-Bjørn Fure =

Norwegian historian and political scientist (1942–2022)

Odd-Bjørn Fure (5 March 1942 – 22 December 2022) was a Norwegian historian and political scientist.

He was born at Stadlandet, and was a brother of politician Julius Fure (1931–2006). His main studies were in comparative politics, but he switched field with a 1983 doctoral thesis on the history of the Norwegian labour movement between 1918 and 1920. He had not previously studied history.

After having had several positions, Fure became professor in modern history at the University of Bergen from 1998 to 2002. He was then appointed director of research at the Norwegian Center for Studies of Holocaust and Religious Minorities. From 2002 to 2004 Fure was editor of Historisk Tidsskrift, a Norwegian journal for scientific historical research. He was a member of the Norwegian Academy of Science and Letters.

Fure was a specialist in research on genocide, as well as modern German and European history. In 1997 Fure engaged in the Norwegian debate on David Irving against Hans Fredrik Dahl. Dahl would later recall his recommendation of Irving's works, but only after Irving lost his lawsuit against Deborah Lipstadt.

Sure died on 22 December 2022, at the age of 80.
