= Barmøya =

Island in Norway

Barmøya Barmen
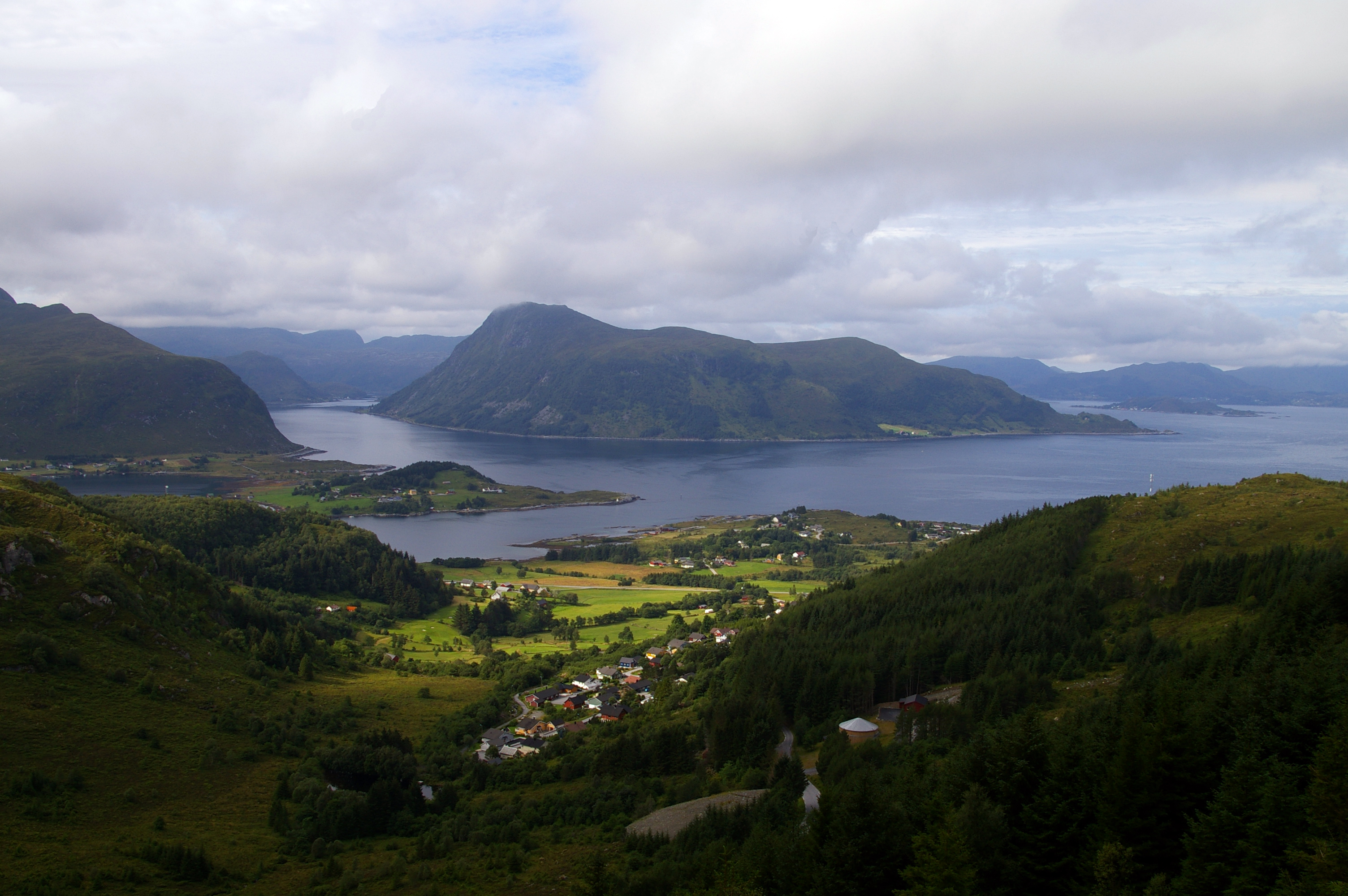
- Interactive map of Barmøya; Barmen

Geography
- Location: Vestland, Norway
- Coordinates: 62.0126°N 5.2826°E
- Area: 9 km^{2} (3.5 sq mi)
- Length: 3.5 km (2.17 mi)
- Width: 3.5 km (2.17 mi)
- Highest elevation: 545 m (1788 ft)
- Highest point: Skjolden

Administration
- Norway
- County: Vestland
- Municipality: Stad Municipality

Barmøya or Barmen is a small island in Stad Municipality in Vestland county, Norway. The 9-square-kilometre (3.5 sq mi) island lies just off the mainland between the Stad peninsula and the island of Vågsøy. Most of the island's 50 or so residents live on the southern shore in a small village that is known as Barmen. There is a small car ferry that runs from Barmen to the mainland 1.5 kilometres (0.93 mi) to the south. The eastern half of the island is made up of the 545-metre (1,788 ft) tall mountain Skjolden.

== See also ==
- List of islands of Norway
