= Stad Municipality =

Municipality in Vestland, Norway

Stad Municipality Stad kommune
- Municipality
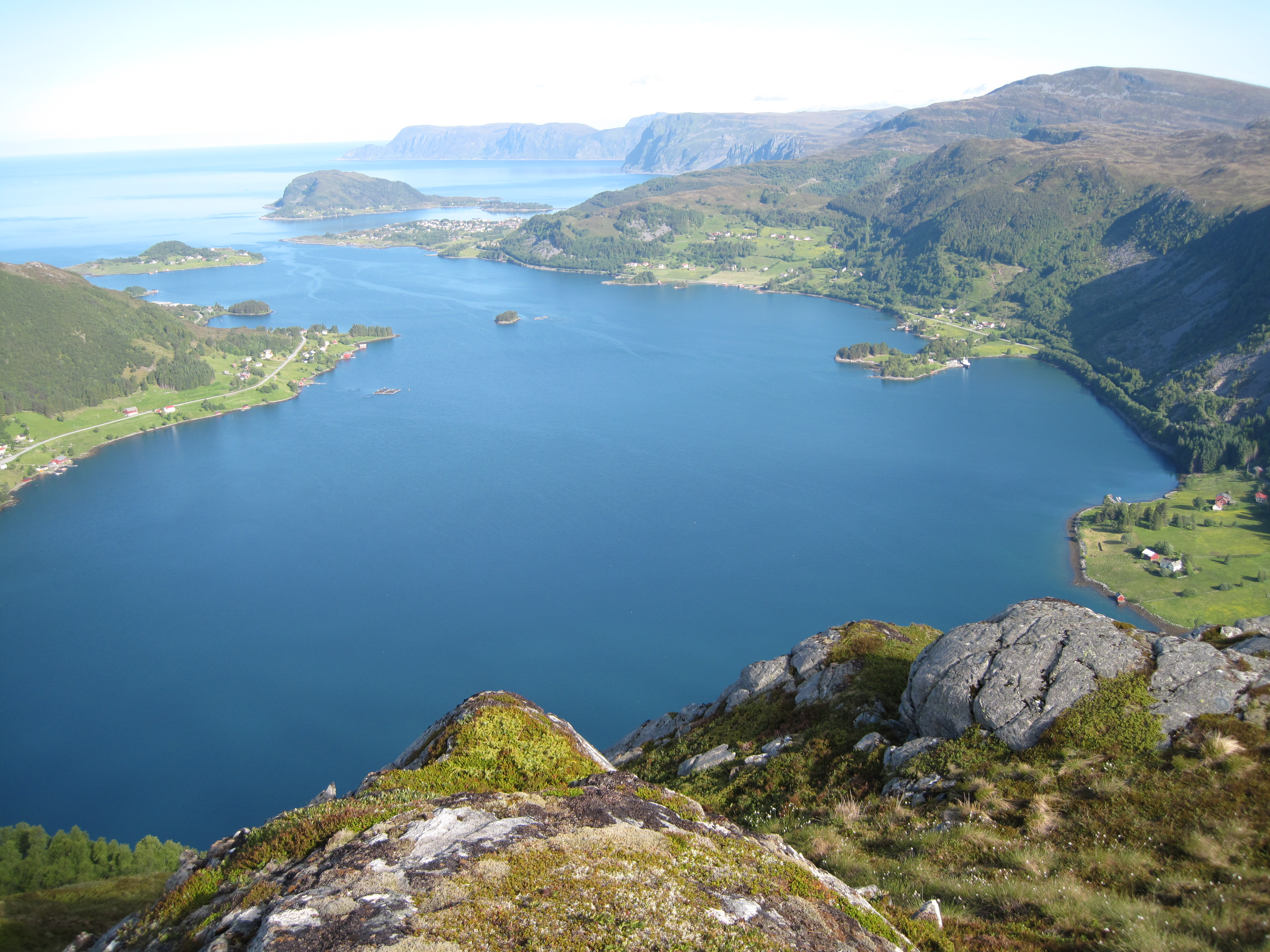
- View of the Selje area and the Stad peninsula

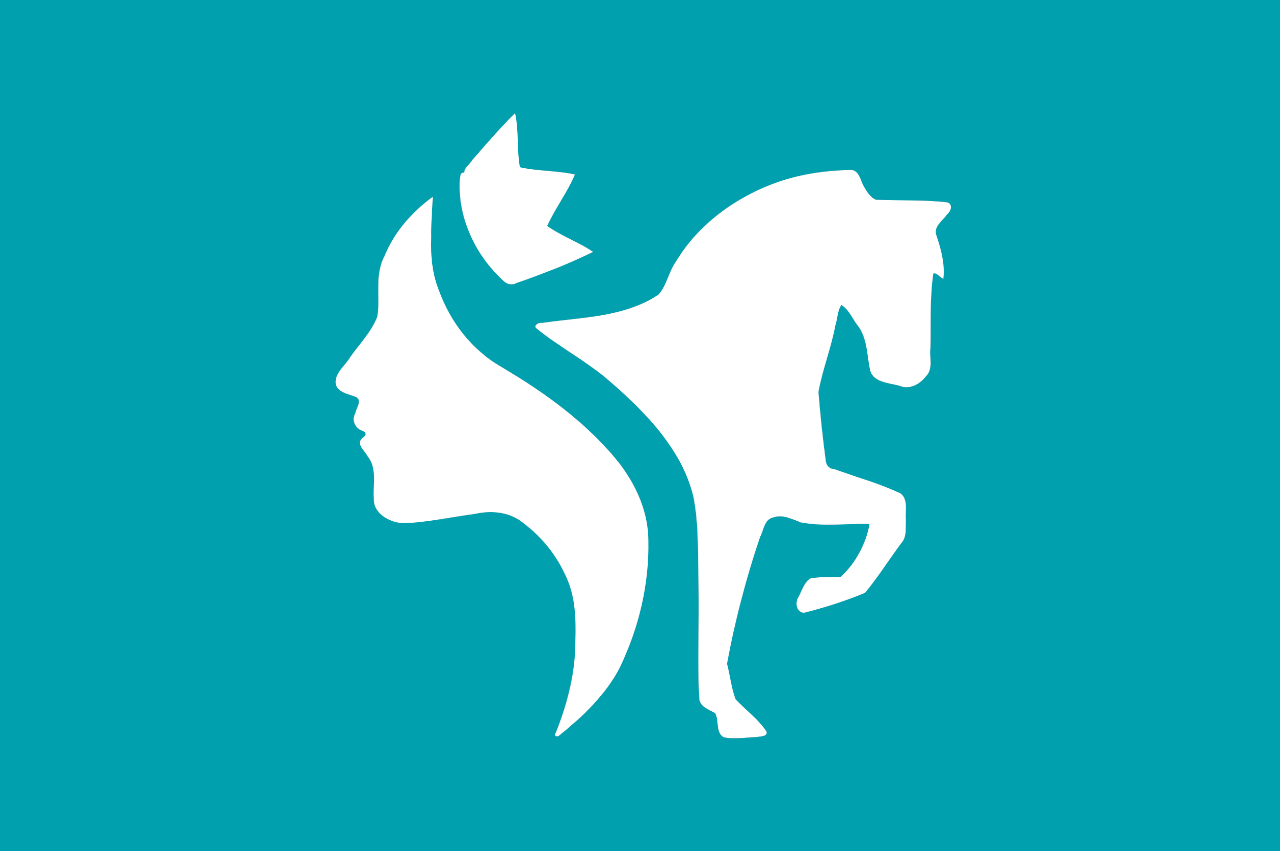
- Flag Coat of arms

- Vestland within Norway

- Stad within Vestland
- Coordinates: 61.91139°N 6.03722°E
- Country: Norway
- County: Vestland
- District: Nordfjord
- Established: 1 Jan 2020
  - Preceded by: Selje, Eid, Vågsøy
- Administrative centre: Nordfjordeid

Government
  - Mayor (2024): Judith Kvåle (Ap)

Area
  - Total: 752.78 km^{2} (290.65 sq mi)
  - Land: 694.53 km^{2} (268.16 sq mi)
  - Water: 58.25 km^{2} (22.49 sq mi) 7.7%
  - Rank: #152 in Norway
- Highest elevation: 1,297.17 m (4,255.8 ft)

Population (2025)
  - Total: 9,655
  - Rank: #119 in Norway
  - Density: 12.8/km^{2} (33/sq mi)
  - Change (10 years): ▲ +10.4%
- Demonym: Stadværing

Official language
  - Norwegian form: Nynorsk
- Time zone: UTC+01:00 (CET)
  - Summer (DST): UTC+02:00 (CEST)
- ISO 3166 code: NO-4649
- Website: Official website

Stad is a municipality in Vestland county, Norway. It is located in the traditional district of Nordfjord. The municipality includes much of the northern shore of the Nordfjorden as well as the Stadlandet peninsula. The administrative centre of the municipality is the village of Nordfjordeid. Other villages in the municipality include Selje, Barmen, Ervik, Flatraket, Hoddevik, Hoddevika, Håvik, Leikanger, Mogrenda, Stårheim, Haugen, Kjølsdalen, Heggjabygda, and Lote.

The 752.78-square-kilometre (290.65 sq mi) municipality is the 152nd largest by area out of the 357 municipalities in Norway. Stad Municipality is the 119th most populous municipality in Norway with a population of 9,543. The municipality's population density is 12.8 inhabitants per square kilometre (33/sq mi) and its population has increased by 10.4% over the previous 10-year period.

The Stad Ship Tunnel is a planned canal and tunnel to bypass the Stad peninsula in Stad Municipality. When built it will be the first full-size ship tunnel in the world and will allow boats to avoid traveling around the Stad peninsula which is a particularly dangerous sea route.

== General information ==
The municipality of Stad was established on 1 January 2020 when Selje Municipality, Eid Municipality, and the Bryggja area of Vågsøy Municipality were merged to form one large municipality.

=== Name ===
The municipality is named after the Stad peninsula (Old Norse: Staðr) which is located in the western part of the municipality. The name is identical to the word staðr which means "stop", "halt", or "hesitation". The name possibly was used for the peninsula because of the rough waters around it which often caused seafarers here to wait for better weather.

=== Coat of arms ===
The coat of arms was granted on 15 May 2019 for use starting on 1 January 2020 when the municipality was established. The arms have a teal-colored field (background) and the charge is a two-part design with St. Sunniva on the left and a fjord horse on the right. The charge has a tincture of argent which means it is commonly colored white, but if it is made out of metal, then silver is used. The arms are an informal impalement of the old arms of the Selje Municipality and Eid Municipality which were merged in 2020 to form Stad. These two figures were chosen because the region is well known for its own race of horses, called the Fjording, that are very common and popular in the area. The Fjording is characterised by its white and black mane. The woman is a depiction of Saint Sunniva, the royal Irish missionary who died as a martyr on the island of Selja while trying to convert the locals to Christianity. Later, the Selje Abbey was built on the spot where she died. She was later named the patron saint of the Norwegian Diocese of Bjørgvin and all of Western Norway. The municipal flag has the same design as the coat of arms.

=== Churches ===
The Church of Norway has six parishes (sokn) within Stad Municipality. It is part of the Nordfjord prosti (deanery) in the Diocese of Bjørgvin.

Churches in Stad Municipality
| Parish (sokn) | Church name | Location of the church | Year built |
|---|---|---|---|
| Eid | Eid Church | Nordfjordeid | 1849 |
| Eid | Heggjabygda Church | Heggjabygda | 1936 |
| Ervik | Ervik Church | Ervik | 1970 |
| Kjølsdalen | Kjølsdalen Church | Kjølsdalen | 1940 |
| Leikanger | Leikanger Church | Leikanger | 1866 |
| Selje | Selje Church | Selje | 1866 |
| Stårheim | Stårheim Church | Stårheim | 1864 |

== Geography ==
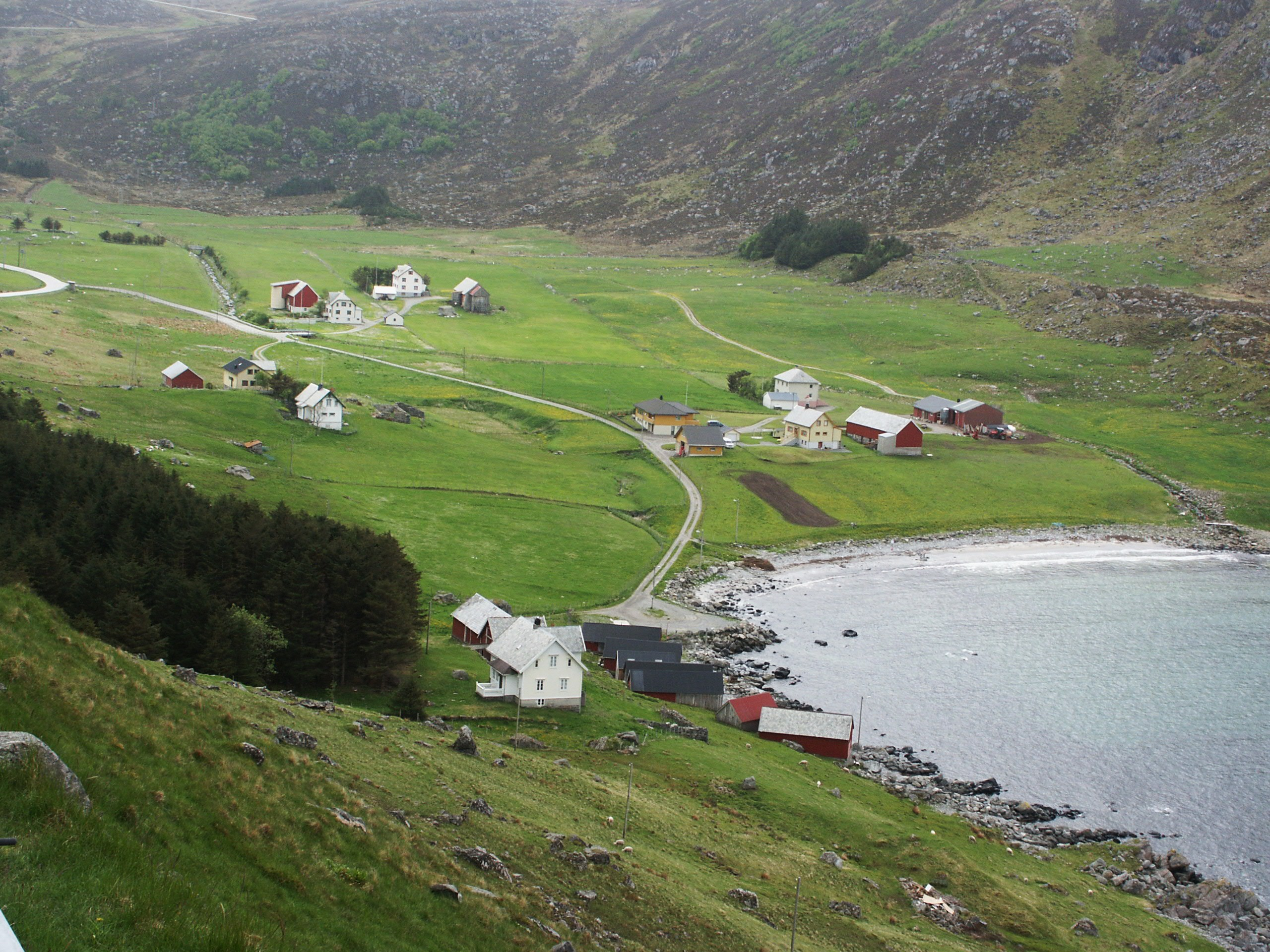
The village of Årvik on the Stad peninsula

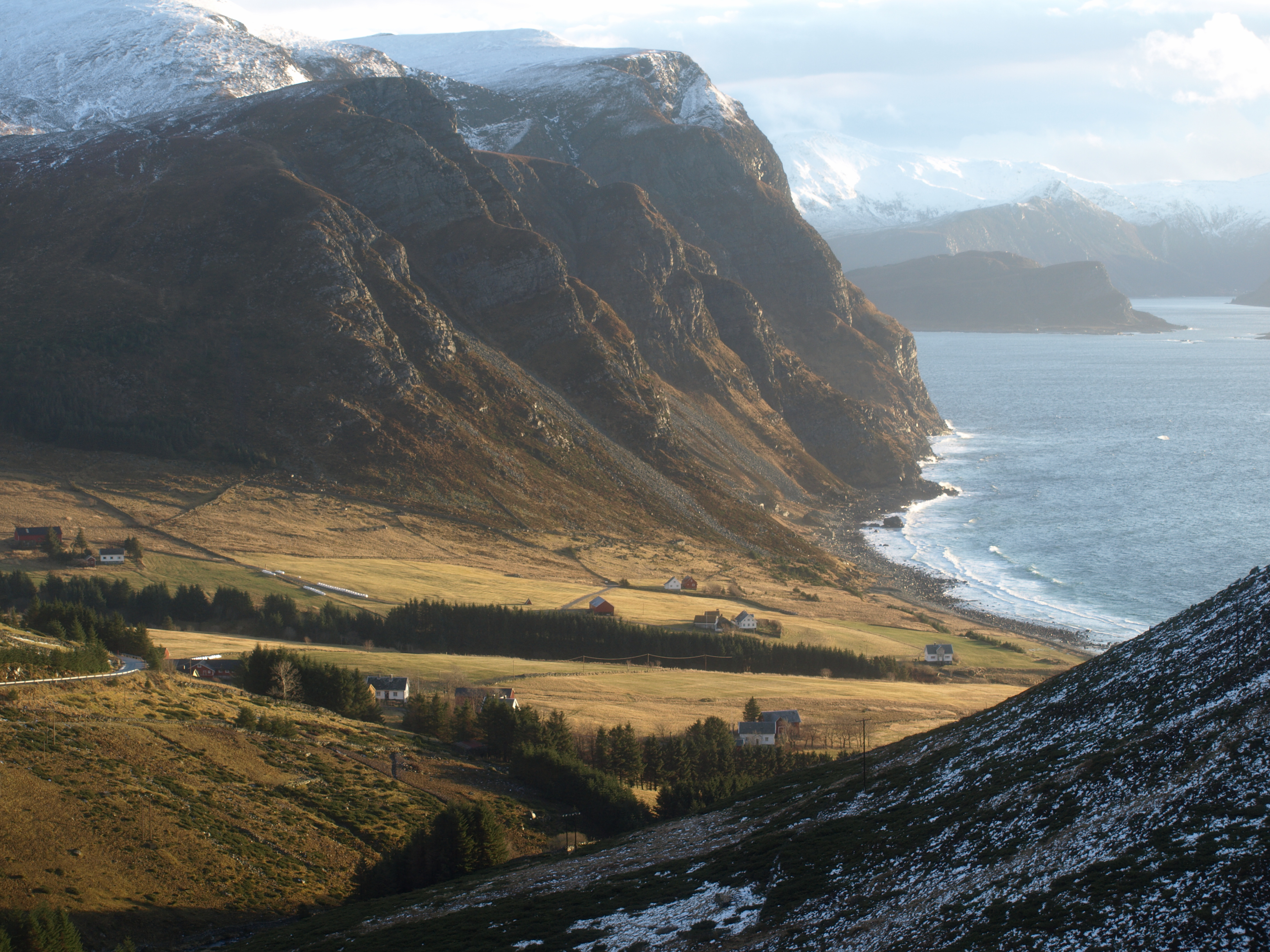
The village of Drage on the Stad peninsula

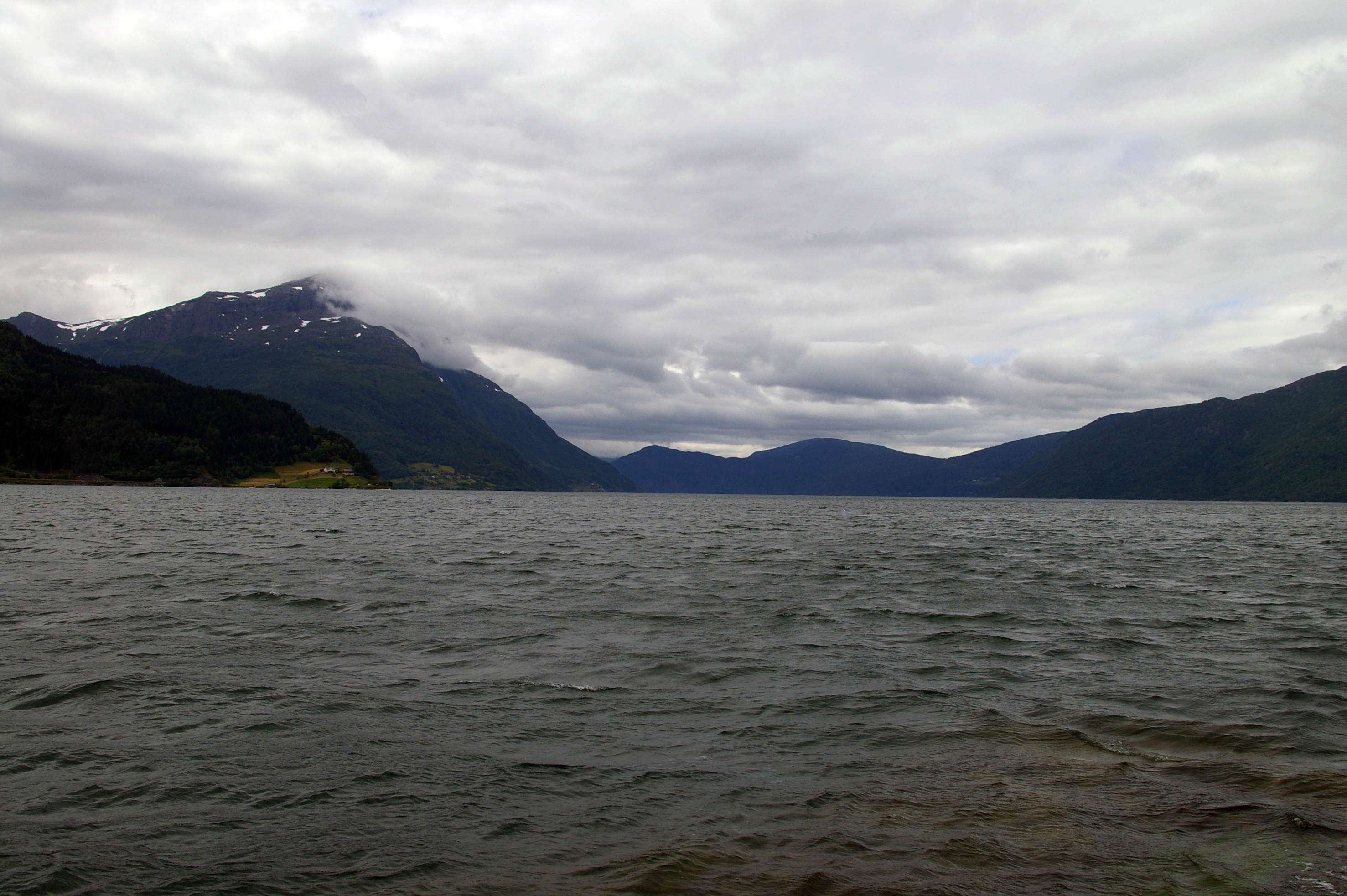
Hundvikfjord seen from Anda

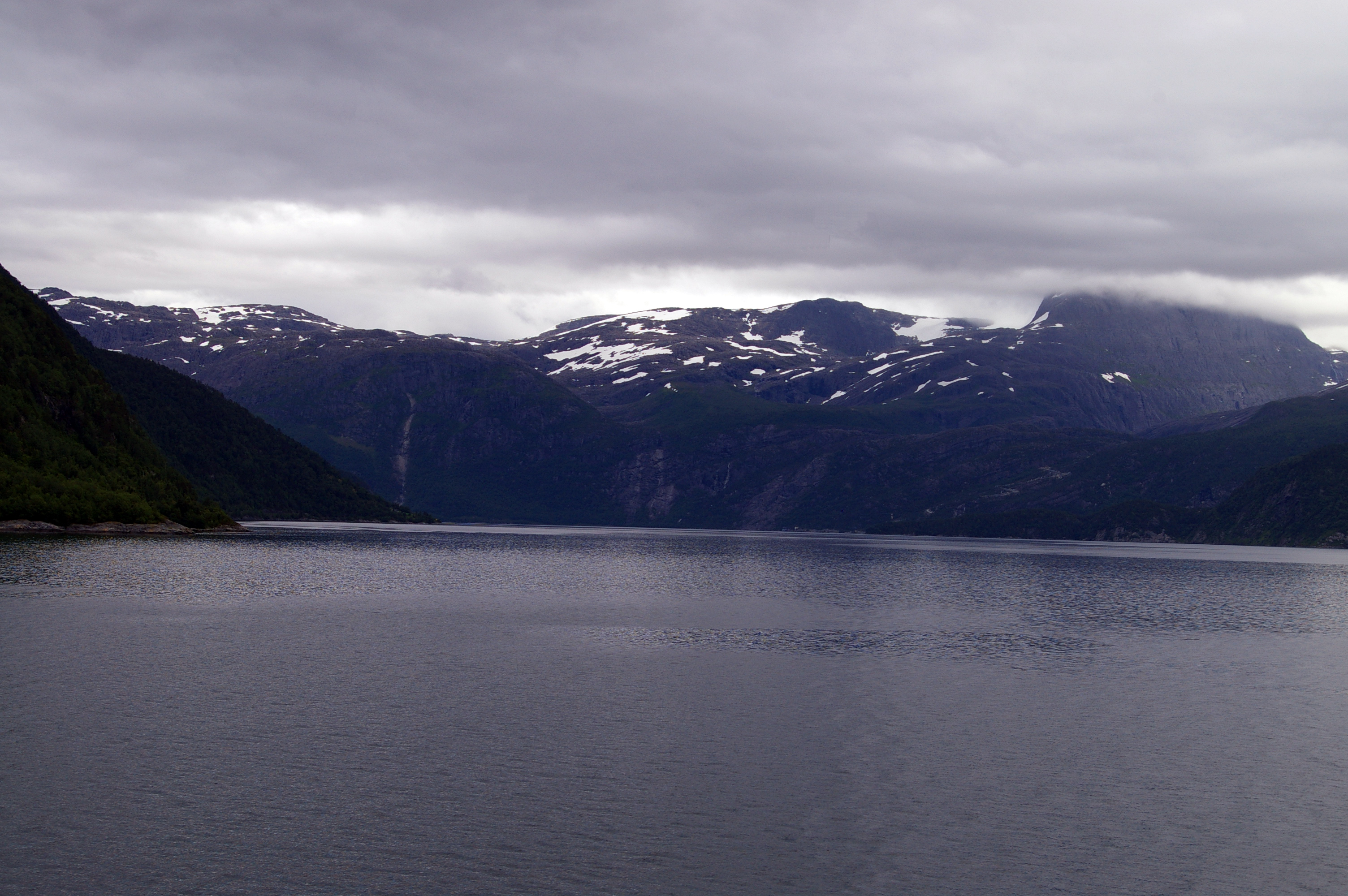
Isefjord, between Stad Municipality and Bremanger Municipality

Stad Municipality is located in the northwesternmost part of Vestland county, in the Nordfjord region. It includes the Stadlandet peninsula and the islands of Barmøya, Venøya, and Selja. The Sildagapet bay, the North Sea, and the Vanylvsfjorden lie on the western sides of the municipality. The Nordfjorden runs along the south side of the municipality. Hornindalsvatnet, the deepest lake in Europe, is partially located in the western part of the municipality. The highest point in the municipality is the 1,297.17-metre (4,255.8 ft) tall mountain Glitregga, on the border with Stryn Municipality.

Stad Municipality is bordered to the southwest by Kinn Municipality, to the north by Vanylven Municipality, Sande Municipality, and Volda Municipality (in Møre og Romsdal county). Bremanger Municipality and Gloppen Municipality lie to the south, across the fjord. Stryn Municipality lies to the east.

== Government ==
Stad Municipality is responsible for primary education (through 10th grade), outpatient health services, senior citizen services, welfare and other social services, zoning, economic development, and municipal roads and utilities. The municipality is governed by a municipal council of directly elected representatives. The mayor is indirectly elected by a vote of the municipal council. The municipality is under the jurisdiction of the Sogn og Fjordane District Court and the Gulating Court of Appeal.

=== Municipal council ===
The municipal council (Kommunestyre) of Stad Municipality is made up of 31 representatives that are elected to four-year terms. The tables below show the current and historical composition of the council by political party.

Stad kommunestyre 2023–2027
| Party name (in Nynorsk) | Number of representatives |
|---|---|
| Labour Party (Arbeidarpartiet) | 5 |
| Progress Party (Framstegspartiet) | 4 |
| Green Party (Miljøpartiet Dei Grøne) | 1 |
| Conservative Party (Høgre) | 3 |
| Industry and Business Party (Industri‑ og Næringspartiet) | 2 |
| Christian Democratic Party (Kristeleg Folkeparti) | 2 |
| Centre Party (Senterpartiet) | 10 |
| Socialist Left Party (Sosialistisk Venstreparti) | 1 |
| Liberal Party (Venstre) | 3 |
| Total number of members: | 31 |

Stad kommunestyre 2020–2023
| Party name (in Nynorsk) | Number of representatives |
|---|---|
| Labour Party (Arbeidarpartiet) | 4 |
| Progress Party (Framstegspartiet) | 3 |
| Conservative Party (Høgre) | 2 |
| Christian Democratic Party (Kristeleg Folkeparti) | 2 |
| Centre Party (Senterpartiet) | 9 |
| Socialist Left Party (Sosialistisk Venstreparti) | 2 |
| Liberal Party (Venstre) | 11 |
| Total number of members: | 33 |

=== Mayors ===
The mayor (Nynorsk: ordførar) of Stad Municipality is the political leader of the municipality and the chairperson of the municipal council. Here is a list of people who have held this position:

- 2020–2021: Alfred Bjørlo (V)
- 2021–2023: Gunnar Silden (V)
- 2023–2025: Sigurd Reksnes (Sp)

== Notable people ==
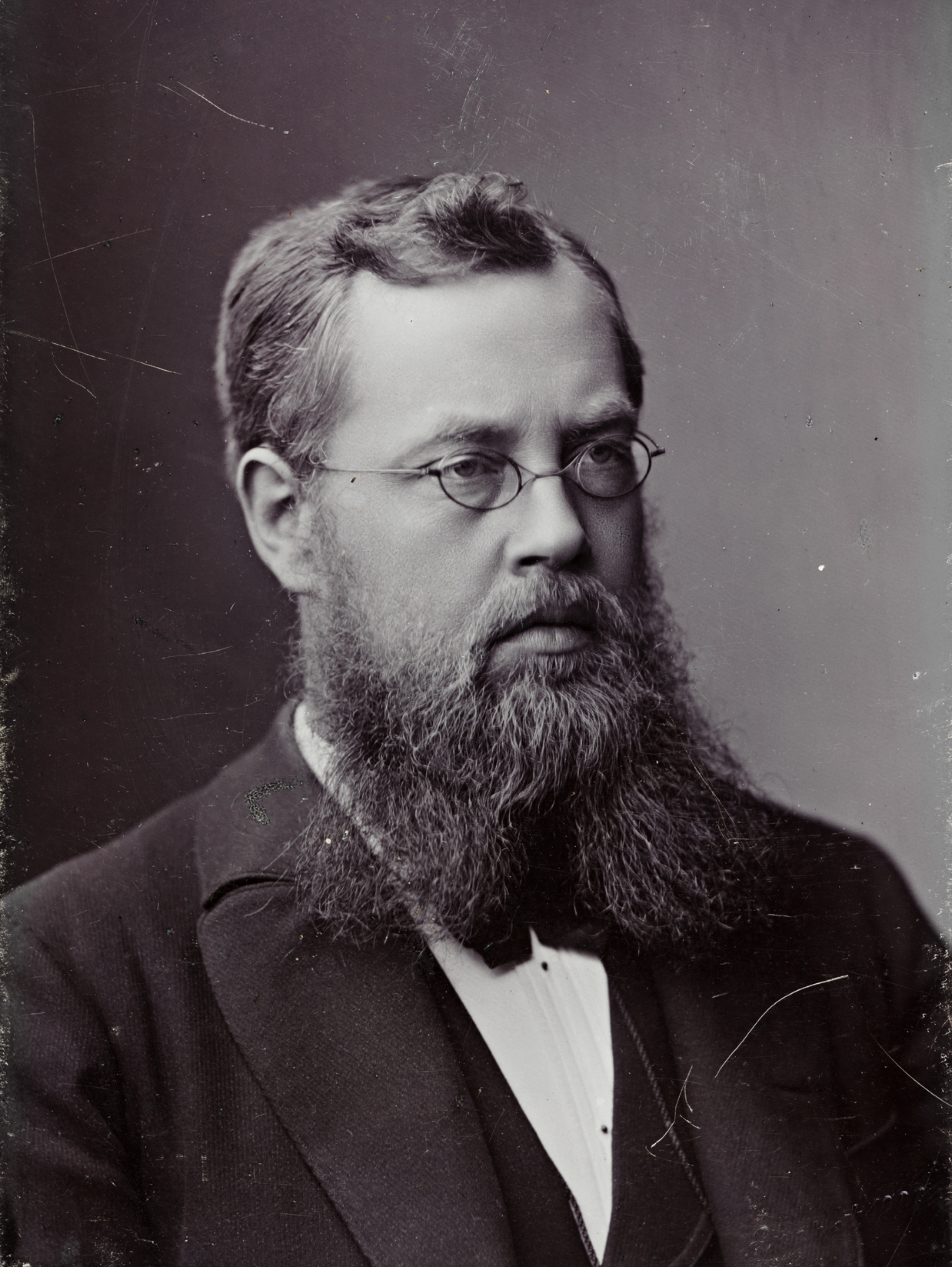
Sophus Lie, 1896

- Sophus Lie (1842 in Nordfjordeid – 1899), a mathematician
- Olav L. Os (1882 in Nordfjordeid – 1953), a politician and silver fox breeder
- Oliver H. Langeland (1887 in Nordfjordeid – 1958), a military officer, civil servant, and leader of Milorg District 13 in WWII
- Kolbjørn Varmann (1904 in Nordfjordeid – 1980), a priest, politician, Minister of Transport, and County Governor of Finnmark
- Sølve Skagen (born 1945 in Nordfjordeid), a film director
- Åge Starheim (born 1946 in Nordfjordeid), a Norwegian politician and mayor of Selje from 1983 to 1989
- Harald Aabrekk (born 1956 in Nordfjordeid), a football coach and a former player
- Brynjar Rasmussen (born 1977 in Nordfjordeid), a jazz musician who plays the clarinet
- Azar Karadas (born 1981 in Nordfjordeid), a former footballer with over 400 club caps and 10 for Norway
- Ingrid Thunem (born 1989 in Nordfjordeid), a paralympic swimmer
- Alfred Bjørlo (born 1972 in Nordfjordeid) is a politician
- Sveinung Rotevatn (born 1987 in Nordfjordeid) served as Minister of Climate and the Environment and other national positions.
- Anne Lille (born 2004 in Nordfjordeid) singer.
