= Selje (village) =

Village in Stad Municipality, Norway

- Village
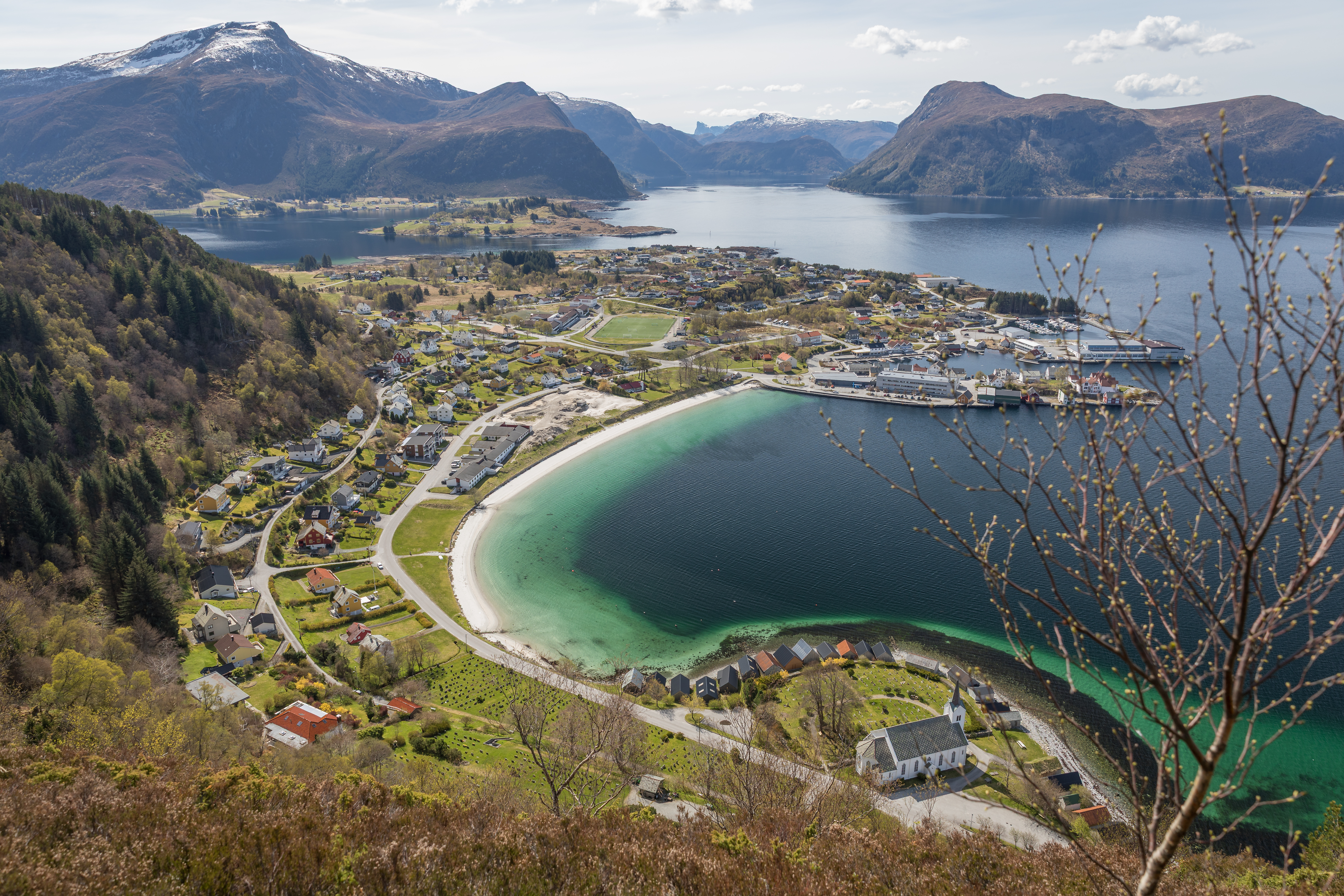
- View of Selje
- Interactive map of Selje
- Location within Vestland Location within Norway
- Coordinates: 62.0444°N 5.3474°E
- Country: Norway
- Region: Western Norway
- County: Vestland
- District: Nordfjord
- Municipality: Stad Municipality

Area
  - Total: 0.71 km^{2} (0.27 sq mi)
- Elevation: 10 m (33 ft)

Population (2024)
  - Total: 718
  - Density: 1,011/km^{2} (2,620/sq mi)
- Time zone: UTC+01:00 (CET)
  - Summer (DST): UTC+02:00 (CEST)
- Post Code: 6740 Selje

Selje is a village in Stad Municipality in Vestland county, Norway. The village is located at the southwestern base of the Stadlandet peninsula at the entrance to the Moldefjorden. The village lies about 17 kilometres (11 mi) northeast of the town of Måløy and about 65 kilometres (40 mi) southwest of the town of Ålesund. The small island of Selja lies just off the coast of the village. Selje Church is located in the village.

The 0.71-square-kilometre (180-acre) village has a population (2024) of 718 and a population density of 1,011 inhabitants per square kilometre (2,620/sq mi).

== History ==
The village was the administrative centre of the old Selje Municipality until 2020 when it was merged into Stad Municipality.
