= SS Barøy (1929) =

Norwegian steamship

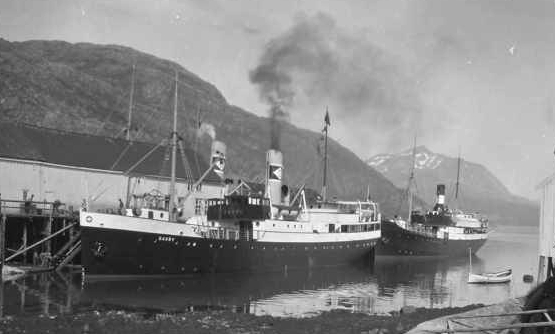
- Barøy (front) in Lødingen, 1930

History

Norway
- Name: Barøy
- Owner: Ofotens Dampskibsselskab
- Port of registry: Narvik
- Route: Narvik–Lødingen–Svolvær (1929–1940); Hurtigruten (1940–1941)
- Builder: Trondhjems mekaniske Værksted
- Yard number: 195
- Completed: 19 August 1929
- Identification: Code letters: LJHW
- Fate: Sunk by British aircraft 13 September 1941

General characteristics
- Type: Passenger/cargo ship
- Tonnage: 424 GRT
- Length: 143 ft (43.59 m)
- Beam: 7.3 ft (2.23 m)
- Propulsion: 450 hp triple expansion steam engine
- Speed: 11 knots (20 km/h) at ordinary speed
- Capacity: 200 passengers
- Crew: 26

SS Barøy was a 424-ton steel-hulled steamship delivered from the Trondhjems mekaniske Værksted shipyard in Trondheim in 1929. She had been ordered by the Norwegian shipping company Ofotens Dampskibsselskab for the local route from the port city of Narvik to the smaller towns of Lødingen and Svolvær. After the company suffered ship losses in the 1940 Norwegian Campaign Barøy was put into Hurtigruten service on the Trondheim–Narvik route. She was sunk with heavy loss of life in a British air attack in the early hours of 13 September 1941.

== Building and commissioning ==
Barøy was delivered by Trondhjems mekaniske Værksted to Ofotens Dampskibsselskab on 19 August 1929. She was a typical North-Norwegian local transport, with an open weather deck and configured with two cargo holds, a First Class passenger section in the aft and a Third Class area in the bow. The First Class accommodation included 45 bunks, and the ship was certified to carry a total of 200 passengers.

== Pre-war years ==
Most of Barøy's pre-war service was on the Narvik–Lødingen–Svolvær route for which she had been built, although she also acted as a reserve vessel for the Narvik–Trondheim express route.

== Second World War ==
The outbreak of the Second World War led to Norwegian government restrictions on the Hurtigruten from 1 October 1939 onwards, with a reduction in both sailing speed and the number of departures from Bergen, which was cut from seven to five a week. The restrictions followed a massive increase in shipping along the Norwegian coast in the autumn of 1939 as supplies were transported to ports all along the Norwegian coast in preparation for war. After massive protests from the coastal population daily departures were reintroduced on 5 December 1939.

In April 1940 many Hurtigruten ships were being refurbished before the summer season and reserve vessels were sailing the route. One of the reserve ships on the Hurtigruten service was Barøy, standing in for the 873-ton SS Nordnorge, which was undergoing maintenance work at Trondhjems mekaniske Værksted. Barøy had departed Bergen on 2 April, arrived at Trondheim on 4 April and was docked at Hammerfest in the northern county of Finnmark on 9 April 1940.

=== German occupation ===
After surviving the German invasion on 9 April and the 62-day-long Norwegian Campaign that followed it, Barøy was set to assist in the transportation of released German prisoners of war from the Norwegian prisoner of war camp on the island of Skorpa in Kvænangen Municipality in Troms county. Barøy carried out the mission together with Finnmark Fylkesrederi's steamer Tanahorn, the latter carrying some 200 Germans to Tromsø and Barøy taking the remaining 260 to the same port city. Barøy continued serving in Nordnorge's place during the German occupation of Norway, Nordnorge having been sunk by Royal Navy warships during the Norwegian Campaign after she had been pressed into service as a covert troopship by the invading German forces. Barøy was considered too small a vessel for the longer distances, such as the Hurtigruten route between Bergen and Narvik, and her prolonged service on the route was an emergency measure.

==== Last voyage and sinking ====
A year and a half after the German invasion Barøy was still sailing the Hurtigruten route as the fifth weekly northbound departure from Trondheim to Narvik. In the early hours of 13 September 1941 she was on her way northwards, and had recently called at Skutvik on her way to Tranøy in Hamarøy Municipality. On board the ship was a crew of 26, as well as 105 passengers, 37 of whom were German soldiers. The German troops on board were members of the 197th Infantry Division.

At 03:50 on 13 September Barøy was struck by a torpedo some 2 nautical miles (3.7 km) west of Tranøy Lighthouse, sinking within minutes. The torpedo ripped open the ship's hull, quickly flooding her with water, and immediately knocking out the electrical power on board. Due to the ship sinking so rapidly there was no time to lower the lifeboats, and the people on board had to jump into the water in order to survive. At the time of the sinking the water temperature was 7–8 °C (45–46 °F). The torpedo that sank Barøy had been dropped by an 817 Squadron Fairey Albacore, one of seven that attacked shipping in the Vestfjorden area that morning. The Albacore crews also claimed to have sunk another vessel, of around 2,000 tons, in the same attack. The Fleet Air Arm aircraft came from the fleet carrier HMS Victorious, which was part of Force M which had escorted the old carrier HMS Argus, carrying 24 Hawker Hurricane fighters to the Soviet Union. On their way back to the UK the Albacores on board Victorious were assigned anti-shipping and bombing missions on the Norwegian coast and 12 aircraft took off at 03:00 and flew east, navigating by moonlight. Seven of the Albacores belonged to 817 Squadron and carried torpedoes, the remaining five were 832 Squadron aircraft with bombs. While the 817 Squadron aircraft sank Barøy, the 832 Squadron bombed the hydroelectric power station in Glomfjord, the aluminium plant Nordag in Haugvik and the radio station at Røst. Two Norwegian civilians died at Glomfjord and one at Røst. No British aircraft were lost during the operation. At the time of the attack Barøy had been sailing with full lighting due to work being carried out on the deck cargo. The wreck of the ship rests at depth of around 300 metres (980 ft).

The first ship to discover the sinking of Barøy was the 762-ton Norwegian cargo ship SS Skjerstad, which passed the scene of the sinking on her way southwards and rescued 19 survivors, as well as recovering 15 bodies. The survivors of the sinking were set ashore at Svolvær. Seventy-seven Norwegians died in the attack, including seven children and 21 women. Fifty-nine of the 68 Norwegian passengers were lost, while 18 of the 26 crew members died. Of the 37 German soldiers only two survived.

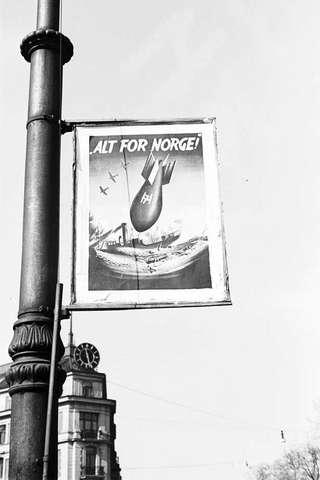
1942 Nazi propaganda poster attempting to link the exiled Norwegian King Haakon VII to the sinking of civilian Norwegian ships

=== Reactions to the attack ===
One of the consequences of the sinking of Barøy, together with the sinking of fellow Hurtigruten ship SS Richard With off Rolvsøy in Finnmark later the same day, was that the Hurtigruten ships would no longer sail further north than Tromsø. Between Tromsø and Hammerfest the route was taken over by smaller replacement ships.

The Nazi regime in Norway used the attack on Barøy, together with other attacks on civilian Norwegian shipping, in propaganda against the Allies. On 20 May 1944 the Nazi-controlled Norwegian Postal Service issued a series of postage stamps commemorating three of the most infamous cases of Norwegian ships sunk by Allied attacks. Barøy was the subject of the 10 øre stamp, while SS Sanct Svithun and SS Irma were depicted on the 15 øre and 20 øre stamps respectively. The shipwreck stamps were designed by German-born Norwegian Nazi propaganda artist and war reporter Harald Damsleth.

== Bibliography ==
- Bakka, Dag Jr. (1993). Skipene som bandt kysten sammen – Hurtigruten gjennom 100 år (in Norwegian). Bergen: Rhema Forlag.
- Engdal, Odd G. (2006). Norsk marinehistorisk atlas 900–2005 (in Norwegian). Bergen: Vigmostad & Bjørke AS. ISBN 82-419-0454-1.
- Friberg, Leif A. (1991). De grå skipene og de gule bussene (in Norwegian). Finnmark Fylkesrederi og Ruteselskap. ISBN 82-992395-0-8.
- Hafsten, Bjørn; Larsstuvold, Ulf; Olsen, Bjørn; Stenersen, Sten (2005). Flyalarm – luftkrigen over Norge 1939–1945 (in Norwegian) (2nd, revised ed.). Oslo: Sem og Stenersen AS. ISBN 82-7046-074-5.
- Voksø, Per (1994). Krigens Dagbok – Norge 1940–1945 (in Norwegian). Oslo: Forlaget Det Beste. ISBN 82-7010-245-8.
