= Ervik =

Ervik may refer to:

== Places ==
- Ervik, Bergen, a village in the Åsane borough of the city of Bergen in Norway
- Ervik, Vestland, a village in Stad municipality, Vestland county, Norway
- Ervik Church, a church in the village of Ervik in Stad municipality, Vestland county, Norway
- Ervik, Trøndelag, a village in Ørland municipality, Trøndelag county, Norway

== People ==
- Danny Ervik (born 1989), a Swedish footballer who plays for Falkenbergs FF as a defender
- Eskil Ervik (born 1975), a Norwegian speedskater
- May Helen Hetland Ervik (born 1970), Norwegian politician
