= Leikanger =

Leikanger may refer to:

- Hermansverk, commonly called Leikanger, a village and administrative centre of Sogndal Municipality in Vestland county, Norway
- Leikanger Municipality, a former municipality in the old Sogn og Fjordane county, Norway
- Leikanger, Selje, a village in Stad Municipality in Vestland county, Norway
- Leikanger Church, a church in Sogndal Municipality in Vestland county, Norway
- Leikanger Church (Herøy), a church in Herøy Municipality in Møre og Romsdal county, Norway
- Leikanger Church (Selje), a church in Stad Municipality in Vestland county, Norway
