= Ludvig Johan Bakkevig =

Norwegian engineer and Christian leader

Ludvig Johan Bakkevig (11 October 1921 – 21 April 2013) was a Norwegian engineer and Christian leader.

He was born in Haugesund, and graduated from the Norwegian Institute of Technology in 1947. He was an engineer by profession, working for Oslo Lysverker from 1947 to 1949 and Thor Furuholmen until 1974. He was the chief executive of Ringsakerhus from 1974 to 1977 and director of the building division in Norconsult from 1977 to 1980. From 1980 to 1987 he was the chief executive and chair of Alwatech. His specialty was tunnelling, as a co-founder of the Norwegian Tunneling Society and active in the International Tunnelling Association. He has also worked on hydroelectricity projects in Jordan and Nepal.

He was also manager in the Norwegian Missionary Society in the 1970s. In religious circles he is best known as leader of the Church of Norway National Council from 1978 to 1986. He resided at Billingstad. He died in April 2013.

Religious titles
Preceded by Per Voksø	Leader of the Church of Norway National Council; 1978–1986	Succeeded by Finn Olav Myhre
