= Tranøy Lighthouse =

Coastal lighthouse in Hamarøy, Norway

Tranøy Lighthouse Tranøy fyrstasjon
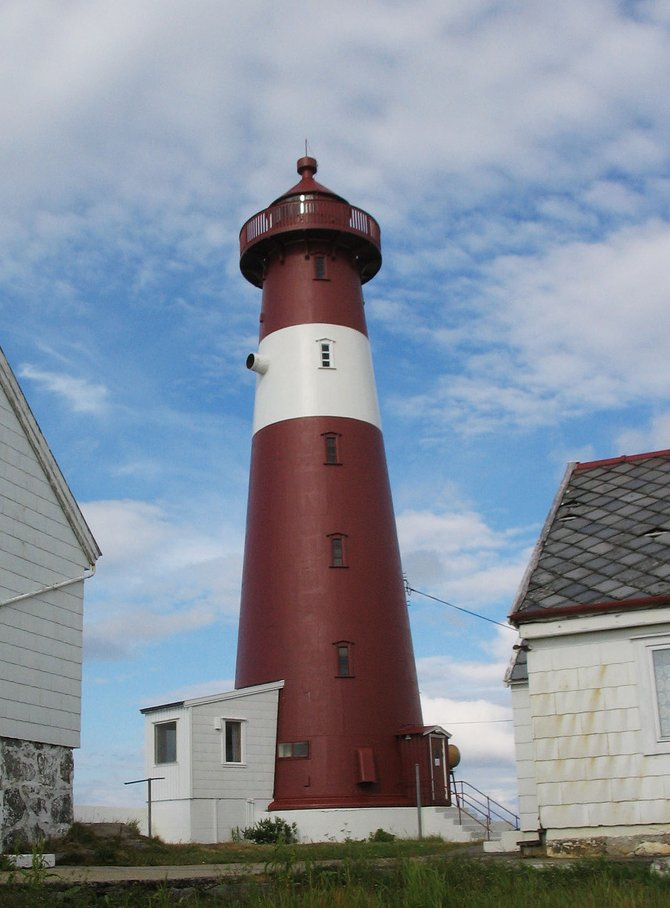
- View of the lighthouse
- Location of the lighthouse
- Location: Nordland, Norway
- Coordinates: 68°11′N 15°37′E

Tower
- Constructed: 1864
- Construction: cast iron
- Automated: 1991
- Height: 27.3 metres (90 ft)
- Shape: cylindrical
- Markings: red with one white stripe
- Heritage: cultural heritage preservation in Norway

Light
- First lit: 1914
- Focal height: 28 metres (92 ft)
- Intensity: 57,300 candela
- Range: Red: 9.82 nmi (18.19 km; 11.30 mi) Green: 9.36 nmi (17.33 km; 10.77 mi) White: 12.39 nmi (22.95 km; 14.26 mi)
- Characteristic: Oc(3) WRG 10s
- Norway no.: 719500

Tranøy Lighthouse (Norwegian: Tranøy fyr) is a coastal lighthouse in Hamarøy Municipality in Nordland county, Norway. It is located along the Vestfjorden, about 2.5 kilometres (1.6 mi) west of the village of Tranøy.

== History ==
The lighthouse here was originally built in 1864 and in 1991 the light was automated. The lighthouse has a white, red, or green light (depending on direction) that is occulting three times every 10 seconds. The 27-metre (89 ft) round cast iron tower is painted red with one white horizontal band. The site includes a complete and well-preserved light station, including a 1 1/2-story duplex keeper's house, generator house, boathouse, and farm buildings.

The present lighthouse was built in 1914 as the Moholmen Lighthouse in Vågan Municipality, but it was relocated here in 1936 and Moholmen was replaced by a shorter tower. Beginning in 1993, the Tranøy lighthouse station has been developed as a tourist attraction. The site has views across the Vestfjorden to the high mountains of the Lofoten islands. Tranøy Lighthouse is accessible by road, with a footbridge that leads to the lighthouse.

== See also ==
- Lighthouses in Norway
- List of lighthouses in Norway
