= SS Irma =

Several steamships have borne the name Irma:

- SS Irma (1888) was a 1,763-ton cargo ship launched as Despina G. Michalinos on 19 November 1888, by Irvine, Scotland. Renamed Irma in 1903. Wrecked off Cape Verde, on 21 April 1910.
- SS Irma (1889) was a 535-ton cargo ship launched as James Speir on 7 December 1889, by Robert Craggs in Stockton-on-Tees, England. Renamed Irma in 1907. Renamed two more times before being shipwrecked off Blyth, England, on 16 February 1923.
- SS Irma (1890) was a 336-ton cargo ship completed in September 1890, by Göteborgs Mekaniska Verkstad in Gothenburg, Sweden. Renamed Schwinge in 1920. Scrapped in Hamburg in 1937.
- SS Irma (1905) was a 1,322-ton passenger/cargo ship launched on 5 January 1905, by Sir Raylton Dixon & Co. Ltd. in Middlesbrough, England. Torpedoed and sunk by motor torpedo boats in Hustadvika, Norway, on 13 February 1944.
- SS Irma (Brake, 1906) was a 150-ton cargo ship completed in 1906, by Thyen in Brake, Germany. Renamed four times.
- SS Irma (North Sands, 1906) was a 3,655-ton cargo ship launched as Don Cesar on 27 April 1906, by Thompson, J.L. in North Sands, England. Renamed Irma in 1941, shipwrecked off Trondheim, Norway on 14 March 1944.
- SS Irma (1908) was a 321-ton cargo ship launched in the third quarter of 1908 as Tillydrine, by Dundee Ship Building Company in Dundee, Scotland. Renamed Irma in 1938. Shelled and sunk off Zuara, Italian Libya by the British destroyers HMS Kelvin and HMS Jaguar on 20 January 1941.
- SS Irma (1911) was an 844-ton cargo ship completed in December 1911, by Loire in Nantes, France. Torpedoed and sunk off Wolf Rock, England by the German U-boat SMS UB-38 on 30 September 1916.
- SS Irma (1913) was a 1,193-ton cargo ship completed in March 1913, by Nuscke in Stettin-Grabow, Germany. Renamed five times, and sank off Marjaniemi, Finland on 26 October 1936.
