= SS Sanct Svithun =

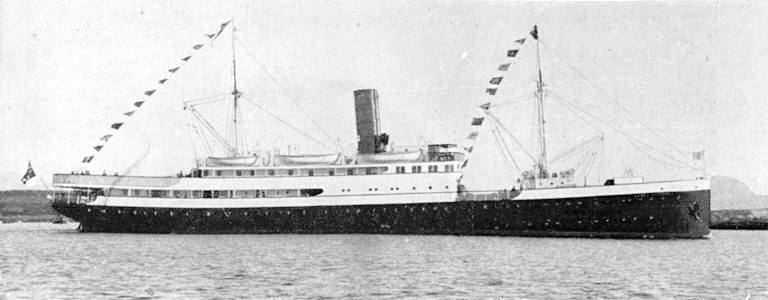

History

Norway
- Name: Sanct Svithun
- Namesake: Saint Swithun – patron saint of Stavanger, Norway
- Owner: Det Stavangerske Dampskibsselskab in Stavanger
- Port of registry: Stavanger
- Route: Hurtigruten
- Builder: Danziger Werft, Free City of Danzig
- Yard number: 46
- Launched: March 1927
- Acquired: 1 July 1927
- Home port: Bergen, Norway
- Fate: Sunk by Allied aircraft on 30 September 1943

General characteristics
- Tonnage: 1,376 GRT
- Length: 236 ft (71.93 m)
- Beam: 35.2 ft (10.73 m)
- Draught: 21.3 ft (6.49 m)
- Propulsion: 1,650 hp 4 cylinder Lentz-type double compound engine
- Speed: 14 knots (26 km/h)
- Capacity: 100 First Class, 82 Third Class
- Armament: After 1940: German-manned anti-aircraft guns

SS Sanct Svithun was a 1,376 ton steel-hulled steamship built by the German shipyard Danziger Werft and delivered to the Norwegian Stavanger-based shipping company Det Stavangerske Dampskibsselskab on 1 July 1927. She sailed the Hurtigruten route along the coast of Norway until she was lost in an air attack on 30 September 1943 during the Second World War.

== Construction ==
Sanct Svithun was built for the Norwegian shipping company Det Stavangerske Dampskibsselskab by Danziger Werft in the Free City of Danzig in 1927, with yard number 46. She was launched in March, and delivered on 1 July 1927. She was rated at 1,376 gross register tons, measured 236 ft (71.93 m) in length, had a beam of 35.2 ft (10.73 m) and a draught of 21.3 ft (6.49 m). Her 1,650 hp 4 cylinder Lentz-type double compound engine could propel the ship at 14 knots (26 km/h). She was certified to take 100 First Class and 82 Third Class passengers. Sanct Svithun was named after Saint Swithun – the patron saint of Stavanger.

== Pre-Second World War ==
After her delivery from the Free City of Danzig Sanct Svithun was employed on the passenger/freight line between Bergen in Western Norway and various ports in Northern Norway. In 1931 she was rebuilt with a refrigerated cargo hold to enable her to transport fresh fish from the fisheries in Northern Norway. During the rebuild she was also fitted with wireless telegraphy. She was a popular ship amongst her passengers, with a large superstructure and a spacious promenade deck with a look-out salon in the bow area. Sanct Svithun was also known as a superbly seaworthy vessel.

== Second World War ==
When Nazi Germany invaded Norway on 9 April 1940 Sanct Svithun was at the Klaseskjær shipyard in Stavanger for her annual maintenance work. By the summer of 1940 she was back in regular service along the coast of occupied Norway.

=== Sinking ===
On Thursday 30 September 1943 Sanct Svithun was on her way southwards off the Stad peninsula in Western Norway, from Ålesund to Måløy. As was the case with all Norwegian ships operating in German-occupied Norway she had her name and NORGE (English: NORWAY) painted on both her sides. Large Norwegian flags were also painted both on her sides and on her roof. Her complement of passengers consisted of both Norwegian civilians and German military personnel. Although a civilian ship on a regular cargo and passenger route she had German anti-aircraft artillery on board and these guns were always manned by German soldiers.

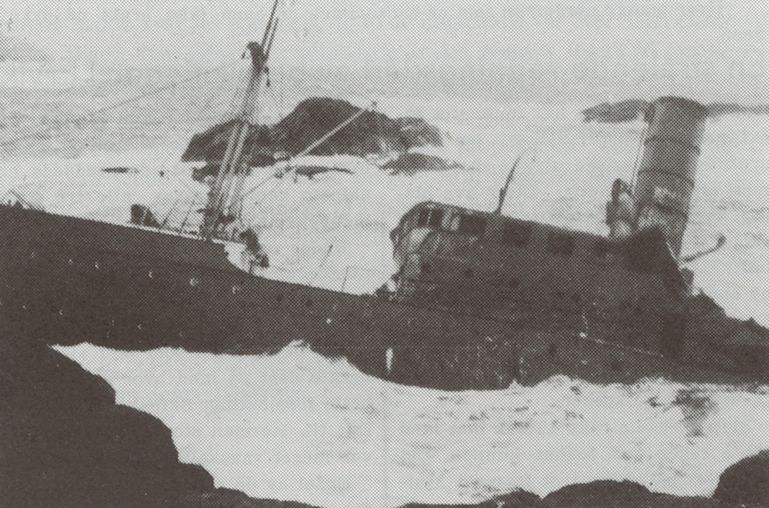
Sanct Svithun beached after the attack

At 19:00, when Sanct Svithun was in a position between the islets of Vossa and Buholmen, she was attacked by six Bristol Beaufighters from the Canadian 404 Squadron armed with "60 lb" 3-inch rockets. Sanct Svithun was sailing alone without escort, and her anti-aircraft armament was ineffective, allowing the Beaufighters to press through their attack with great precision. The attack, which included machine gun and 20 mm auto-cannon fire, left the Norwegian steamer burning in strong gale-force weather. Many people jumped into the ocean to escape the flames, soon perishing in the stormy seas before the pilot managed to beach the ship between Buholmen islet and a rocky outcrop on land. Sanct Svithun lay burning on the islet for hours while the burning stern was sinking beneath the waves. During the evening and night many of the people on board managed to make their way ashore, greatly aided by local people from the nearby village of Ervik, twenty of whom went to sea in half a dozen rowing boats to try and rescue the survivors. Between 41 and 46 Norwegians died in the incident, while 75 or 76 were saved; only two of the Germans on board survived. Many people were able to make their way ashore after sailor Olav Iversen Kvalvågnes managed to swim to land with a rope. The captain, Samuel Alshager, was the last to abandon ship. Two to three days after the attack Sanct Svithun slipped off the islet and sank in deeper waters. Today most of the wreck has been broken up by the weather. The remains are located off Buholmen at a depth of between five and thirty metres.

=== Reactions to the sinking of SS Sanct Svithun ===
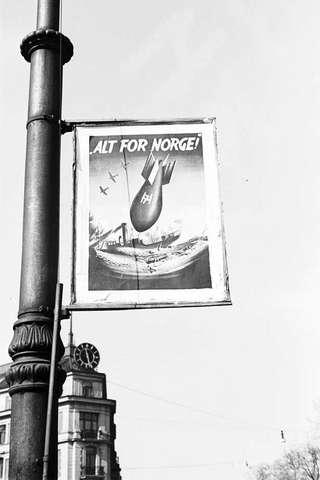
1942 Nazi propaganda poster attempting to link the exiled Norwegian King Haakon VII to the sinking of civilian Norwegian ships

The Allied sinking of Sanct Svithun – an unescorted Norwegian passenger ship – led to strong reactions in Norway, with the leadership of the Norwegian resistance movement sending a letter of protest to the press office of the Norwegian government in exile in London on 20 October 1943. In the letter the resistance stated that "We have received message from a trusted source in Western Norway who has been gathering reliable intelligence from eye witnesses and survivors about the sinking of Sanct Svithun. He declares that the German reports in the media are by and large correct. When the negative impacts have not been greater, the reason is that everyone back home refuse to believe that the Allies could have behaved in such a manner. This is in conflict with the experiences that people back home have made over almost three years. If anything like this was to happen again, it would be highly damaging." (Note: Norwegian: Vi har mottatt meddelelse fra en pålitelig rapportør på Vestlandet som har innsamlet pålitelig underretning blant øyenvitner og overlevende angående "St. Svithun"s senkning. Han erklærer at de tyske beretninger i pressen stort sett er riktige. Når de uheldige virkninger ikke er blitt større, kommer det av at alle hjemme nekter å tro at engelskmennene kan ha oppført seg på en sådan måte. Det står i strid med de erfaringer som er blitt gjort av folk hjemme i nesten 3 år. Om sånt skulle hende igjen, ville det være i høyeste grad skadelig. Kleppa, Hermund (2000). "Minnekapellet i Ervik og "Sanct Svithun"-tragedien". Sogn og Fjordane county municipality (in Norwegian).) The letter was presented to Norwegian Minister of Foreign Affairs Trygve Lie and debated in a government conference.

The sinking was featured heavily in the Nazi-controlled Norwegian newspapers, with the Norwegian national socialist party Nasjonal Samling's official publication Fritt Folk used the incident in its anti-Allied propaganda, calling the attack "a horrifyings enemy deed".

On 20 May 1944 the Norwegian Postal Service released three postage stamps with designs commemorating war-related shipwrecks, the 15 Øre stamp featuring the sinking of SS Sanct Svithun. Each stamp cost an extra 10 Øre meant to go to the benefit of injured shipwreck survivors and the relatives of those killed. The shipwreck stamps were designed by German-born Norwegian pro-Nazi propaganda artist Harald Damsleth and the other two ships portrayed on the stamps where SS Barøy and SS Irma, sunk in 1941 and 1944 respectively.

== Post-war memorial ==
In gratitude to the villagers of Ervik's rescue efforts the shipping company, Det Stavangerske Dampskibsselskab, donated in 1970 the ship's bell from Sanct Svithun to a memorial chapel built in Ervik that year, where it has since remained. The idea to build a memorial chapel had originally been proposed by Vidkun Quisling's collaborationist Nasjonal Samling administration. Although many Norwegians opposed the chapel plans Captain Alshager of Sanct Svithun supported the building of a memorial, stating that honouring the dead of the shipwreck had to be seen separately of the war in general. Alshager had captained Sanct Svithun from 1928 until her 1943 sinking. The first foundation stone for the chapel was laid down in 1944, but the project was put aside after the end of the war. The new foundation stone for the chapel, moved a distance from the original location, was laid down in 1968. When the chapel was inaugurated in 1970 close to 1,000 people were present and the building was handed over to Selje Municipality. In addition to the ship's bell, the chapel contains a small exhibition relating to the shipwreck, and Sanct Svithun's anchor is displayed outside the building. The chapel was designed by architects Arnstein Arneberg and Olav Platou. Most of the church art and liturgical items relate to Sanct Svithun. On 1 January 1997 Ervik Chapel was re-designated as a church and renamed Ervik Church.

== Bibliography ==
- Bakka, Dag Jr. (1993). Skipene som bandt kysten sammen – Hurtigruten gjennom 100 år (in Norwegian). Bergen: Rhema Forlag.
- Engdal, Odd G. (2006). Norsk marinehistorisk atlas 900–2005 (in Norwegian). Bergen: Vigmostad & Bjørke AS. ISBN 82-419-0454-1.
- Hafsten, Bjørn; Ulf Larsstuvold; Bjørn Olsen; Sten Stenersen (1991). Flyalarm – luftkrigen over Norge 1939–1945 (in Norwegian) (1st ed.). Oslo: Sem og Stenersen AS. ISBN 82-7046-058-3.
- Voksø, Per (1994). Krigens Dagbok – Norge 1940–1945 (in Norwegian). Oslo: Forlaget Det Beste. ISBN 82-7010-245-8.
