= SS Irma (1905) =

Coordinates: 49°29′N 5°42′W

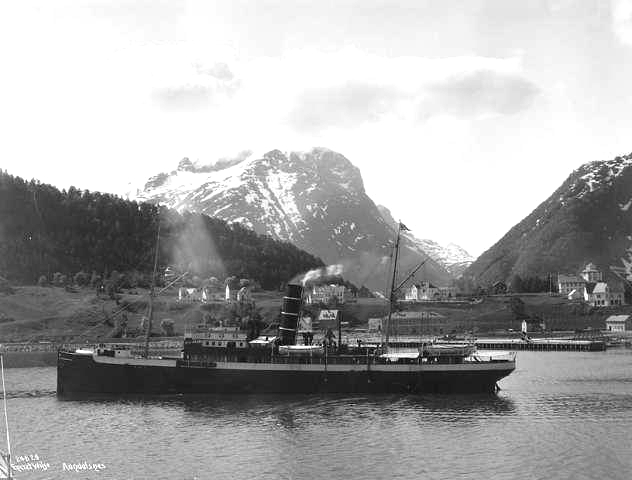

History

Norway
- Name: Irma
- Owner: Det Bergenske Dampskibsselskab
- Port of registry: Bergen
- Route: Bergen–Newcastle (1905–1921); Norway–Hamburg (1927–1931); Hurtigruten (1931–1944)
- Builder: Sir Raylton Dixon & Co. Ltd., Middlesbrough, United Kingdom of Great Britain and Ireland
- Cost: 570,684 kr
- Yard number: 510
- Launched: 5 January 1905
- Acquired: April 1905
- Out of service: 13 February 1944
- Identification: Code letters: MCHD; Code Letters: LDTP
- Fate: Sunk by Royal Norwegian Navy MTBs

General characteristics
- Type: Passenger/cargo ship (1905–1944); Troop ship (1939)
- Tonnage: 1,322 GRT
- Length: 244 ft (74.37 m)
- Beam: 32.8 ft (10.00 m)
- Draught: 21.1 ft (6.43 m)
- Propulsion: 1,500 hp triple expansion steam engine
- Speed: 13.5 knots (25.0 km/h)
- Capacity: 87 passengers (1940): 39 First Class; 48 Third Class
- Notes: All the above listed information, unless otherwise noted, was acquired from

SS Irma was a 1,322-ton steamship built by the British shipyard Sir Raylton Dixon & Co. Ltd. in Middlesbrough in the north-east of England. She was delivered to the Norwegian passenger ship company Det Bergenske Dampskibsselskab of Bergen in 1905. Irma served the company until she was attacked and sunk by two MTBs belonging to the Royal Norwegian Navy on 13 February 1944.

== Before the Second World War ==
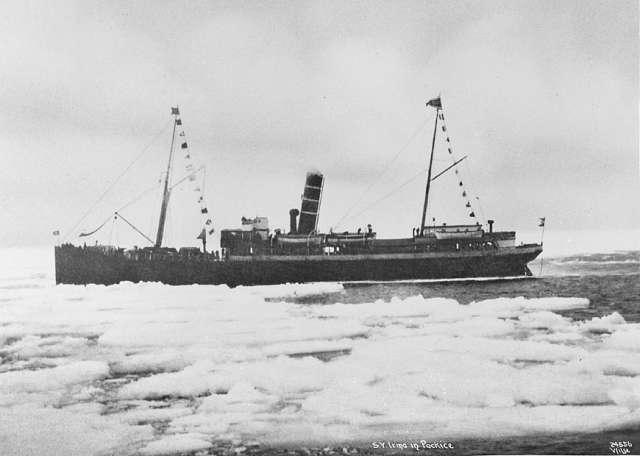
Irma in pack ice off Svalbard sometime in the 1920s

After delivery, Irma served on the Bergen–Newcastle route until she was transferred to Norway in the autumn of 1921 to provide voyages for tourists to North Cape and Spitsbergen during the summer season. In 1927, she was put on the Norway–Hamburg route, replacing SS Neptun and SS Mira. A new heating system was installed in 1913 and wireless radio in 1914. A new streamlined rudder was fitted in 1928. In 1931, she joined the Hurtigruten route in Norway, replacing SS Hera after the latter's shipwreck in March that year. Irma was rebuilt in 1931, and again in 1932. In a series of upgrades she received a refrigeration system in 1933, improved navigational equipment in 1938 and an echo sounding device in 1939. The ship was very popular with her passengers, her smoking salon receiving particular praise. She had only one serious accident in the pre-war years, which occurred when she hit a reef off Kabelvåg in the Lofoten islands in 1937. Although suffering leaks in her port side, Irma managed to make port in Kabelvåg and put ashore all of her 120 passengers. Repairs were carried out at a shipyard in Bergen.

== Second World War ==
=== Troopship duties ===
Following the outbreak of the Finnish-Soviet Winter War in late November 1939, Norway reinforced her northern border forces, and Irma was dispatched from the Nordland port of Mosjøen on 11 December 1939 to transport Norwegian troops to the border with the Soviet-occupied Finnish district of Petsamo. The troops belonged to the first battalion of Infantry Regiment 14. The original orders from the military were that the entire battalion was to board Irma for the journey to Finnmark, even though the ship was only certified to carry less than half the number of people involved. After vigorous protests from both soldiers and officers over safety concerns and overcrowding, the original plan was abandoned and only half the battalion shipped on Irma, the rest leaving some days later on the fellow Hurtigruten steamer Richard With. The incident with Norwegian conscripts being subjected to attempts to force them to board an overcrowded ship led to a public outcry in Mosjøen. The Mosjøen newspaper Helgeland Arbeiderblad published an article shortly after the incident criticising the Norwegian military leadership's handling of the troop transport.

When the German invasion of Norway began on 9 April 1940, Irma was at Bergen, one of the Norwegian cities captured by German forces that day. She continued to sail along the Norwegian coast with passengers and freight during the German occupation.

=== Last voyage ===
On 13 February 1944 Irma was sailing northwards from Bergen to Trondheim under the command of Captain Sofus Strømberg. That day she had a crew of 43 and was carrying 40 Norwegian passengers as well as probably seven Germans. Her cargo consisted of freight, mail and 1,800 tons of herring.

==== Sinking ====
At 18:37 Irma, sailing in Hustadvika Bay by Hestskjær Lighthouse off the port of Kristiansund in Møre og Romsdal, was attacked by HNoMS MTB 627 and HNoMS MTB 653. She suffered a large explosion in the bow area. The initial explosion, which caused massive damage, was followed by another amidships shortly thereafter, the ship immediately starting to sink. The Norwegian cargo ship SS Henry was in the same area, and was also sunk shortly after Irma. In addition to what turned out to be torpedo strikes, the two ships were subjected to in total 2,034 rounds of heavy machine gun fire. 61 Norwegian civilians died on Irma, and another two on Henry. Only 25 people survived the sinking of Irma, and for days afterwards dead bodies washed ashore on the Norwegian coast as far north as Namsos. Before Henry sank she had been able to launch two of her lifeboats and these first saved several of her crew before moving to the location where Irma had gone down and rescuing survivors from floating rafts. An hour after the attack the tugboat Hopplafjord passed the scene and rescued further survivors from rafts. The fishing boat Sveggøy also rescued 12 survivors from a raft.

Irma's sinking constituted the last major loss for the Hurtigruten service during the Second World War, with numerous coastal passenger ships having up to that point been lost to mines, air and submarine attacks since the April 1940 German invasion of Norway.

The wreck of Irma was discovered by a geological survey vessel on 3 November 1999 north of Averøya at a depth of 200 metres (660 ft).

== Reactions to the sinking of Irma and Henry ==
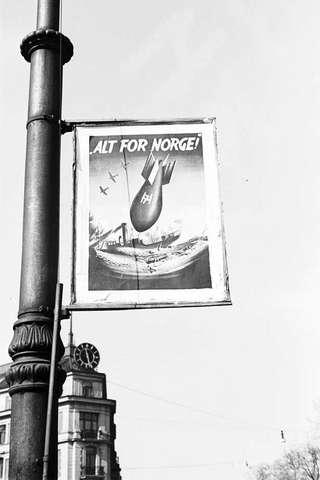
1942 Nazi propaganda poster attempting to link the exiled Norwegian King Haakon VII to the sinking of civilian Norwegian ships.

The first official response to the sinking of Irma and Henry in Norway came from the Norwegian National Socialist party Nasjonal Samling's official publication Fritt Folk on 15 February 1944. The Nazi newspaper used the word Skjendselsdåd (English: Disgraceful deed) in the headline. The next day, 16 February 1944, Fritt Folk stated that British Motor Torpedo Boats had been responsible for the attack. Only after the end of the Second World War did it become known that the ships responsible belonged to the Royal Norwegian Navy, MTB 627 sinking Irma, and MTB 653 sending Henry to the bottom. The two warships had been towed from Shetland to Hustadvika by the converted whaler HNoMS Molde, departing Shetland on 11 February 1944, and were on a mission to intercept German and German-controlled shipping.

The loss of Norwegian lives in the incident was exploited by the Nasjonal Samling propaganda machine, Thorleif Fjeldstad of the party's naval arm calling for Norwegians to join the ranks of the German Kriegsmarine.

As was also the case with the Hurtigruten ship SS Sanct Svithun, sunk the previous year, and SS Barøy sunk in 1941, Irma was depicted on one of the three postage stamps commemorating war-related shipwrecks released on 20 May 1944 by the Norwegian Postal Service. Irma was portrayed on the 20 øre stamp. The shipwreck stamps were designed by German-born Norwegian pro-Nazi propaganda artist and war reporter Harald Damsleth.

== Controversy ==
The sinking of Irma and Henry has been controversial ever since the Second World War, with disagreements over the exact nature of the events. The Royal Norwegian Navy remains adamant that Irma and Henry sailed without lights or national markings and were sailing as a convoy escorted by a German naval trawler. This has largely been disputed by the survivors of Irma and Henry. All Allied forces were under strict orders not to attack Norwegian coastal liners travelling alone on the Norwegian coast.

The MTB crews also claimed that Henry took evasive action after Irma was hit, while the survivors claimed that she had stopped to launch two of her lifeboats to assist the survivors from Irma when she herself was hit and sunk.

One explanation for the presence of the naval trawler reported by the crews of MTB 627 and MTB 653 has been suggested by several researchers. A small tugboat which happened to be in the Hustadvika area, the Hopplafjord, which rescued survivors after the sinking of the two ships, being similar to a naval trawler in size and profile, may have been misidentified as an escort vessel by the MTB commander.

== Post-war memorials ==
The sinking of Irma and Henry was officially commemorated on 16 September 2002 when King Harald V of Norway first attended a church service in Bremnes Church with bishop Odd Bondevik, and afterwards unveiled a monument at Røeggen on the island Sveggen in Averøy Municipality which listed the names of the 65 Norwegians who lost their lives in the incident. The day's events concluded with the King leading a ceremony with around 180 invited guests on board the Hurtigruten ship MS Midnatsol over the site of the shipwrecks. Two Royal Norwegian Navy Motor Torpedo Boats participated in the ceremony by lowering a floral wreath into the water.

== Literature ==
- Bakka, Dag Jr. (1993). Skipene som bandt kysten sammen – Hurtigruten gjennom 100 år (in Norwegian). Bergen: Rhema Forlag.
- Engdal, Odd G. (2006). Norsk marinehistorisk atlas 900–2005 (in Norwegian). Bergen: Vigmostad & Bjørke AS. ISBN 82-419-0454-1.
- Hegland, Jon Rustung (1989). Angrep i skjærgården – Norske motortorpedobåters operasjoner fra Shetland 1941–1945 (in Norwegian). Oslo: Dreyers Forlag A/S. ISBN 82-09-10533-7.
- Hegland, Jon Rustung; Lilleheim, Johan Henrik (1998). Norske torpedobåter gjennom 125 år – MTB våpenets 125 års jubileumsbok 1873–1998 (in Norwegian). Hundvåg: Norsk Tidsskrift for Sjøvesen. ISBN 82-994738-1-0.
- Sivertsen, Svein Carl (2001). Sjøforsvaret dag for dag 1814–2000. Hundvåg: Norsk Tidsskrift for Sjøvesen. ISBN 82-92217-03-7.
- Skogheim, Dag; Westrheim, Harry (1984). Alarm – Krigen i Nordland 1940 (in Norwegian). Oslo: Tiden Norsk Forlag. ISBN 82-10-02582-1.
- Voksø, Per (1994). Krigens Dagbok – Norge 1940–1945 (in Norwegian). Oslo: Forlaget Det Beste. ISBN 82-7010-245-8.
