= SS Barøy =

Two steamships have borne the name Barøy, after the Norwegian island Barøy:

- SS Barøy (1914) was a 302-ton passenger/cargo ship completed in June 1914, by Akers Mekaniske Verksted, Oslo, Norway. Wrecked off Andenes, Norway, on 17 February 1928.
- SS Barøy (1929) was a 424-ton passenger/cargo ship completed on 19 August 1929, by Trondhjems mekaniske Værksted in Trondheim, Norway. Torpedoed and sunk by Fleet Air Arm aircraft on 13 September 1941.
