= German submarine chaser UJ 2210 =

German warship during World War II

History

Nazi Germany
- Name: Uj-2210
- Builder: ACL/CAP, St Nazaire
- Launched: 1933
- Commissioned: November 1942
- Fate: Sunk, 28 May 1944

General characteristics
- Type: Submarine chaser
- Tonnage: 1152 GRT
- Length: 66.6 m (218 ft 6 in) o/a
- Beam: 10.5 m (34 ft 5 in)
- Draft: 5.1 m (16 ft 9 in)
- Installed power: 1,000 shp (750 kW)
- Propulsion: 1 × diesel
- Speed: 11.7 knots (21.7 km/h; 13.5 mph)

Uj-2210 was an auxiliary warship of Nazi Germany's Kriegsmarine that was in service during the Second World War. She served as a submarine chaser (U-Jäger) under Otto Pollmann, Germany's most decorated anti-submarine warfare officer. Uj-2210 was sunk in the Mediterranean in May 1944.

== Early history ==
Uj-2210 was built as the French trawler Marcella in 1933 at the ACL/CAP shipyards at St Nazaire. With a Gross Register Tonnage of 1152 tons she was an ocean-going trawler and was employed in France's deep sea fishery.

The outbreak of the Second World War and the Fall of France found Marcella in the Mediterranean, where she remained until 1942.

== Service history ==
In November 1942 Germany invaded Vichy France, and Marcella was seized by the Kriegsmarine for conversion as an anti-submarine naval trawler. On completion she was commissioned by Lt. Otto Pollmann and in the 15 months under his command, claimed 14 Allied submarines destroyed, although only one of these, (HMS Tigris) can be substantiated. Pollmann was awarded the Knight's Cross of the Iron Cross for his efforts.

Pollmann and Uj-2210 were credited with the sinking of HMS Tigris in a post-war evaluation. On 27 February 1943 Uj-2210 was escorting a convoy south east of Capri and made an attack on a submarine contact. This produced signs of a successful attack (oil and an air bubble): Tigris failed to return to base on 6 March and Uj-2210's contact and attack was deemed the most likely to have been responsible for her loss.

Following Pollmann's promotion and departure, Uj-2210 continued anti-submarine activities, but with no further success reported.

== Fate ==
On 28 May 1944, while in the Ligurian Sea, Uj-2210 was spotted and attacked by American motor-torpedo-boats. She was hit by a torpedo and sank off Deiva Marina, breaking in two.

== Wreck ==
The wreck of Uj-2210 lies at a depth of 68 metres (223 ft) and is a popular (though dangerous) wreck site for sport divers. The stern is resting on the sea bottom, while the stem of the ship is standing vertical, rising 25 metres (82 ft) from the sea bottom. However the wreck is in a fishing ground and is surrounded by discarded fishing nets, making any approach hazardous, while the depth requires specialized breathing arrangements.
