= Harald Damsleth =

Norwegian pro-Nazi cartoonist (1906–1971)

Harald Damsleth (16 August 1906 – 1 March 1971) was a Norwegian cartoonist, illustrator and ad-man. Damsleth was a member of Norway's home-grown fascist party, Nasjonal Samling, and became their most ardent propagandist after they came to power under German occupation in 1942.

Damsleth is best known as a pro-Nazi propagandist for his posters for Nasjonal Samling (NS) during World War II.

== Early life and work ==
Born in Bremen on 16 August 1906, Harald Damsleth had a Norwegian father and German mother. His father soon returned to Norway to work at Fredrikstad Mekaniske Verksted, whereas Harald Damsleth lived with his mother until the age of eleven. Upon his mother's death in 1917, Damsleth moved to Norway to grow up with his godfather, bank director Erling Sandberg. During a study tenure in Germany from 1929 to 1931, Damsleth met the German citizen Liselotte Friedmann, whom he engaged to marry. She did not move to Norway until 1935.

In 1933 Damsleth worked and studied in the United States. He visited Chicago and Hollywood, where he drew for Walt Disney. When he received an offer from Disney in 1939 to work for him, in connection with a new visit to the United States, Damsleth declined out of consideration for his family.

During his younger days, Damsleth was primarily a professional in the field of advertising. He worked for several advertising agencies in Oslo before taking over Myres reklamebyrå and in 1939 Heroldens annonsebyrå together with together with Erling Sandberg's son Per. Per Sandberg managed the business, Damsleth the design. In addition to advertising, he drew book covers, postcards, posters for the Norwegian Mountain Touring Association and more. However, Damsleth did nurture antipathies for socialism, and was a Norwegian nationalist. His illustrations were inspired by the Norwegian scenery and healthy, blonde people (Arne Skouen once described him as a "specialist on Aryan facial traits"). On the other hand, he was to a degree inspired by modernist art. He was involved in Fedrelandslaget for some time, and joined Nasjonal Samling, the Norwegian Fascist Party, already in 1933, its foundation year. He did not actually pay the membership fee until 1939, but upon the German invasion of Poland that year, he invigorated his support for the party, and paid the fees for the years 1933 to 1939.

== World War II ==
Propaganda poster from 1944.

Norway was invaded by Germany in 1940, and occupied for the following five years. Erling Sandberg was eventually appointed to Josef Terboven's Council of State, and Harald Damsleth began receiving assignments for public service announcements in April 1940, shortly after the invasion. From October the same year Herolden was given a monopoly on state announcements. Damsleth also designed nearly all stamps issued in Norway between 1940 and 1945. Among the stamps designed by Damsleth were the three stamps of the shipwreck series commemorating civilian Norwegian passenger ships lost to allied attack. The ships portrayed on the stamps were SS Barøy, SS Irma and SS Sanct Svithun. His monopoly was not only caused by the national socialist sympathies nurtured by employees in Herolden, but also because other advertising agencies boycotted the occupant regime. At the same time, Damsleth lost his professional contact with publishing houses.

Damsleth prolifically produced propaganda posters, almost 200 in all. He drifted away from modernism, a style considered "degenerate" by national socialists, and painted in a more naturalistic style. At the beginning of the war, his posters depicted normal, working people. However, near the end of the war, the posters began expressing military and war themes, including strong Russophobic sentiments.

Damsleth was also a SS-Kriegsberichter (war reporter in the Waffen-SS), and participated in a soldier's course in Berlin in 1942 before he was sent to the Eastern Front for a few months to get inspiration for his recruitment posters.

== Post-war career ==
Damsleth was tried in a court on 15 May 1945, only a week after the liberation of Norway. He pleaded not guilty of treason. He claimed he was unaware of the actions conducted by national socialist authorities. In 1950, Damsleth was sentenced to five years of hard labor for treason committed during World War II, but was pardoned after two years served.

After the War, Damsleth returned to politically neutral work, illustrating book covers and postcards, including many with nisse motifs. The books covers ranged from Christian books, pulp novels, and collection items called glansbilder. He also experimented with psychedelic art.

He died on 1 March 1971.
