= Leif Husebye =

Leif Husebye (29 April 1926 – 9 August 2009) was a Norwegian sailor, sports journalist and newspaper editor.

In his younger days he was an active sport sailor. He competed in the snipe class, and a bronze medal in the European Championships and a sixth place in the World Championships were his foremost results. He was a reserve for the Norwegian Olympic team of 1952.

His career in journalism started when he was hired in Morgenposten as a temp in 1946, by sports editor and former runner Hjalmar Johannessen. He eventually became sports editor himself. In November 1969 he was promoted to editor-in-chief. Industrialist Sverre Munck owned the newspaper at the time, but died in 1970. The newspaper, which had been among Norway's largest, went defunct in 1971. Shortly after Morgenposten's last issue on 31 March 1971, Husebye was hired in Aftenposten where he worked as subeditor and sports editor. He also followed the development of Aftenposten Aften closely, and was also a Norway correspondent for Politiken for three years. He also wrote books. He retired as a journalist in 1993.

Husebye lived in Sandvika. He died in August 2009.
