= Asbjørn Engen =

Norwegian newspaper editor

Asbjørn Engen (31 October 1917 – 17 October 1985) was a Norwegian newspaper editor and organizational leader.

In 1948 he was hired as secretary general in Landsforeningen mot kreft. It was newly founded at the time, and is since a 1998 merger known as the Norwegian Cancer Association. In 1950 Engen moved on to become a journalist in Morgenposten. He became manager in 1951, and editor-in-chief in 1951. He withdrew from this position shortly before the takeover by industrialist Sverre Munck. Between 1967 and the early 1980s he worked as information director in Scandinavian Airlines System in Stockholm. He was a member of the board of directors of the Norwegian Journalist Academy for ten years. He was also a board member of Norske Avisers Landsforening, since a 1992 merger known as the Norwegian Media Businesses' Association,

He was decorated as Knight, First Class of the Order of the White Rose of Finland and the Order of the Dannebrog. He died in October 1985. Long after his death it became known that Libertas, a semi-secret libertarian organization, had owned Morgenposten (as well as Verdens Gang) during his entire period as editor-in-chief. It has been said that Engen, with this backing, "politicized" the formerly "apolitical" newspaper.
