= HMS Tigris (N63) =

Submarine of the Royal Navy

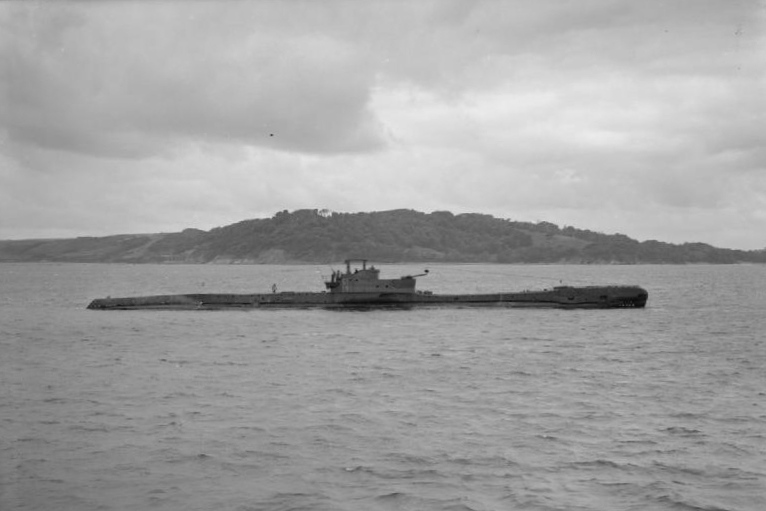
- HMS Tigris in Plymouth Sound in July 1942

History

United Kingdom
- Name: HMS Tigris
- Namesake: Tigris
- Builder: Chatham Dockyard
- Laid down: 11 May 1938
- Launched: 31 October 1939
- Commissioned: 20 June 1940
- Identification: Pennant number N63
- Fate: Sunk by Axis forces, 27 February 1943
- Badge

General characteristics
- Class & type: T-class submarine
- Displacement: 1,090 tons surfaced; 1,575 tons submerged
- Length: 275 ft (84 m)
- Beam: 26 ft 6 in (8.08 m)
- Draught: 16.3 ft (5.0 m)
- Propulsion: Two shafts; Twin diesel engines 2,500 hp (1.9 MW) each; Twin electric motors 1,450 hp (1.08 MW) each
- Speed: 15.25 knots (28.24 km/h) surfaced; 9 knots (17 km/h) submerged
- Range: 4,500 nautical miles (8,300 km) at 11 knots (20 km/h) surfaced
- Test depth: 300 ft (91 m) max
- Complement: 59
- Armament: 6 × internal forward-facing 21 inch (533 mm) torpedo tubes; 4 × external forward-facing torpedo tubes; 1 × external backward-facing torpedo tube; 6 × reload torpedoes; 1 x QF 4-inch (102 mm) deck gun

HMS Tigris was a T-class submarine of the Royal Navy. She was laid down at Chatham Dockyard and launched in October 1939.

== Career ==
Tigris had a relatively active career, serving in the North Sea and the Mediterranean.

=== Home waters ===
Tigris was active in the Bay of Biscay from July 1940, under the command of Commander Howard Bone. She sank the French fishing vessels Sancte Michael, Cimcour, Charles Edmond and Rene Camaleyre, the French merchantmen Jacobsen and Guilvinec, and the German tanker Thorn. She unsuccessfully attacked a number of submarines, including the German submarine U-58 On 5 October 1940, Tigris made an unsuccessful attack on two Italian submarines off Bordeaux, Reginaldo Giuliani and Maggiore Baracca.

On 5 July 1941 Tigris torpedoed and sank the Italian submarine Michele Bianchi 150 nm off the Gironde estuary as the Italian submarine was on passage to the Atlantic.

She was assigned to operate in the North Sea near the Scandinavian coast in mid-1941. Off the coast of Finnmark, she sank the Norwegian passenger/cargo ships Haakon Jarl and Richard With, In the case of Richard With, the ship sank in less than a minute, killing two of the three German soldiers on board and claiming the lives of 101 Norwegian civilians.

Post-war, the Norwegian public was told the attacks had been carried out by Soviet submarines. She also attacked and badly damaged the German auxiliary submarine chaser Uj-1201 off the Rolvsøy Fjord. The bow of the ship sank but the stern was towed to port and the ship was rebuilt, entering service again in April 1944. In addition, Tigris unsuccessfully attacked the German merchant ship Bessheim and a merchantman of 3,000 tons; she also attacked a convoy, but missed her targets; the Norwegian merchant ships Mimona, Tugela and Havbris.

=== Mediterranean ===
Tigris was reassigned to the Mediterranean, and was active there from late 1942. On 6 December, she torpedoed and sank the Italian submarine Porfido, for which her commander, George Colvin, was later awarded the Distinguished Service Order. On 21 January 1943, she sank the Italian merchant ship Citta di Genova in the Strait of Otranto. This ship was carrying Greek officers, who were being taken to Italy as hostages; many of them perished.

== Sinking ==
Tigris left Malta on 18 February 1943 to patrol off Naples. On 22 February the Italian merchant ship Teramo was attacked by a British submarine, believed to have been Tigris. She was last sighted at 0730 on 24 February, 39 miles (63 km) from Capri. On the morning of 27 February, the German submarine chaser UJ 2210, commanded by Otto Pollmann, was escorting a convoy six miles southeast of Capri. She made contact with a submarine and carried out three depth charge attacks, the third attack brought oil to the surface and the contact was noted to be stationary. A fourth attack of fifteen depth charges brought a huge bubble of air up. On 6 March, Tigris was ordered to Algiers but there was no reply to this signal. She failed to return to Algiers on 10 March 1943 and was declared overdue on that date. It is believed that Tigris was the submarine sunk with all hands on 27 February by UJ-2210.

== Tributes ==
The submarine had been adopted by the town of Newbury during the Second World War as part of Warship Week. The plaque from this adoption is held by the National Museum of the Royal Navy in Portsmouth.

Each year there is an annual Remembrance Service for the submarine and the crew lost at St Nicolas Church, Newbury, Berkshire, on the Sunday nearest 27 February. In 2016, the Remembrance Service was held on 24 July at 11.45 a.m. to allow descendants of her last commander, George Colvin, to attend. In 2017, it will be on 26 February. In 2018, the 75th and final commemoration is scheduled for 8 July From 2019 onwards a small memorial service will be held at the Royal British Legion Newbury branch on the Sunday nearest 27 February.

== Publications ==
- Colledge, J. J.; Warlow, Ben (2006) [1969]. Ships of the Royal Navy: The Complete Record of All Fighting Ships of the Royal Navy from the 15th Century to the Present (3rd Rev ed.). London: Chatham Publishing. ISBN 978-1-86176-281-8. OCLC 67375475.
- Hutchinson, Robert (2001). Jane's Submarines: War Beneath the Waves from 1776 to the Present Day. London: HarperCollins. ISBN 978-0-00-710558-8. OCLC 53783010.
- Kemp, Paul J. (1990). The T-Class Submarine: The Classic British Design. Annapolis, Maryland, USA: Naval Institute Press. ISBN 9781557508263.
- Rohwer, Jürgen; Hümmelchen, Gerhard (1992). Chronology of the War at Sea 1939–1945. London: Greenhill Books. ISBN 1-85367-117-7.
