= Sverre Munck =

Norwegian businessman

Sverre Munthe-Kaas Munck
- Born: July 5, 1898; Høvik, Norway
- Died: January 26, 1970 (aged 71); Oslo, Norway
- Education: Norwegian Institute of Technology
- Spouse: Elisa Margrethe "Lisken" Anthonisen
- Children: Oskar A. Munck (among others)

Sverre Munthe-Kaas Munck (5 July 1898 – 26 January 1970) was a Norwegian businessperson.

== Early life and career ==
He was born in Høvik as the son of dean Oskar Albert Munck (1868–1956) and Mathilde Munthe-Kaas (1871–1906). He was also a great-grandson of Johan Storm Munch. He grew up in the islands northwest of the city of Bergen (present-day Øygarden Municipality). He took his examen artium at Frogner School in 1916 and a degree in electrical engineering at the Norwegian Institute of Technology in 1921. In October 1925 he married Elisa Margrethe "Lisken" Anthonisen. Their son Oskar A. Munck became best known among their children.

In 1924 he founded his own company, which came to be known as Sverre Munck Elektro-Mekanisk Industri. After a time of struggle, the company profited from the upward economic cycles of the late 1930s and the post-World War II period. The main products were cranes, elevators and tackles, but also trolleybuses and excavators. The company had production facilities in Bergen, Fusa, Bøvågen, Hamar, and Langesund, and also expanded abroad.

== Later career ==
In 1946 Munck passed down the management of the company to his sons. He continued as chairman of the board. He was a local chairman and national board member of the Norwegian Engineer Association. In 1967 he bought the newspaper Morgenposten, which until then had been owned by the semi-secret libertarian organization Libertas. During Libertas' ownership, the former editor-in-chief Asbjørn Engen had reportedly "politicized" the formerly "apolitical" newspaper.

Munck's own political views has been described as idiosyncratic. He was a supporter of politician Bertrand Dybwad Brochmann during the 1930s. He was an opponent of national socialism, but also socialism and trade unionism. He was a strong proponent of individual "spiritual" development, and of a "quality democracy" instead of a "mass democracy". Norsk biografisk leksikon notes that "often, he was not understood" as a public debater.

Similarly, his takeover of Libertas was not regarded well by everyone. The editor-in-chief who replaced Engen shortly before Munck's takeover, Christian leader Per Voksø, resigned with immediate effect in March 1967. Much of the staff followed. After a stint with Gunnar Kristiansen as acting editor-in-chief, Munck took over as editor, and sat until 1969. He was succeeded by Leif Husebye, sports editor who had remained with the newspaper during the 1967 tumults. Munck continued as newspaper owner, but died in January 1970 in Oslo. Morgenposten suffered from a downward trend, and ultimately went defunct in 1971.
