= Ragnar Halvorsen =

Norwegian businessman and organizational leader (1924–2019)

- Born: 23 May 1924; Fredrikstad, Norway
- Died: 15 February 2019 (aged 94); Oslo, Norway
- Occupation: Businessperson
- Awards: Order of St. Olav

Ragnar Halvorsen (23 May 1924 – 15 February 2019) was a Norwegian businessman and organizational leader.

Halvorsen was born in Fredrikstad to Alf Ragnvald Halvorsen and Ellen Fredrikke Jensen, and married Anna Ødegård in 1949.

He was assigned with the dynamite production company Norsk Sprængstofindustri/Dyno Industrier from 1961 to 1995, as CEO from 1981 to 1987, and chairman of the board from 1987 to 1995. During this period Dyno developed into a major international company, with subsidiaries in about forty countries. Halvorsen chaired the Norwegian Export Council from 1987. He was the first President of the employers' organization Confederation of Norwegian Enterprise, for four years from its foundation in 1989 through a merge between the Norwegian Employers' Confederation and the Federation of Norwegian Industries. He was decorated Knight, First Class of the Order of St. Olav in 1987.

Business positions
Preceded by Oskar A. Munch	Chairman of the Norwegian Export Council; 1987–1992	Succeeded by
