= Oskar A. Munch =

Norwegian businessperson

Oskar Andreas Munch (7 July 1928 – 1 February 2017) was a Norwegian businessperson. He started his career in the company of his father, Sverre Munck, and eventually became chairman of Elektrisk Bureau and Asea Brown Boveri.

== Personal life ==
Oskar Andreas Munck was born in Bergen as the son of businessman Sverre Munthe-Kaas Munck (1898–1970) and Elisa Margrethe "Lisken" Anthonisen. In 1950 he married Eldrid Berg Johnsen, a daughter of director Olav Johnsen.

== Career ==
He finished his secondary education in 1947, and studied at the University of Grenoble and in the United States. From 1952 to 1955 he was manager in Bergenhus Canning Company before being hired in his father's eponymous company in 1955. He became manager in Munck International in 1956, mercantile director in Sverre Munck in 1960 and chief executive officer from 1963 to 1971. He was also deputy chairman of the board from 1963 and chairman from his father's death in 1970. From 1971 he was the chief executive of Bergen Industri-Investering.

In the 1960s and 1970s he steadily became a board member of more and more corporations. He was a board member of Bergens Mekaniske Verksteder from 1962, Vesta and Investa from 1966; Bergen Industri-Investering, National Industri, Merinospinneriet, Elektro-Generator, Nera, De Forenede Ullvarefabrikker and Fortex from 1968, Hygea from 1970; Anker Batterifabrikker from 1971 and Honey-Bull from 1972. He was also a consul for Brazil and decorated as an Officer of the Order of Rio Branco.

In 1973, while still heading Bergen Industri-Investering, he also came on the executive board of Elektrounion. He started planning a takeover of Elektrisk Bureau (EB), but this did not come to fruition. Instead, Investa where he was a board member bought Elektrisk Bureau, and after that, EB bought Elektrounion and incorporated that company in 1986. EB was shortly after bought by Asea Brown Boveri (ABB). Munch chaired Elektrisk Bureau from 1986 and ABB from 1989, later chairing the corporate council.

Munch chaired the Norwegian Export Council from 1981 to 1987 and was a council member in Det Norske Veritas and the Guarantee Institute for Export Credits. He was also a board member of IBJ Schrøder Bank, New York from 1986 to 1996, and chaired International Pipeline Products and Roche Norge. In the cultural sphere, Munch chaired the National Theatre Friends Association. In 1988 he was decorated as a Knight, First Class of the Order of St. Olav.

He moved to Oslo in 1976 and resided in Ullern.

Munch died on 1 February 2017, aged 88.

Business positions
Preceded by Gerhard Heiberg	Chairman of the Norwegian Export Council; 1981–1987	Succeeded by Ragnar Halvorsen
