= Moholmen Lighthouse =

Coastal lighthouse in Vågan, Norway

Moholmen Lighthouse Moholmen fyrstasjon
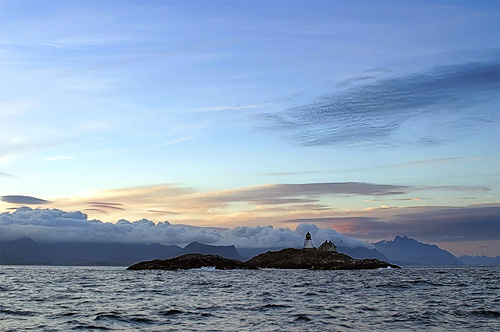
- View of the lighthouse
- Location of the lighthouse
- Location: Vågan Municipality, Nordland, Norway
- Coordinates: 68°09′27″N 14°24′18″E

Tower
- Constructed: 1914
- Construction: cast iron
- Automated: 1974
- Height: 13.3 metres (44 ft)
- Shape: square truncated pyramid tower
- Markings: white with red top

Light
- First lit: 1936
- Focal height: 23.1 metres (76 ft)
- Intensity: 54,900 candela
- Range: Red: 10.9 nmi (20.2 km; 12.5 mi) Green: 10.4 nmi (19.3 km; 12.0 mi) White: 13.5 nmi (25.0 km; 15.5 mi)
- Characteristic: Oc(2) WRG 8s
- Norway no.: 752500

Moholmen Lighthouse (Norwegian: Moholmen fyr) is a coastal lighthouse in Vågan Municipality in Nordland county, Norway. The lighthouse is located on a small island in the Vestfjorden about 4 kilometres (2.5 mi) southwest of the village of Kabelvåg and about 10 kilometres (6.2 mi) straight west of the Skrova Lighthouse.

== History ==
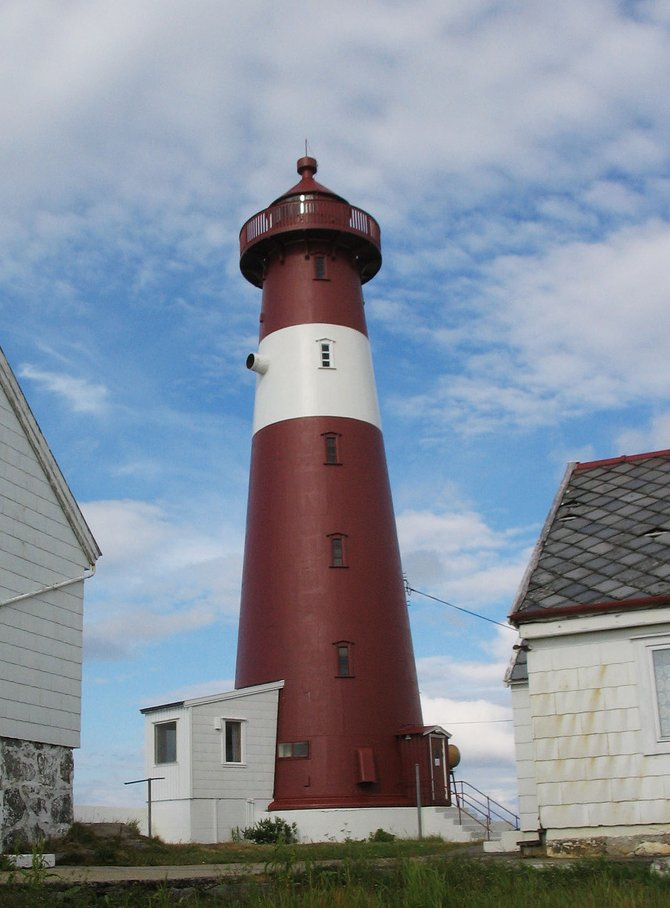
This is the original tower that was moved from Moholmen to Tranøy, Hamarøy

Moholmen Lighthouse was originally built in 1914. The original tower was moved to the island of Tranøy in Hamarøy Municipality in 1936. A new tower was built at Moholmen, and that tower was automated in 1974. The current tower is 13.3 metres (44 ft) tall, and at the top there is a white, red or green light (depending on direction), occulting twice every 8 seconds. The 54,900-candela light can be seen for up to 13.5 nmi (25.0 km; 15.5 mi). The white tower is cast iron and built in a square pyramidal shape.

== See also ==
- Lighthouses in Norway
- List of lighthouses in Norway
