= Ervik Church =

Church in Vestland, Norway

- Ervik kyrkje
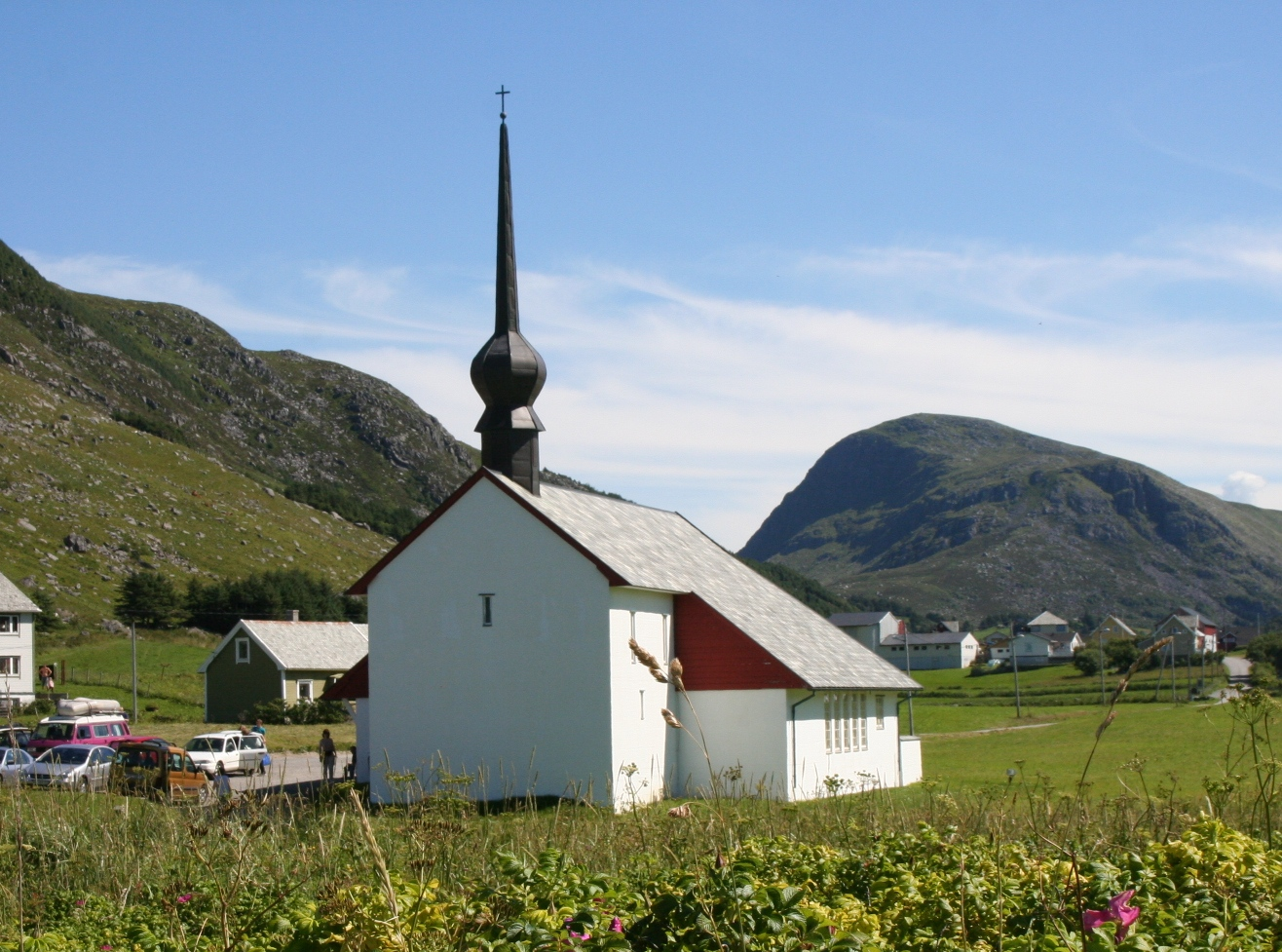
- View of the church
- Ervik Church
- 62°10′00″N 5°07′02″E
- Location: Stad Municipality, Vestland
- Country: Norway
- Denomination: Church of Norway
- Churchmanship: Evangelical Lutheran

History
- Status: Parish church
- Founded: 1970
- Consecrated: 14 June 1970

Architecture
- Functional status: Active
- Architect(s): Olav S.Platou and Arnstein Arneberg
- Architectural type: Long church
- Completed: 1970 (56 years ago)

Specifications
- Capacity: 180
- Materials: Brick

Administration
- Diocese: Bjørgvin bispedømme
- Deanery: Nordfjord prosti
- Parish: Ervik
- Norwegian Cultural Heritage Site
- Type: Church
- Status: Not protected
- ID: 84103

Ervik Church (Norwegian: Ervik kyrkje) is a parish church of the Church of Norway in Stad Municipality in Vestland county, Norway. It is located in the village of Ervika at the northern end of the Stadlandet peninsula. It is the church for the Ervik parish which is part of the Nordfjord prosti (deanery) in the Diocese of Bjørgvin. The white, brick church was built in a long church design in 1970 using plans drawn up by the architectural firm Arnstein Arneberg. The church seats about 180 people.

The church is the location to a memorial to those killed during the sinking of the SS Sanct Svithun during World War II.

== History ==
Ervika has been the site of a church graveyard since before the year 1550. It is possible that there once stood a small chapel on the site. Traditionally, the parish priest would go to Ervika once each year to hold a worship service and bury their dead. Typically that service was held around Christmas until the early 1800s when the service was moved to around Jonsok. In 1906, the cemetery area was fenced in and in 1907 a bell tower was built on the site. In 1965, the parish received permission to build a chapel on the site. The parish hired Olav S. Platau from the architectural firm Arnstein Arneberg to design the new chapel. It was a brick building with an onion dome and a tall, slender spire on top of its tower. This new chapel was completed in 1970 and it served as an annex chapel to the main Selje Church. The building was consecrated on 14 June 1970. In 1997, the building was upgraded to a full parish church and renamed Ervik Church.

== Media gallery ==
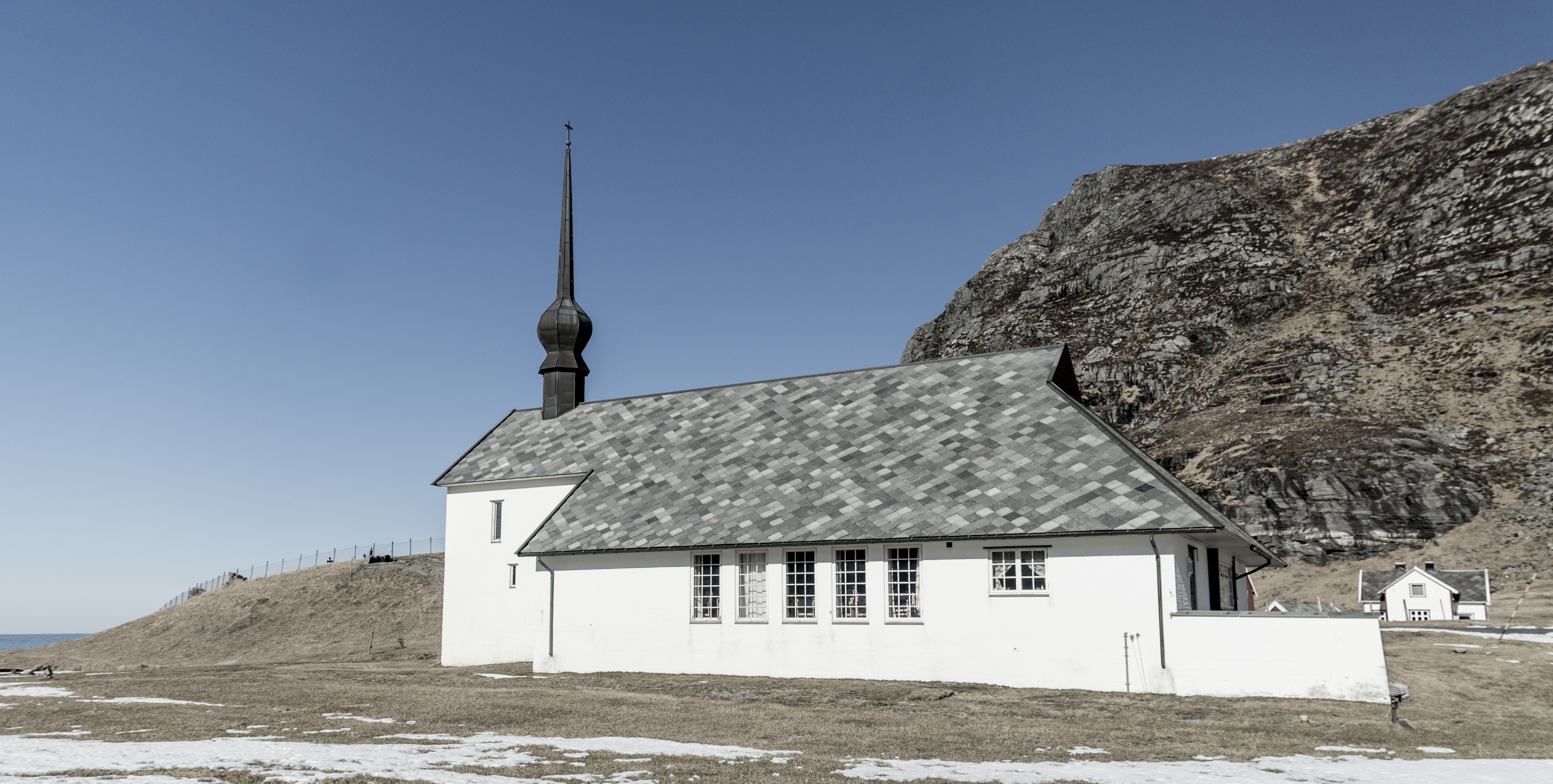

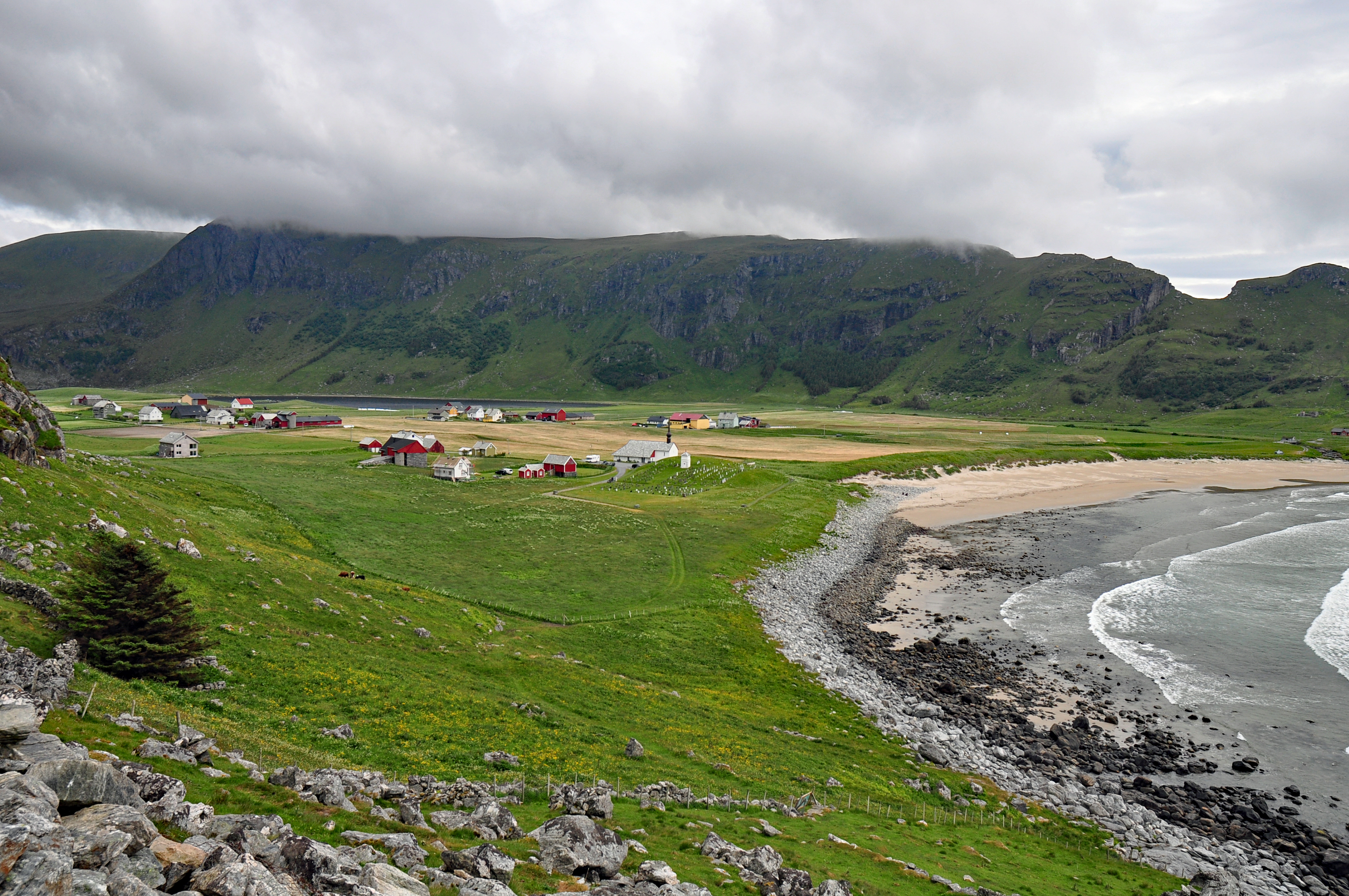

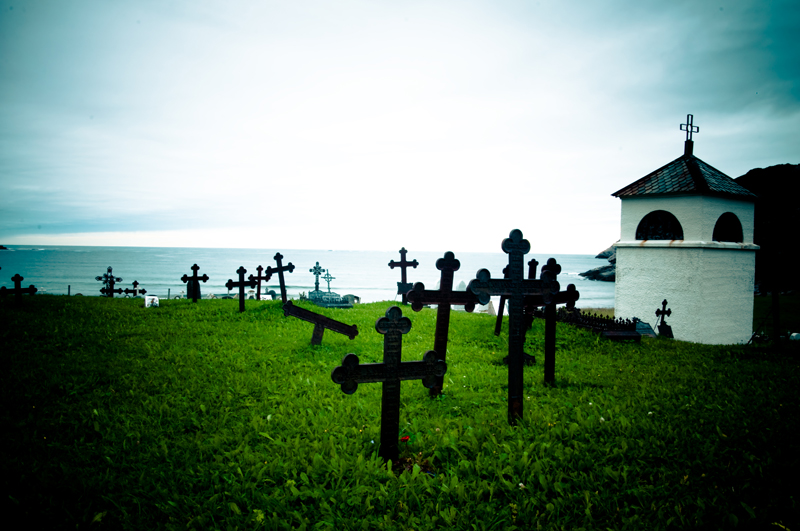

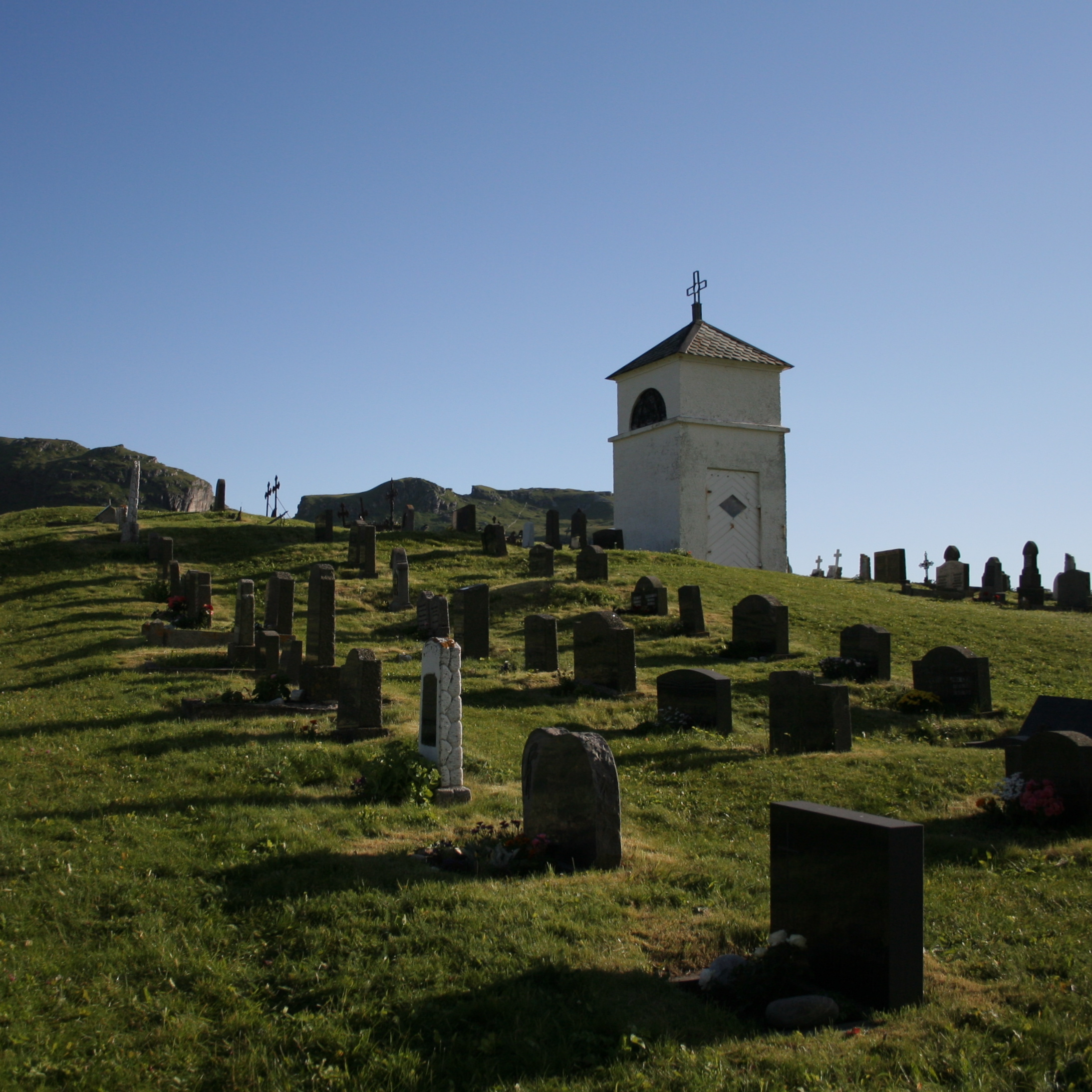

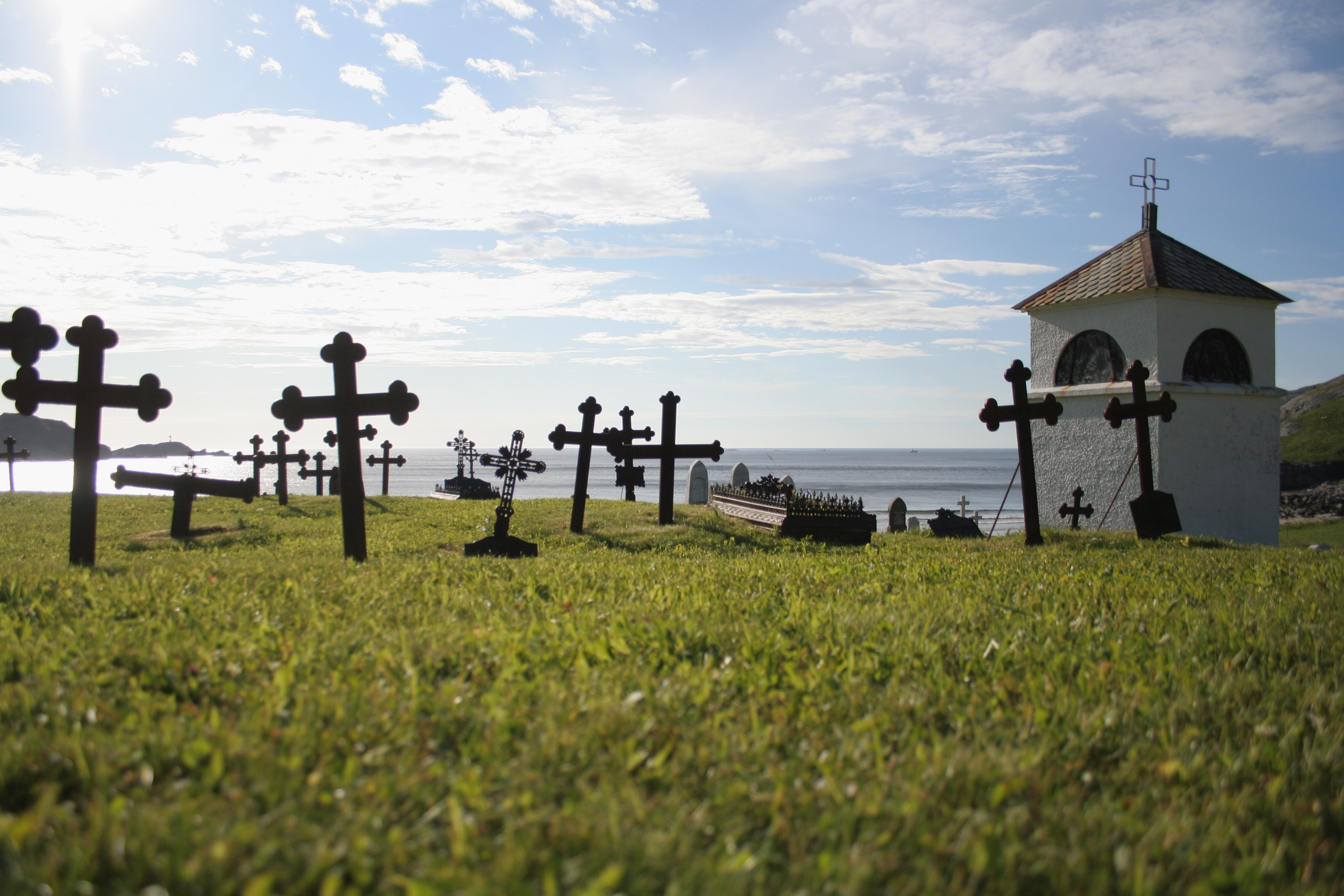

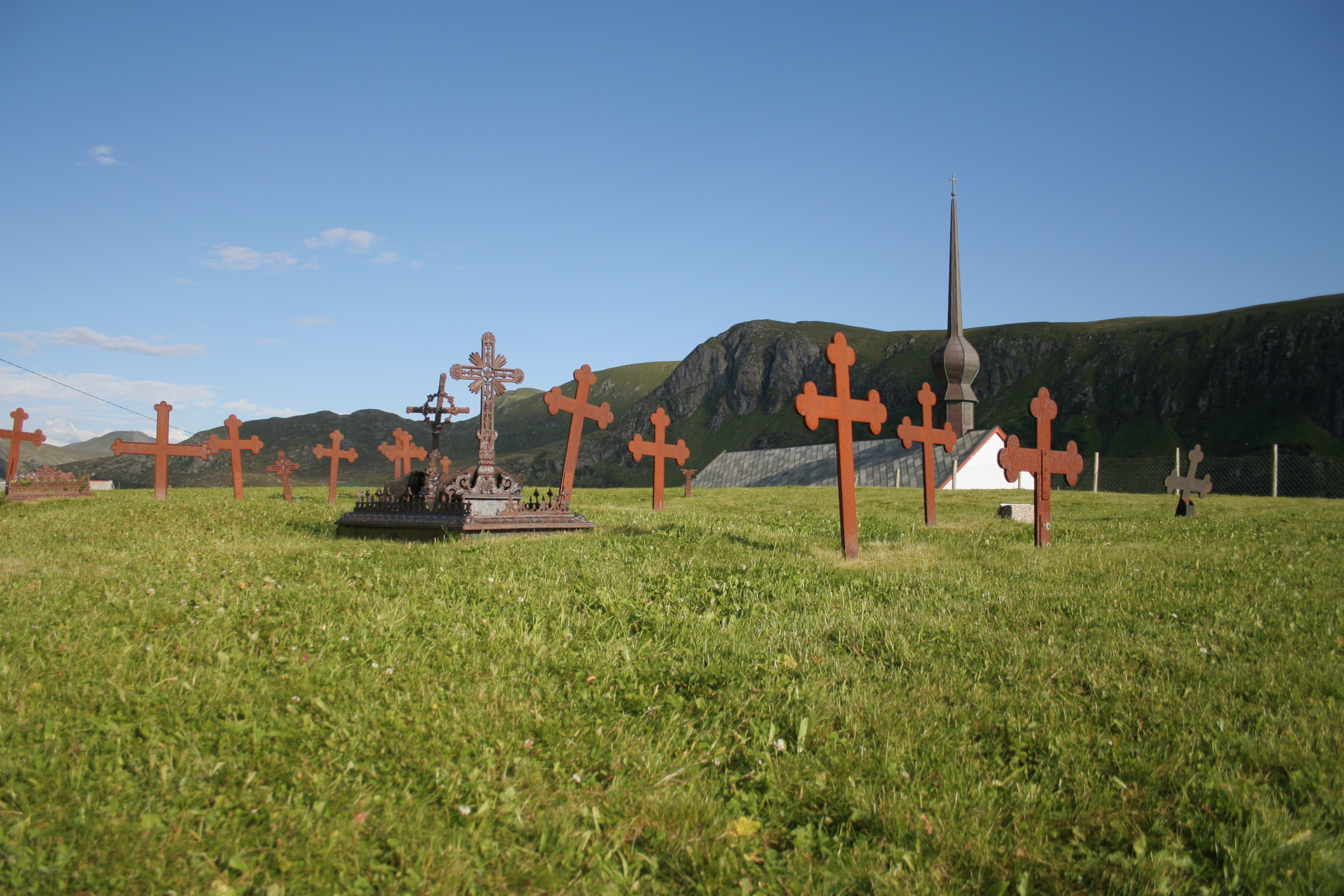

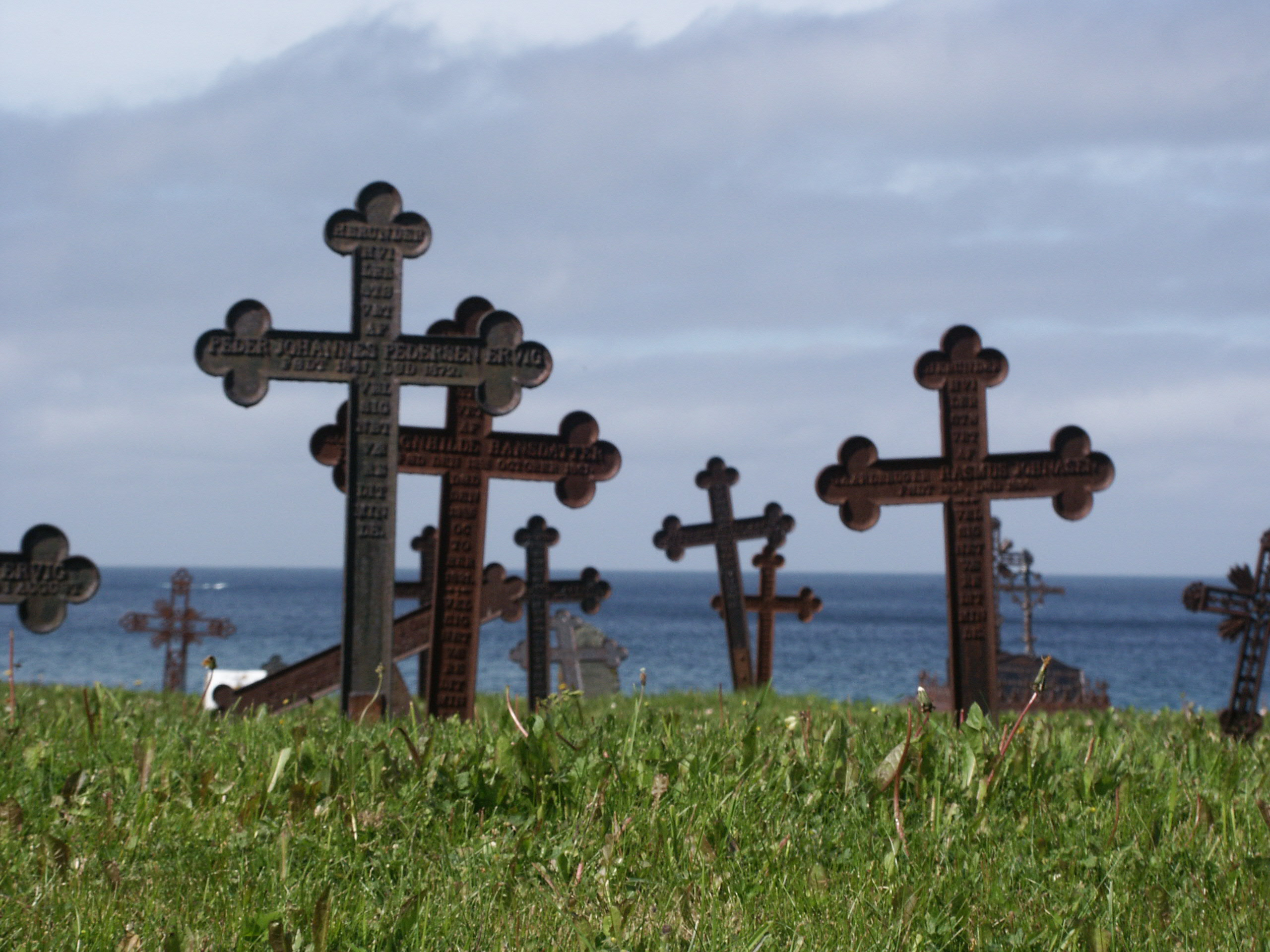

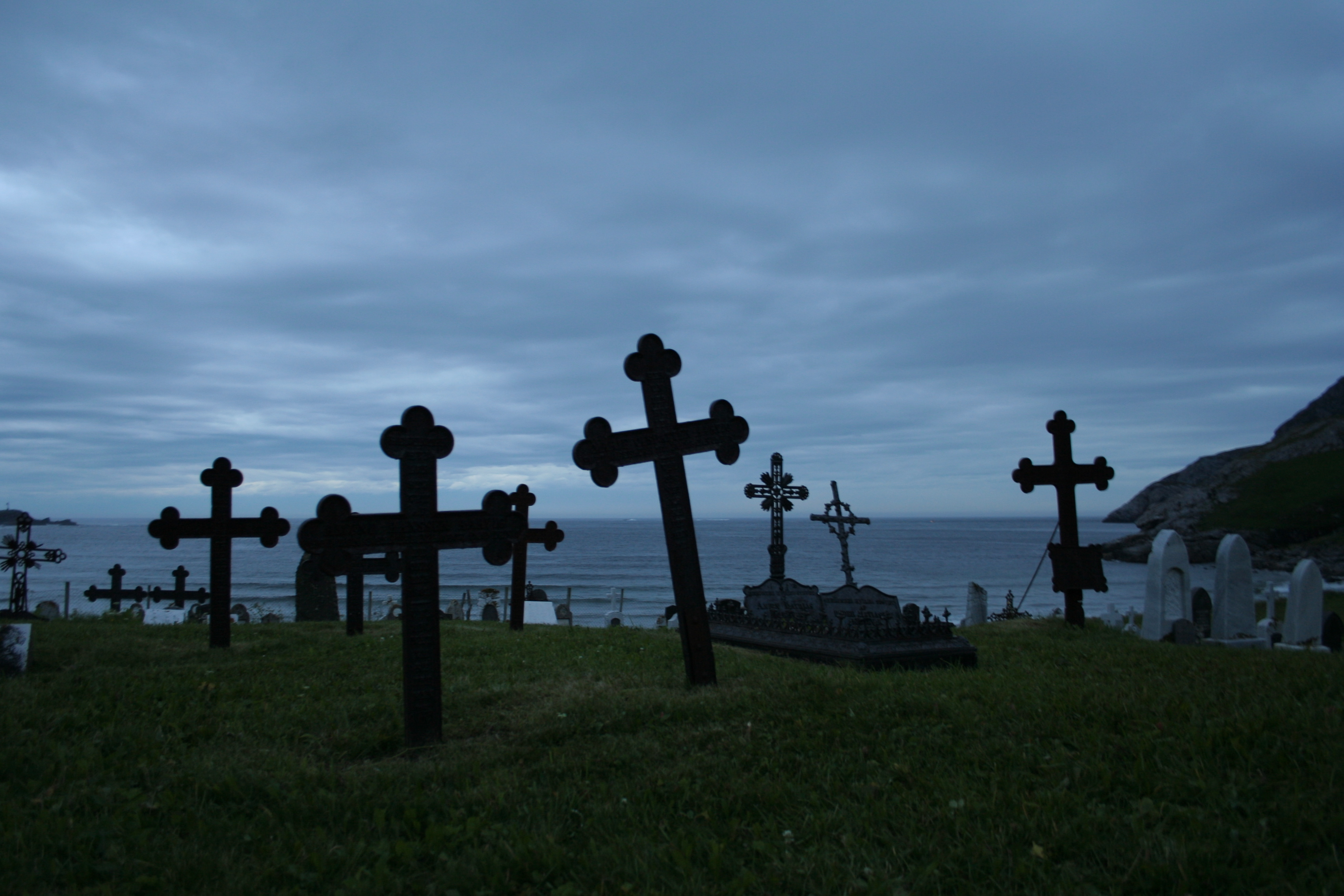

== See also ==
- List of churches in Bjørgvin
