= Leikanger Church (Selje) =

Church in Vestland, Norway

- Leikanger kyrkje
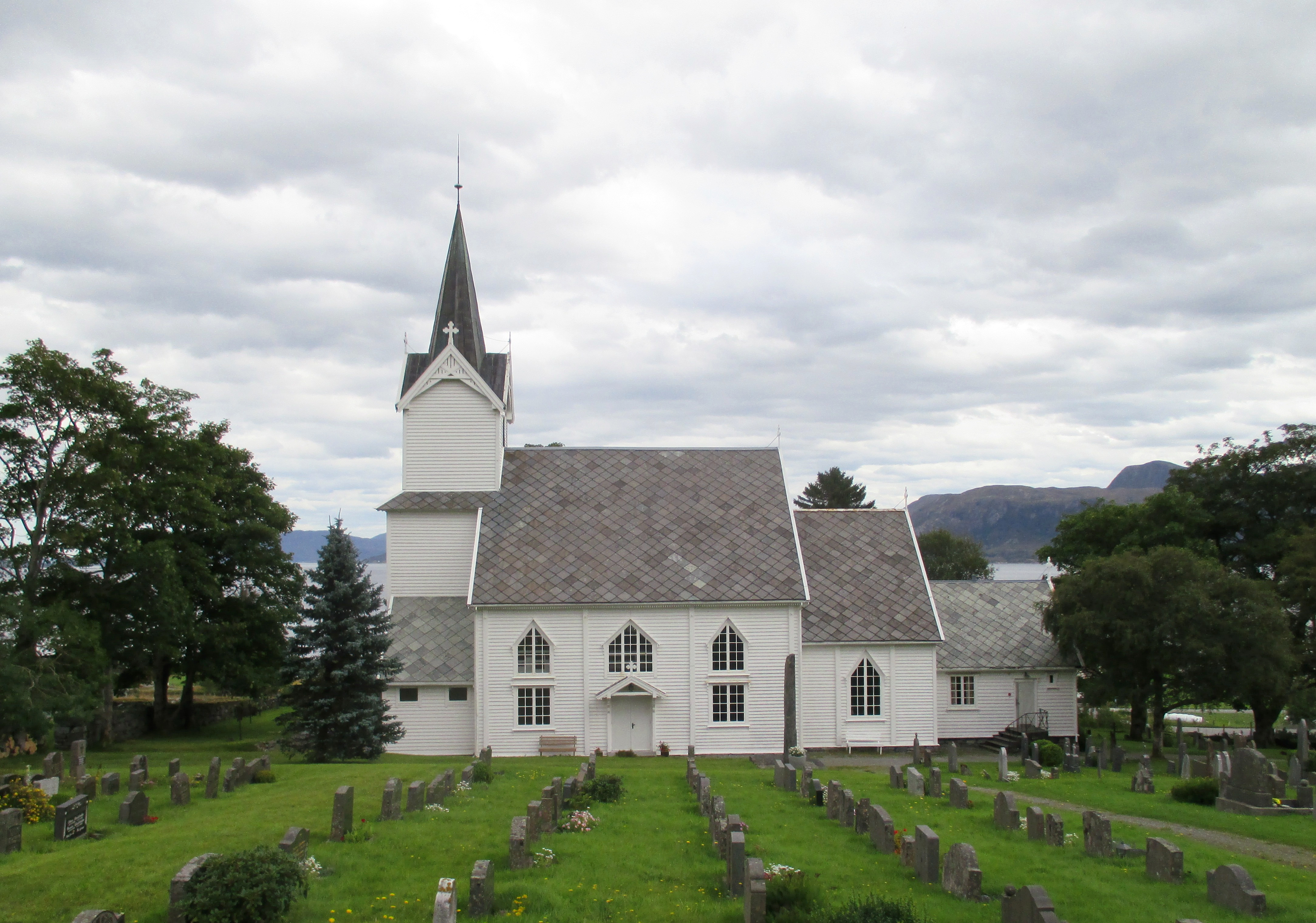
- View of the church
- Leikanger Church
- 62°07′06″N 5°18′45″E
- Location: Stad Municipality, Vestland
- Country: Norway
- Denomination: Church of Norway
- Churchmanship: Evangelical Lutheran

History
- Status: Parish church
- Founded: 1866
- Consecrated: 28 Oct 1866

Architecture
- Functional status: Active
- Architectural type: Long church
- Completed: 1866 (160 years ago)

Specifications
- Capacity: 370
- Materials: Wood

Administration
- Diocese: Bjørgvin bispedømme
- Deanery: Nordfjord prosti
- Parish: Leikanger
- Norwegian Cultural Heritage Site
- Type: Church
- Status: Not protected
- ID: 84277

Leikanger Church (Norwegian: Leikanger kyrkje) is a parish church of the Church of Norway in Stad Municipality in Vestland county, Norway. It is located in the village of Leikanger on the shore of the Vanylvsfjorden. It is the church for the Leikanger parish which is part of the Nordfjord prosti (deanery) in the Diocese of Bjørgvin. The white, wooden church was built in a long church design in 1866 using plans drawn up by an unknown architect. The church seats about 370 people.

== History ==
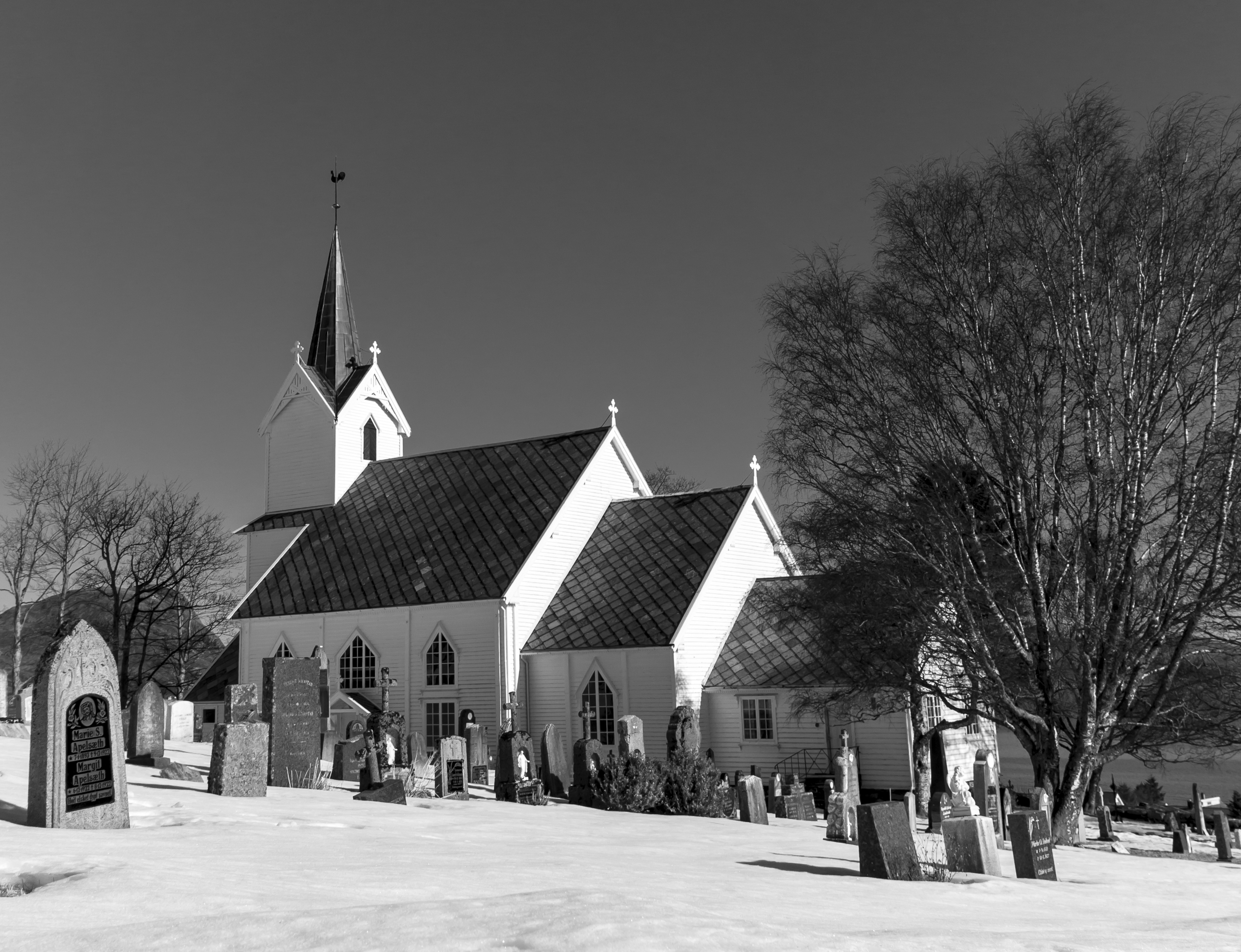
View of the church

In 1866, plans were made for building a new Selje Church in the village of Selje. To make room for the new, larger church building, the old church was torn down. The materials for the old church were saved and moved to the nearby village of Leikanger on the shore of the Vanylvsfjorden, about 10 kilometres (6.2 mi) north of the village of Selje. The parish used those materials to build a church at Leikanger to serve the people of the northern part of Selje. The church was consecrated on 28 October 1866 as Leikanger Chapel and at that time, it had a couple of hundred seats.

This church was quickly found to be too small for the congregation. In 1895, the building was expanded under the leadership of Lars Sølvberg. The west wall of the nave was moved further to the west. A new roof was built after the nave was enlarged. A lot of the old materials were replaced, so the resulting building was almos like new construction, although remnants of old materials in the walls can still be found here and there. The church also got a new church porch and tower. After this significant renovation, the church was unrecognizable compared to before. It was twice as large as before, with around 400 seats. In 1966, the church was renovated as well. In 1997, the chapel was upgraded to the status of parish church and at that time, it was renamed Leikanger Church.

== See also ==
- List of churches in Bjørgvin
