= Morgenposten =

Norwegian newspaper

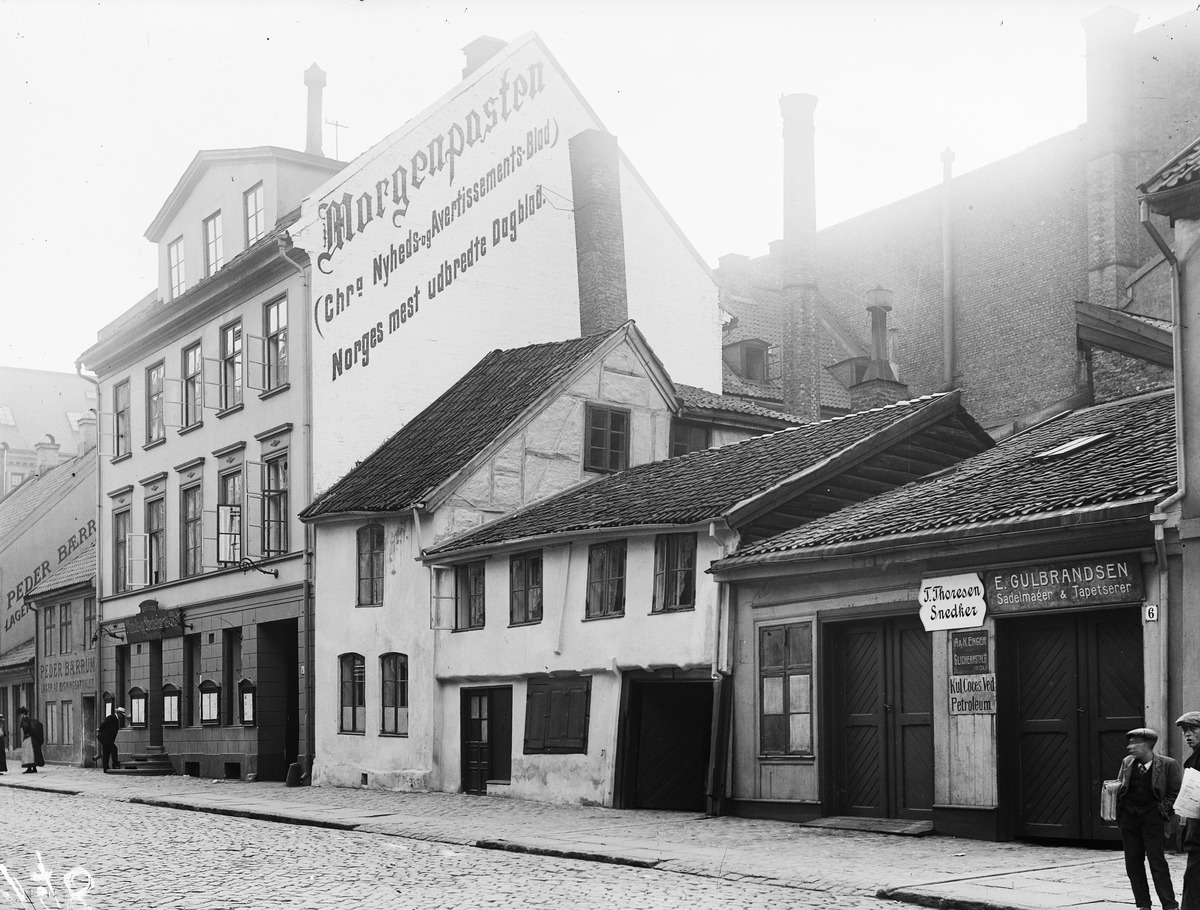
- The Morgenposten headquarters in Nedre Vollgate, Christiania, around 1900
- Type: Daily newspaper
- Founded: 1861
- Ceased publication: 1971
- Headquarters: Oslo

Morgenposten is a former Norwegian newspaper, issued in Oslo from 1861 to 1971. It was the largest newspaper in Norway from the 1870s until the early 1900s, when its name was Christiania Nyheds- og Avertissements-Blad, also nicknamed Sværta.

== Foundation and first years ==
The newspaper was founded in 1861 by William Nisson, under the name Christiania Avertissements-Blad, and from 1865 it was called Christiania Nyheds- og Avertissements-Blad. The title Morgenposten was a subtitle from 1866, and the main title of the newspaper from 1943. Thoralf Pryser edited the newspaper from 1918 to 1946, with exception from the last period of the German occupation of Norway, when he was replaced by the Nazi editor Olav Botolv Feiring from 1943. During the interwar period, the newspaper was Norway's third-largest newspaper, after Aftenposten and Arbeiderbladet.

== Second World War ==
During the occupation of Norway by Nazi Germany Morgenposten became the second largest newspaper in Norway after Aftenposten. In 1946 a trial, the so-called "prøvesaken", was held, in order to decide the questions of possible confiscation of profits during the war years. The trial was an important part of the legal actions against the press that followed World War II, as it had implications also for the treatment of other newspapers that had cooperated with the Nazi authorities. The Supreme Court decision from 1948 resulted in a confiscation of NOK 170,000.

== Post war ==
Per Voksø was editor-in-chief from 1964 to 1967. In 1967 the controversial industrialist Sverre Munck bought the newspaper. Following this one third of the journalists, including the editor, resigned. Munck himself served as editor-in-chief until 1969. Leif Husebye was editor-in-chief from 1969.

Morgenposten went defunct in 1971.
