= Norwegian Tunneling Society =

Professional association representing Norwegian tunnellers and rock blasters

The Norwegian Tunneling Society (Norwegian: Norsk Forening for Fjellsprengningsteknikk) or NFF is a professional association established in 1963 which represents the rock blasting and tunneling industry in Norway.
