= Ervik, Vestland =

Village in Stad Municipality, Norway

Ervik
- Village
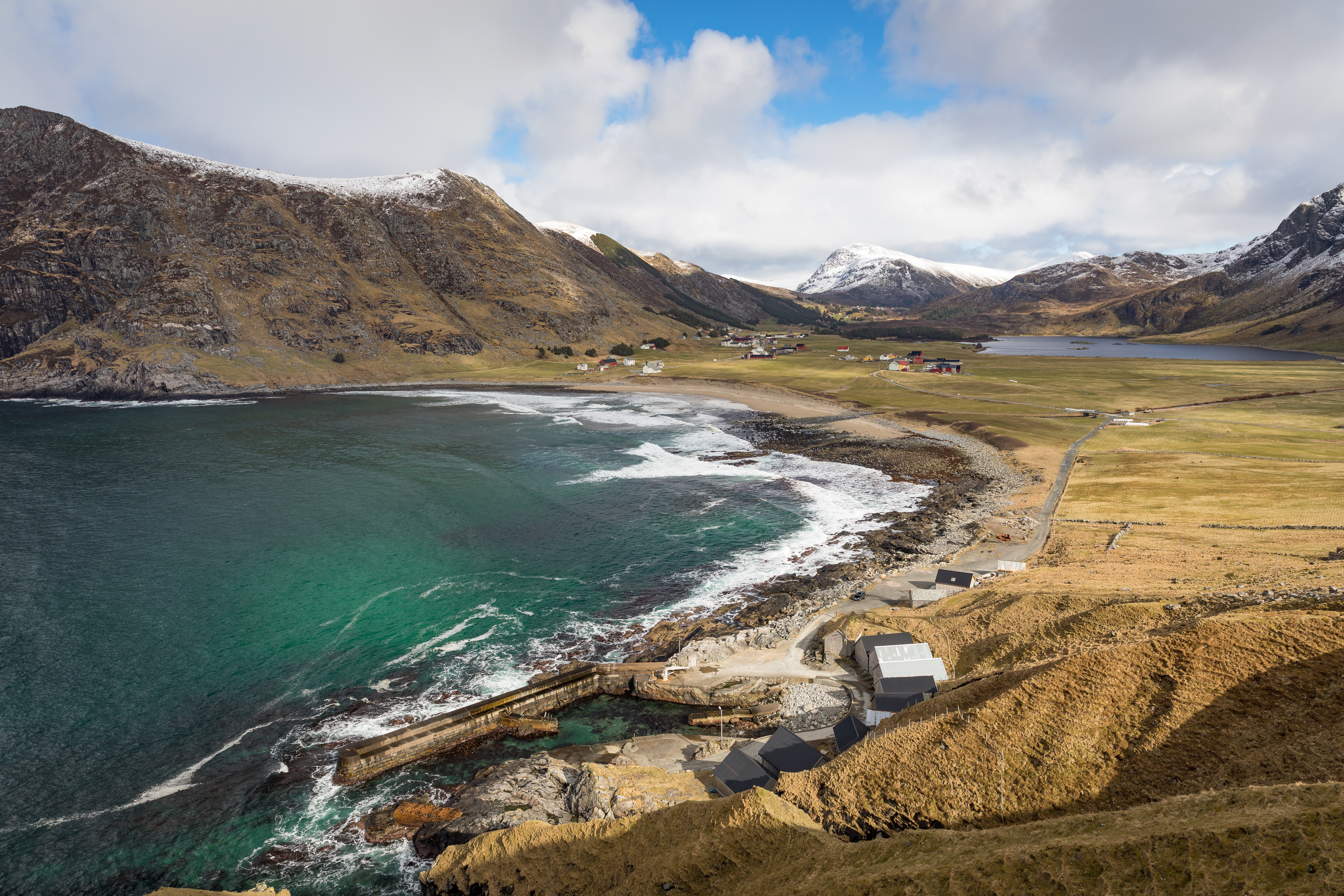
- View of Ervik and Erviksanden on Stadlandet
- Interactive map of Ervik
- Location within Vestland Location within Norway
- Coordinates: 62.1660°N 5.1234°E
- Country: Norway
- Region: Western Norway
- County: Vestland
- District: Nordfjord
- Municipality: Stad Municipality
- Elevation: 11 m (36 ft)
- Time zone: UTC+01:00 (CET)
  - Summer (DST): UTC+02:00 (CEST)
- Post Code: 6750 Stadlandet

Ervik is a village in Stad Municipality in Vestland county, Norway. The village is located on the northwestern tip of the Stadlandet peninsula, about 30 kilometres (19 mi) northwest of the village of Selje, and about 12 kilometres (7.5 mi) northwest of the village of Leikanger. The village sits at the southern base of the 497-metre (1,631 ft) mountain plateau, Kjerringa which forms a cliff that plunges almost vertically into the ocean at the northwestern end of the peninsula. It is one of the westernmost villages in mainland Norway.

Ervik Church is located in the village. There is a memorial at the church for the people who died when SS Sanct Svithun was bombed by Allied aircraft and sank off the coast of Ervik.

The village has a grocery store, kindergarten, and small school. The residents of Ervik work mostly with fishing and farming (mostly cattle, sheep, and goat farming). There is also a large beach area in the small bay along the coast of Ervik.
