= Leikanger, Selje =

Village in Stad Municipality, Norway

Leikanger
- Village
- Interactive map of Leikanger
- Location within Vestland Location within Norway
- Coordinates: 62.1186°N 5.3157°E
- Country: Norway
- Region: Western Norway
- County: Vestland
- District: Nordfjord
- Municipality: Stad Municipality

Area
  - Total: 0.57 km^{2} (0.22 sq mi)
- Elevation: 18 m (59 ft)

Population (2020)
  - Total: 364
  - Density: 639/km^{2} (1,660/sq mi)
- Time zone: UTC+01:00 (CET)
  - Summer (DST): UTC+02:00 (CEST)
- Post Code: 6750 Stadlandet

Leikanger is a village in Stad Municipality in Vestland county, Norway. The village is located along the Vanylvsfjorden on the eastern coast of the Stadlandet peninsula, about 12 kilometres (7.5 mi) southeast of the village of Ervik and the same distance north of the village of Selje. Leikanger Church is located in the village. There is some industry in the village as well as some small farming and fishing.

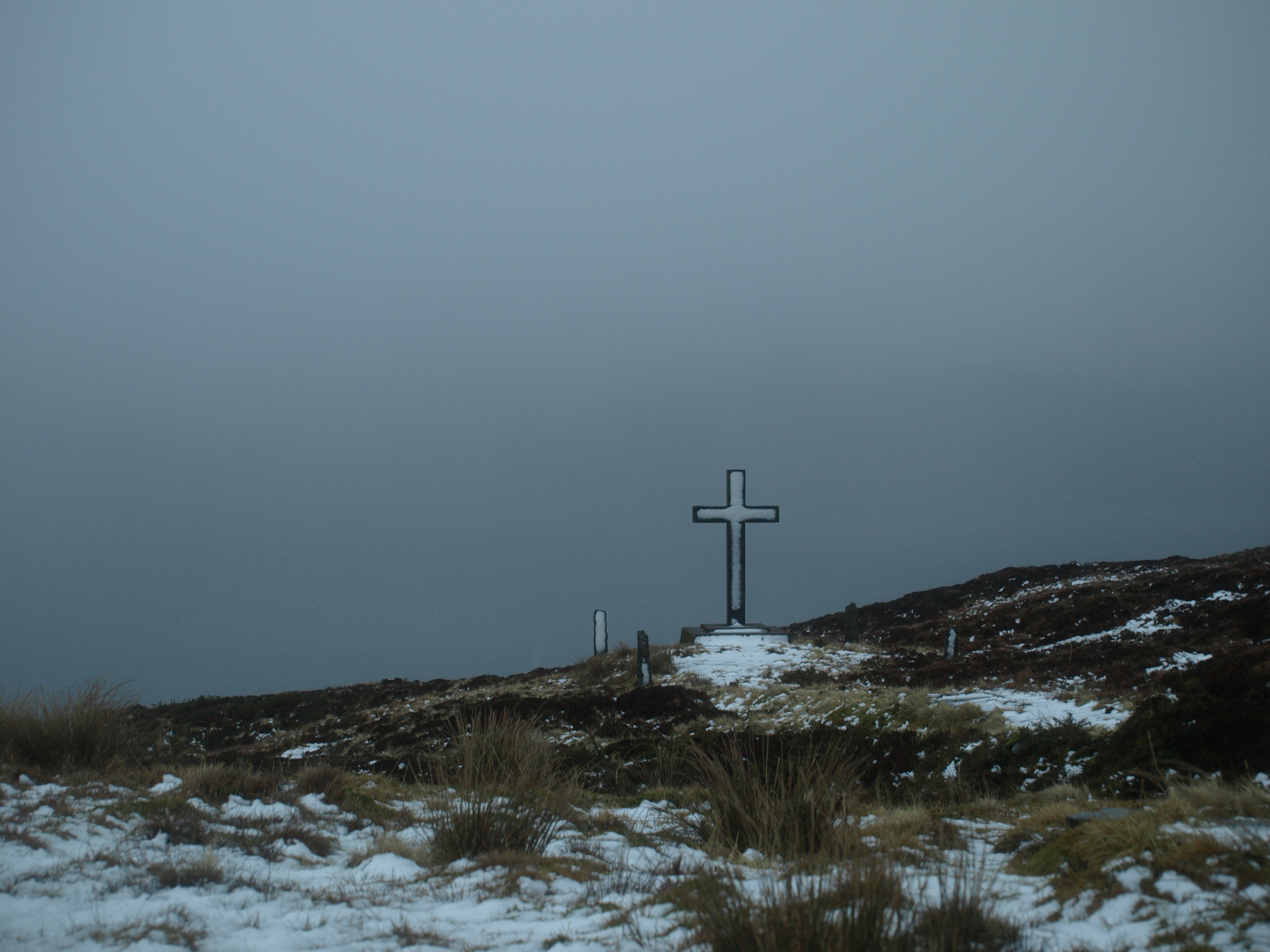
View of the stone cross at Dragseidet, just south of Leikanger

The 0.57-square-kilometre (140-acre) village had a population (2020) of 364 and a population density of 639 inhabitants per square kilometre (1,660/sq mi). Since 2020, the population and area data for this village area has not been separately tracked by Statistics Norway.

Just south of the village at Dragseidet is a large stone cross that was erected in 1913 to commemorate the meeting in 997 led by Olav Tryggvason to persuade the leaders of Norway to convert to Christianity.
