= Per Voksø =

Norwegian newspaper editor (1923–2002)

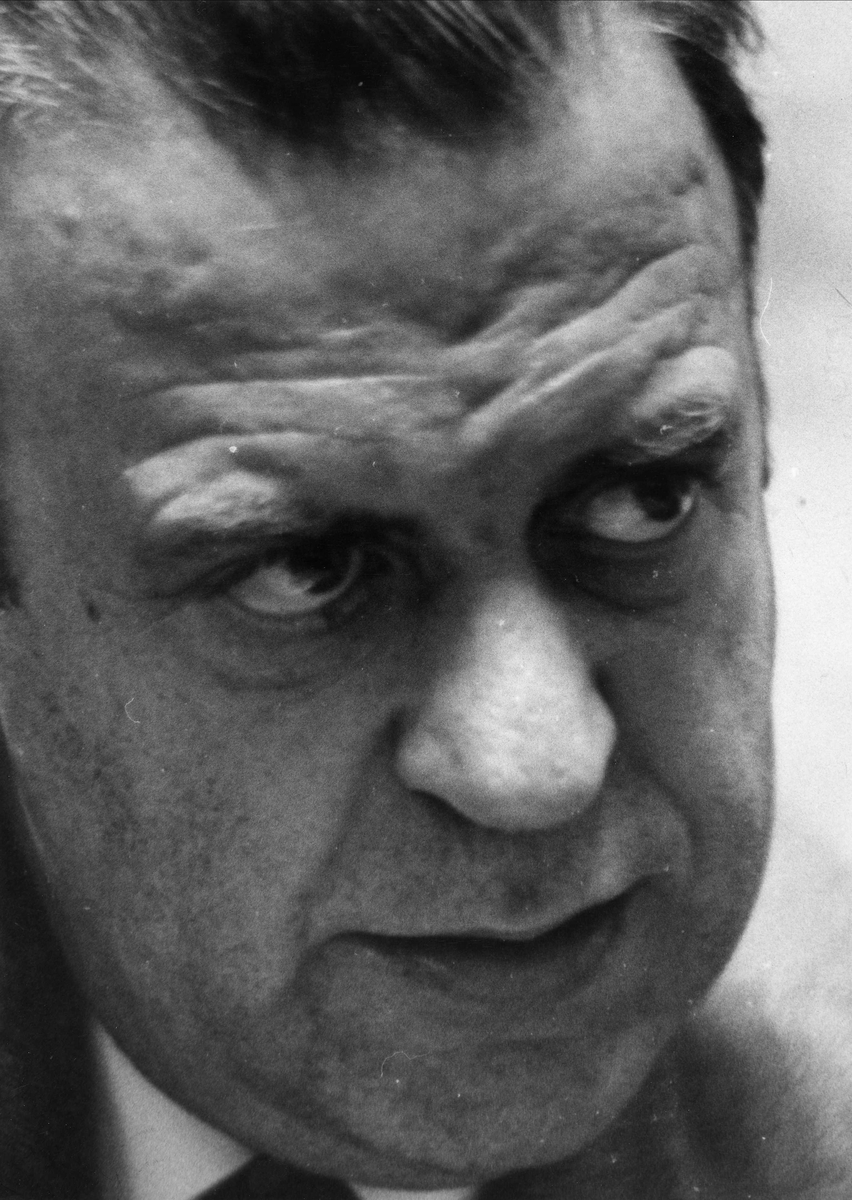
- Voksø, ca. 1970

Leader of the Church of Norway Council on Ecumenical and International Relations
- In office 1986–1990

Per Voksø (23 June 1923 – 28 December 2002) was a Norwegian newspaper editor and Christian leader.

He was born in Bergen as the son of Julius Peder Voksø (1888–1937) and Gudrun Larssen (1891–1972). He took commerce school in 1941 and examen artium in 1944. In 1945 he started as a journalist in Bergen's Christian newspaper, Dagen. He participated at the foundation congress of the World Council of Churches in 1948. In the same year he married shipmaster's daughter Doris Paulsen. They got four children together.

He was hired as subeditor of Vår Kirke in 1954, and Morgenposten in 1957. In late 1966 he was promoted to editor-in-chief. He succeeded Asbjørn Engen. However, shortly after the newspaper was bought by industrialist Sverre Munck. The previous owner was Libertas, a semi-secret libertarian organization. Voksø ran afoul with the new owner, and resigned after only three months in the editor's chair. He was succeeded by acting editor Gunnar Kristiansen. Until his retirement in 1986, Voksø worked as editor of publishing in Det Beste, the Norwegian version of the Reader's Digest.

Voksø chaired YMCA Norway from 1955 to 1964 and was a member of the executive committee of the international YMCA from 1955 to 1961 and 1968 to 1974. In the World Council of Churches he was a member of the central committee and executive committee from 1983 to 1991. He was also active in the Lutheran World Federation. He chaired the Church of Norway National Council from 1970 to 1978 and the Church of Norway Council on Ecumenical and International Relations from 1986 to 1990, and had ecumenical concerns. In 1998 he received the Norwegian Ecumenical Prize.

He was also a board member of the Church City Mission and Norwegian Church Aid, and chaired the latter organization from 1980 to 1986. All in all, he has been called "one of the most influential leaders within the Church of Norway" and "the most central layman in Norwegian post-war church life". In 1992 he was decorated as Knight, First Class of the Royal Norwegian Order of St. Olav. He died in December 2002 in Oslo.

Religious titles
Preceded by	Leader of the YMCA Norway; 1955–1964	Succeeded by
Preceded by	Leader of the Church of Norway National Council; 1970–1978	Succeeded by Ludvig Johan Bakkevig
Preceded by	Leader of the Church of Norway Council on Ecumenical and International Relations; 1986–1990	Succeeded by
