= SS Richard With =

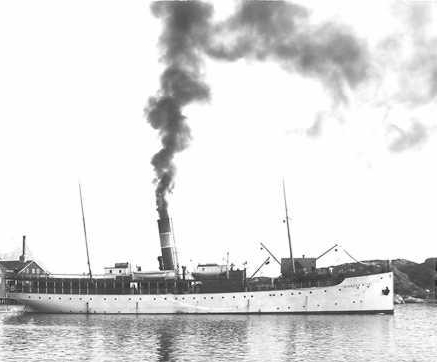

History

Norway
- Name: SS Richard With
- Acquired: 1909
- Fate: Sunk 1941

General characteristics
- Displacement: 905 metric tons
- Length: 62 m

SS Richard With was a steamship in the Hurtigruten passenger ship fleet in Norway. It was built in 1909. It was sunk by the British submarine HMS Tigris in 1941, which caused the death of 99 people.
