= Tranøya, Hamarøy =

Village in Hamarøy Municipality, Norway

Tranøya (Norwegian); Trádná (Lule Sami)
- Village
- Interactive map of: Tranøya (Norwegian); Trádná (Lule Sami)
- Location within Nordland Location within Norway
- Coordinates: 68.1835°N 15.6622°E
- Country: Norway
- Region: Northern Norway
- County: Nordland
- District: Salten
- Municipality: Hamarøy Municipality
- Elevation: 3 m (9.8 ft)
- Time zone: UTC+01:00 (CET)
  - Summer (DST): UTC+02:00 (CEST)
- Post Code: 8297 Tranøy

Tranøya (Norwegian)

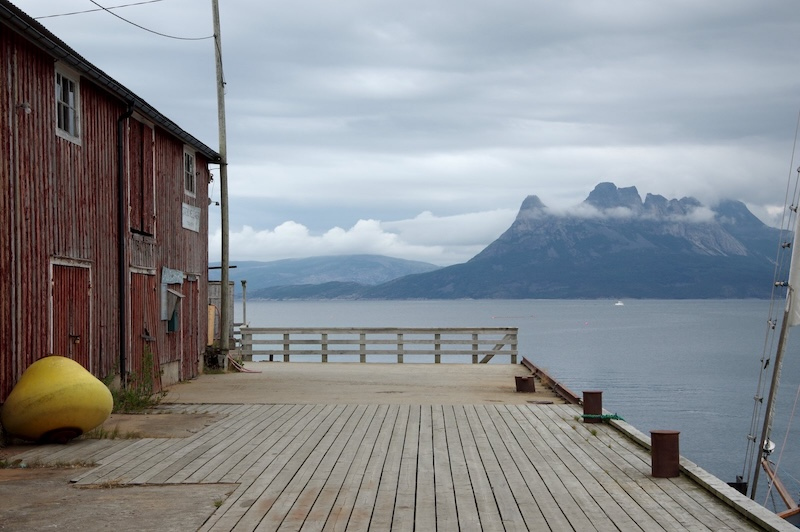

or Trádná (Lule Sami)[2] is a village and ancient trade centre in Hamarøy Municipality in Nordland county, Norway. It is located on the end of a peninsula about 14 kilometres (8.7 mi) north of the municipal centre, Oppeid. The Tranøy Lighthouse is located west of the village on a small islet connected to the mainland by a pedestrian bridge.

The novelist Knut Hamsun worked as a shop assistant at Tranøy in his younger days.
