= Evanger =

Evanger may refer to:

== Places ==
- Evanger (village), a village in Voss Municipality in Vestland county, Norway
- Evanger Municipality, a former municipality in the old Hordaland county, Norway
- Evanger Church, a church in Voss Municipality in Vestland county, Norway
- Evanger Station, a railway station in Voss Municipality in Vestland county, Norway
- Lake Evanger, or Evangervatnet, a lake in Voss Municipality in Vestland county, Norway
- Evanger Hydroelectric Power Station, a power plant in Voss Municipality in Vestland county, Norway
