= Evanger (village) =

Village in Voss Municipality, Norway

- Village
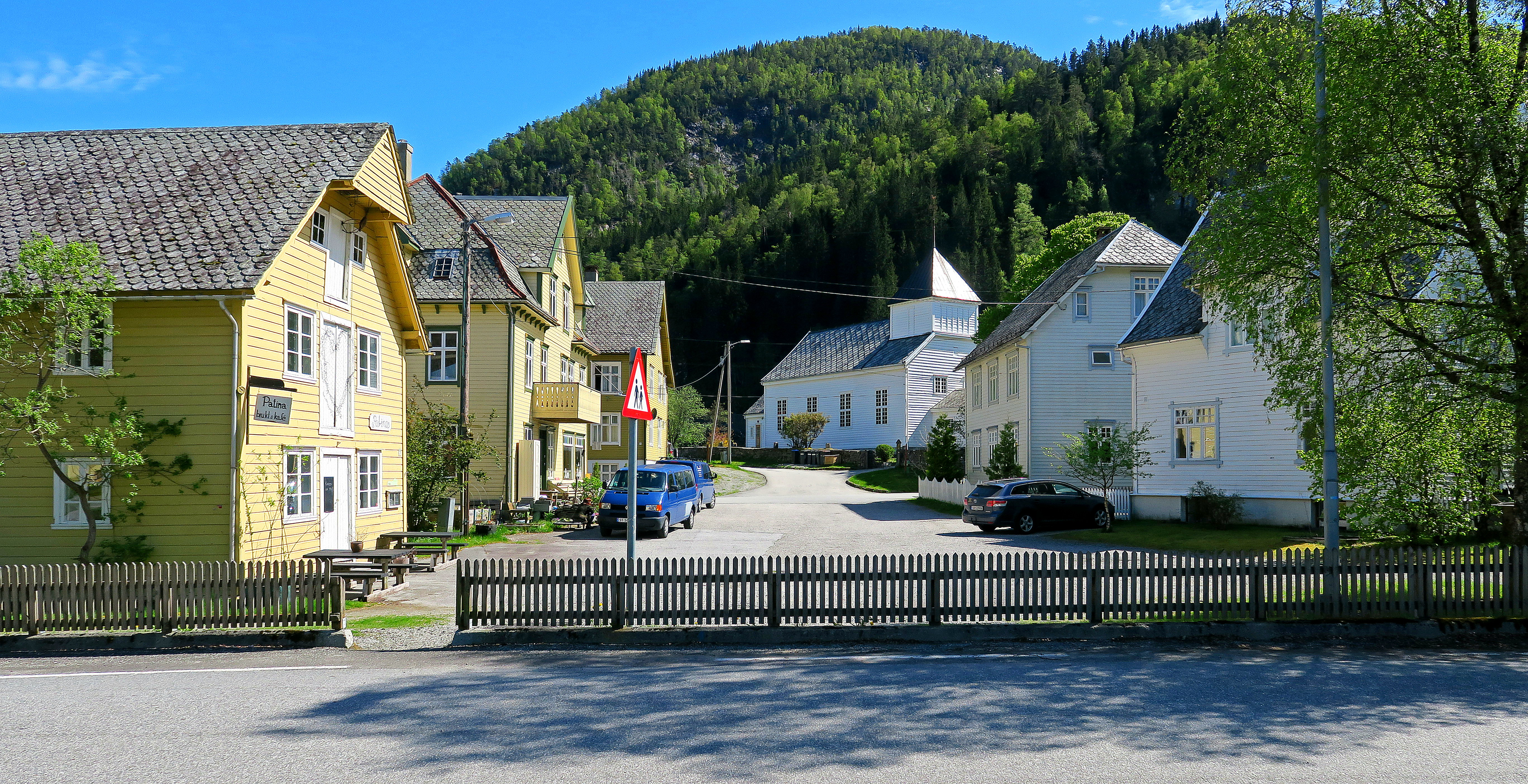
- View of the village
- Interactive map of Evanger
- Coordinates: 60.64722°N 6.11216°E
- Country: Norway
- Region: Western Norway
- County: Vestland
- District: Voss
- Municipality: Voss Municipality
- Elevation: 15 m (49 ft)
- Time zone: UTC+01:00 (CET)
  - Summer (DST): UTC+02:00 (CEST)
- Post Code: 5707 Evanger

Evanger is a village in Voss Municipality in Vestland county, Norway. The village lies in the western part of the municipality at the eastern end of the lake Evangervatnet where the river Vosso empties into the lake. Evanger sits about 20 kilometres (12 mi) west of the municipal centre of Vossevangen.

== History ==
The village of Evanger was the administrative centre of the old Evanger Municipality, which existed from 1885 until 1964. Evanger Church (Evanger kyrkje) is located in the village.

The European route E16 highway runs through the village, on its way from the city of Bergen to the village of Vossevangen. The Bergensbanen railway line stops at Evanger Station as the railroad goes through the village from the west coast of Norway to the eastern coast. Evanger has a sausage factory and some other small industries in the village.

The Evanger Hydroelectric Power Station (Evanger kraftverk) is built in the mountains just northwest of the village of Evanger. The power plant started production in 1969 and was modified in 1977. The power plant is supplied with water through a 34.3-kilometre (21.3 mi) long tunnel from the intake reservoir, the lake Askjelldalsvatnet to the north. The tunnel has a vertical drop of 770 metres (2,530 ft). The power plant receives water from the Eksingedalen and Teigdalen valleys. The power station is equipped with three Pelton turbines and is owned and operated by BKK.

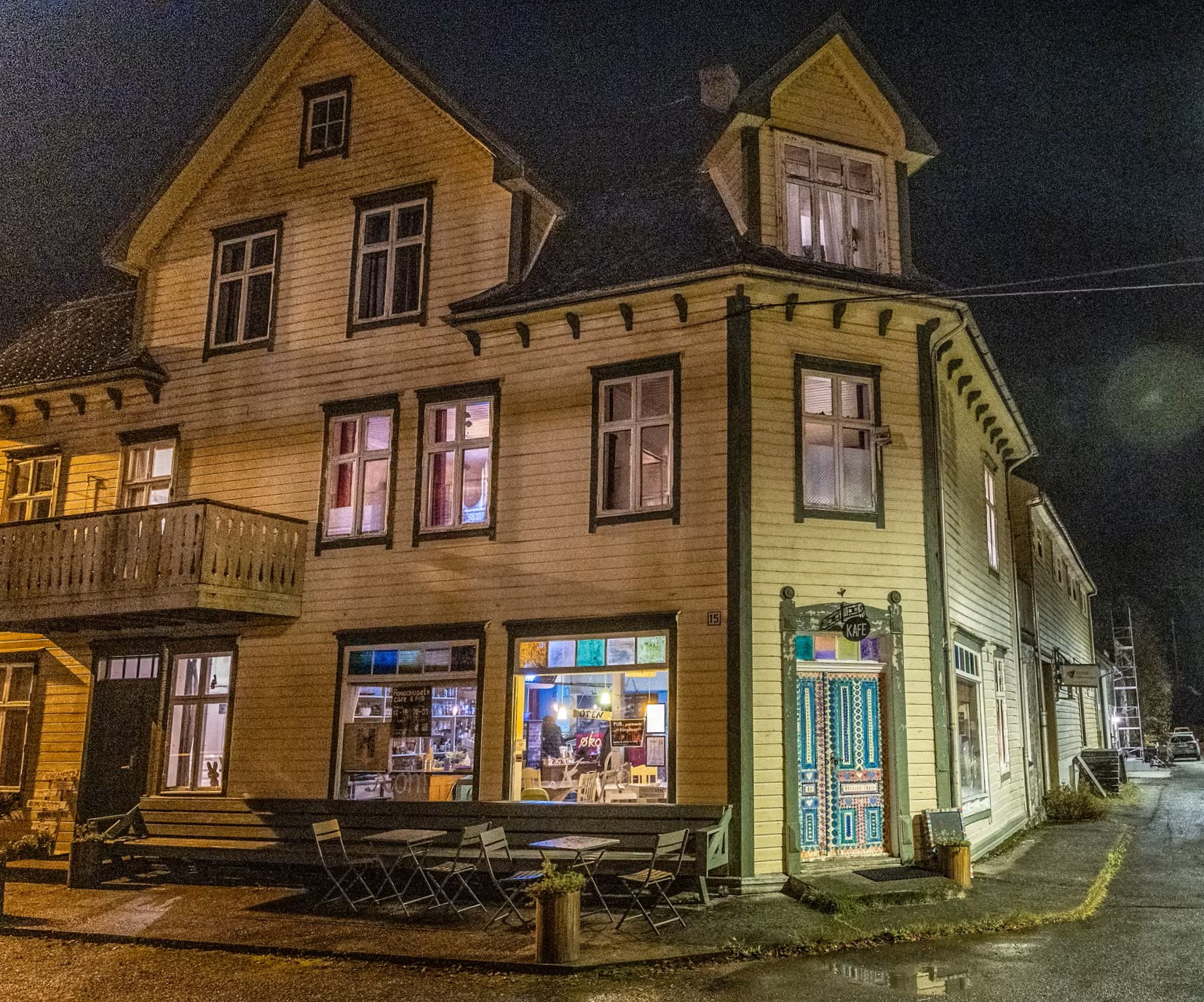
Café in Evanger

== Media gallery ==
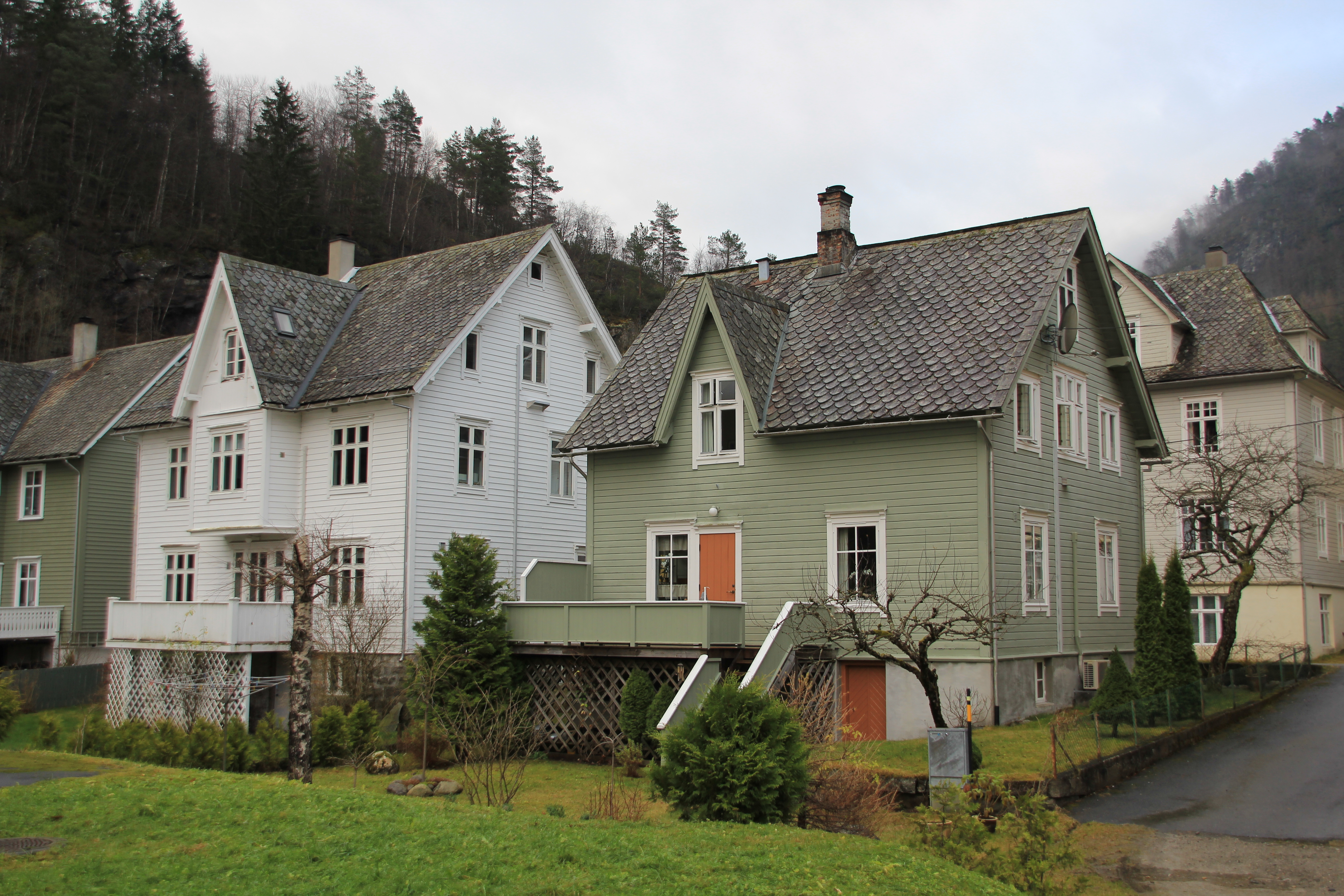
View of houses in Evanger

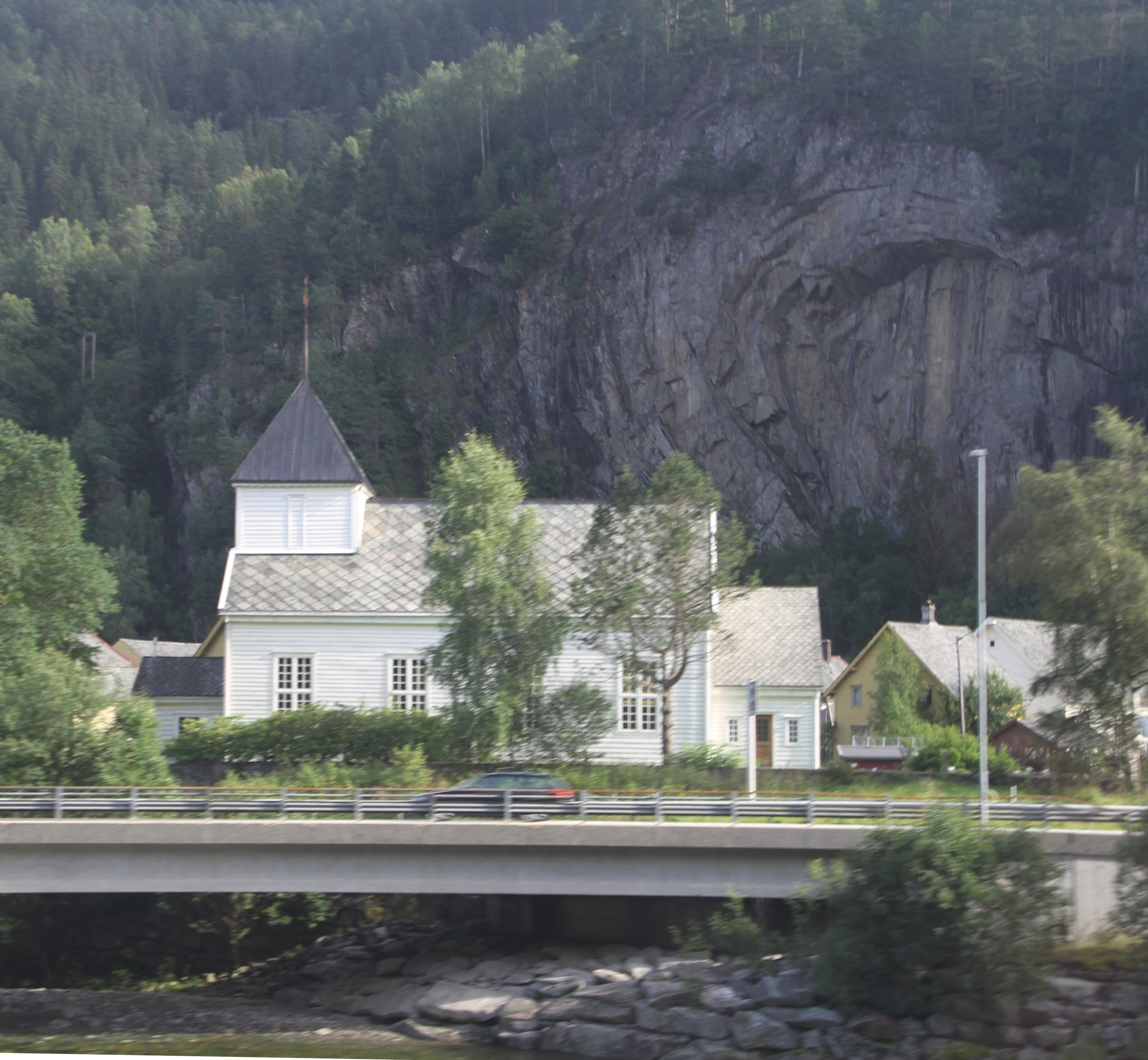
View of Evanger Church

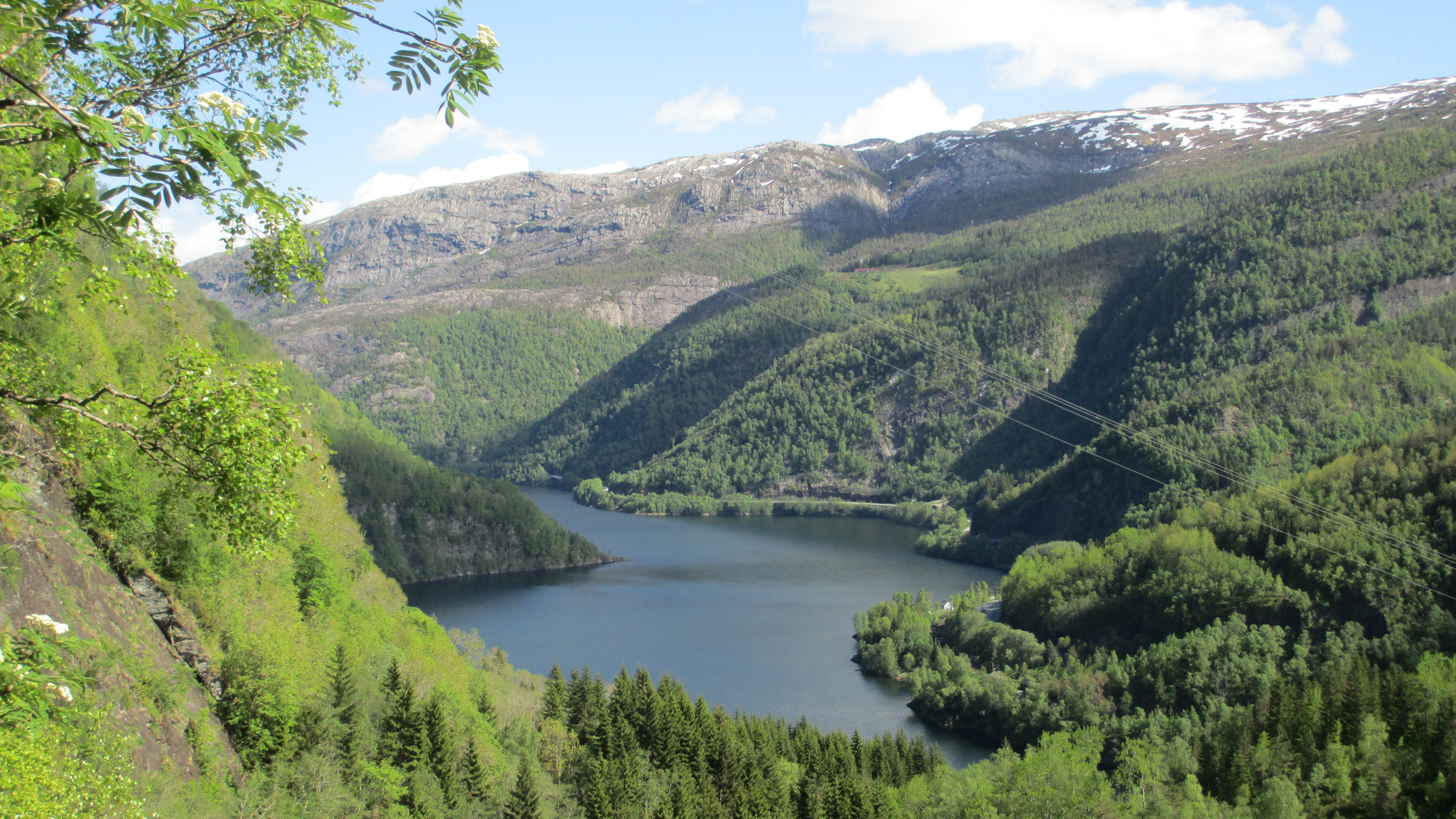
View of the surrounding area, just west of the village
