= Bolstadøyri Station =

Railway station in Voss, Norway

Bolstadøyri
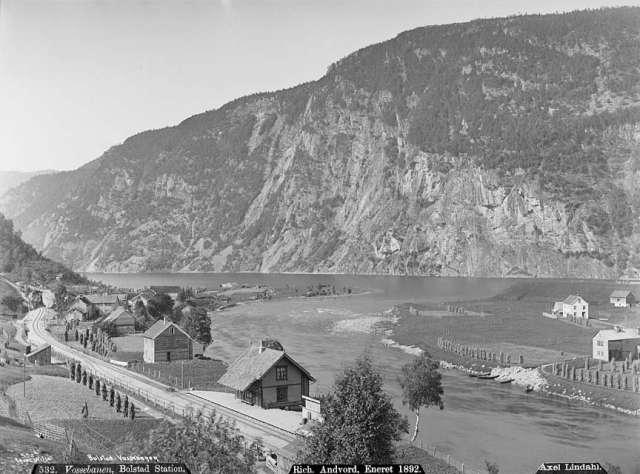
- View of the station in 1892

General information
- Location: Bolstadøyri, Voss Municipality; Norway
- Coordinates: 60.6379°N 5.9579°E
- System: Railway station
- Owner: Bane NOR
- Operator: Vy Tog
- Line: Bergensbanen
- Distance: 414.13 kilometres (257.33 mi)
- Tracks: 2

History
- Opened: 1883
Location

Bolstadøyri Station (Norwegian: Bolstadøyri stasjon) is located on Bergensbanen railway line located in the village of Bolstadøyri in Voss Municipality, Vestland county, Norway. The station is served by twelve daily departures per direction by the Bergen Commuter Rail operated by Vy Tog. The station opened in 1883 as part of Vossebanen.

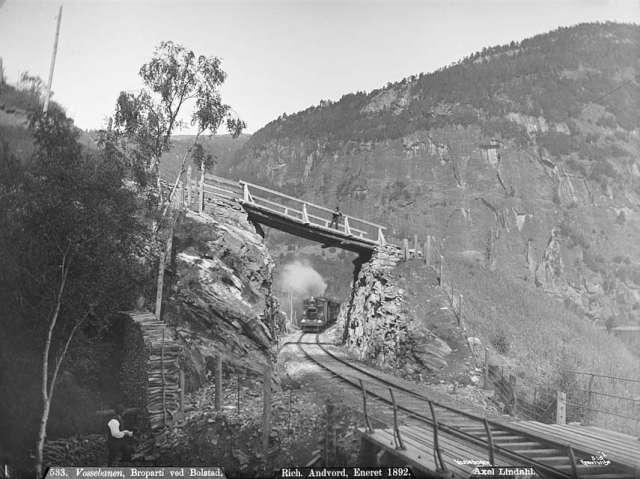
A train entering the station, 1892

Preceding station		Following station
Dale	Bergensbanen	Jørnevik
Preceding station	Local trains	Following station
Dale	Bergen Commuter Rail	Jørnevik
