= Seimsgrend Station =

Railway station in Voss, Norway

Seimsgrend
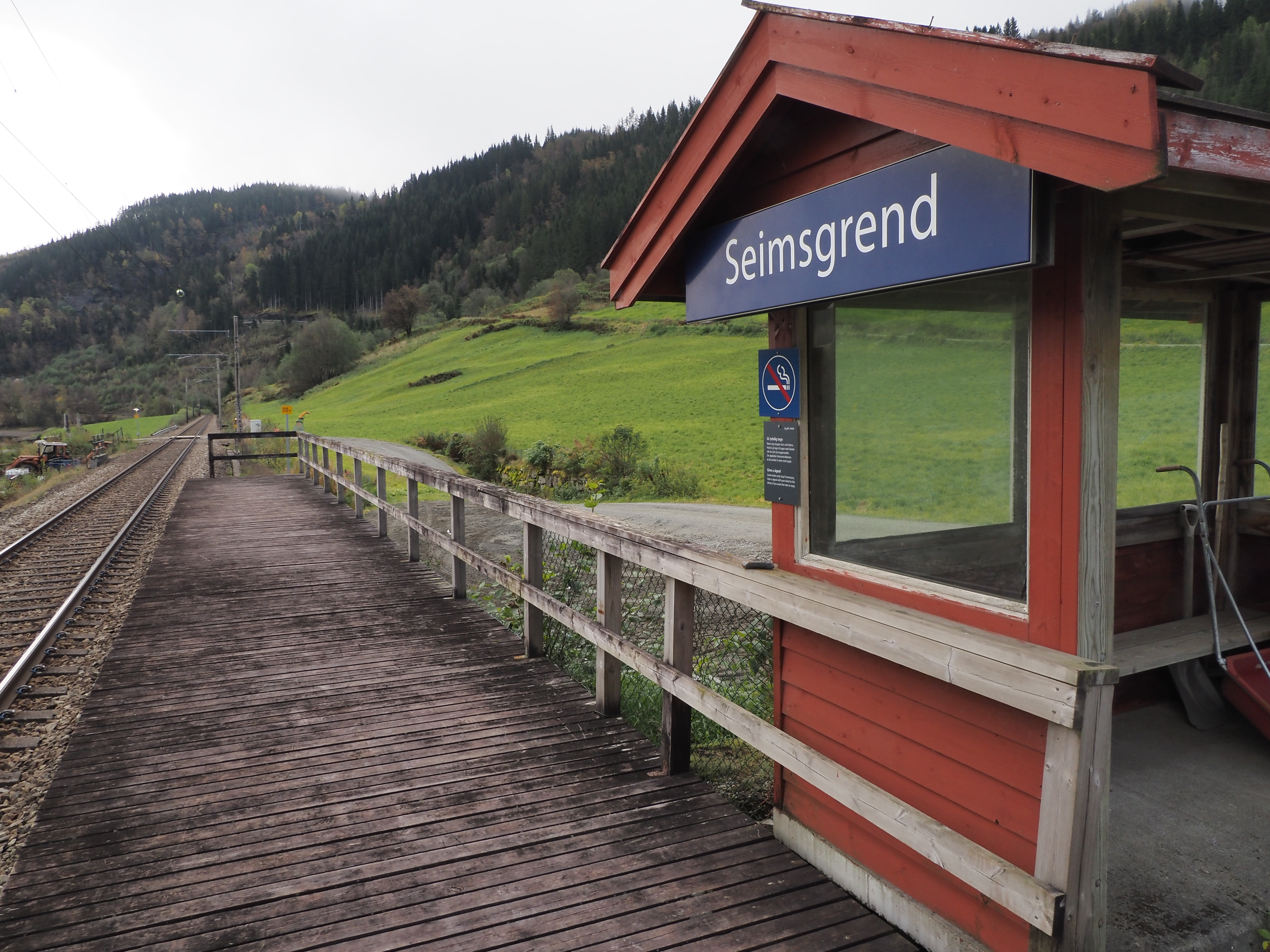

General information
- Location: Seimsgrend, Voss Municipality; Norway
- Coordinates: 60°37′55.26″N 6°14′15.11″E
- Owner: Bane NOR
- Operator: Vy Tog
- Line: Bergensbanen
- Distance: 396.16 kilometres (246.16 mi)
- Platforms: 1

History
- Opened: 1936
Location

Seimsgrend Station (Norwegian: Seimsgrend holdeplass) is a railway station on the Bergensbanen railway line. It is located at Seimsgrend in Voss Municipality, Vestland county, Norway. The station is served by limited number of departures by the Bergen Commuter Rail operated by Vy Tog. The station opened as part in 1936.

Preceding station		Following station
Evanger	Bergensbanen	Bulken
Preceding station	Local trains	Following station
Evanger	Bergen Commuter Rail	Bulken
