= Jørnevik Station =

Railway station in Voss, Norway

Jørnevik

General information
- Location: Jørneviki, Voss Municipality; Norway
- Coordinates: 60°38′46.694″N 6°0′59.306″E
- Line: Bergensbanen
- Distance: 410.24 kilometres (254.91 mi)
- Platforms: 1

History
- Opened: 1936
- Closed: 2012
Location

Jørnevik Station (Norwegian: Jørnevik stasjon) is a former railway station located on the Bergensbanen railway line. It is located at the village of Jørneviki in Voss Municipality, Vestland county, Norway. The station was served by one daily departure per direction by the Bergen Commuter Rail until its closure in 2012. There is no road connection to the station.

Preceding station		Following station
Bolstadøyri	Bergensbanen	Evanger
Preceding station	Local trains	Following station
Bolstadøyri	Bergen Commuter Rail	Evanger
