= Eviny =

Norwegian power company

Eviny AS
- Type: Private
- Industry: Power
- Founded: June 2, 1920
- Headquarters: Bergen, Norway
- Area served: Norway
- Key people: Ragnhild Janbu Fresvik (CEO); Jan Erik Kjerpeseth (Chairman)
- Revenue: ▲NOK 1,300 million (2022)
- Operating income: NOK 10,400 million (2022)
- Net income: NOK 1,700 million (2018)
- Number of employees: 1,400 (2022)
- Parent: Statkraft (43.44%); Bergen municipality (37.75%); Tysnes Kraftlag AS (1.70%); 17 other municipalities
- Website: www.eviny.no

Eviny is a Norwegian power company based in Bergen. Eviny is owned by Statkraft (43.44%), Bergen municipality (37.75%), Tysnes Kraftlag AS (1.70%) and 17 other municipalities between Sognefjorden and Hardangerfjorden. It performs production and distribution of electricity. Annual production is 7 TWh produced at 29 hydroelectric power plants.

== Operations ==
Eviny is the second largest power grid owner in Norway (after Hafslund) with close to 500,000 grid customers. The corporation also offers broadband, cable television and as well as the district heating system in Bergen. The main office is located in Bergen.

Eviny holds partial ownership in Tafjord Kraft (43.12%), Sogn og Fjordane Energi (36.84%), Sognekraft (44.44%), Bergen Fiber (62.71%), Sunnhordland Kraftlag AS (33.44%) and Enivest AS (52.51%).

The power stations operated by Eviny include Dale, Evanger, Fana, Fosse, Fossmark, Frøland, Grønsdal, Hellandfoss, Herlandsfoss, Hommelfoss, Kløvtveit, Kollsnes cogeneration plant, Kvittingen, Lundsæter, Matre, Myra, Myster, Møllefossen, Nygård, Oksebotn, Osvatn, Rådal biogas plant, Steinsland, Stend, Takle, Trengereid, Tøsse, Ulvik, Vemundsbotn, and Åsebotn.
