= Bulken Station =

Railway station in Voss, Norway

Bulken
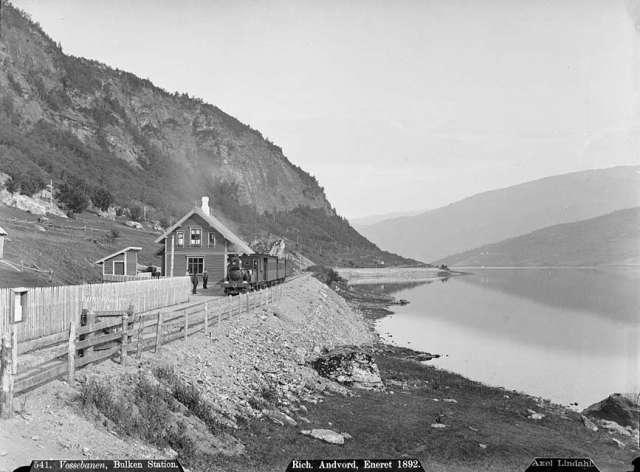
- Anno 1883-90

General information
- Location: Bulken, Voss Municipality; Norway
- Owner: Bane NOR
- Operator: Vy Tog
- Line: Bergensbanen
- Distance: 392.55 kilometres (243.92 mi)
- Platforms: 2
- Connections: 60.63059°N 6.28492°E

History
- Opened: 1883
Location

Bulken Station (Norwegian: Bulken stasjon) is a railway station on the Bergensbanen railway line located in the village of Bulken in Voss Municipality, Vestland county, Norway. The station is served by twelve daily departures in each direction by the Bergen Commuter Rail operated by Vy Tog. The station opened as part in 1883 as part of Vossebanen.

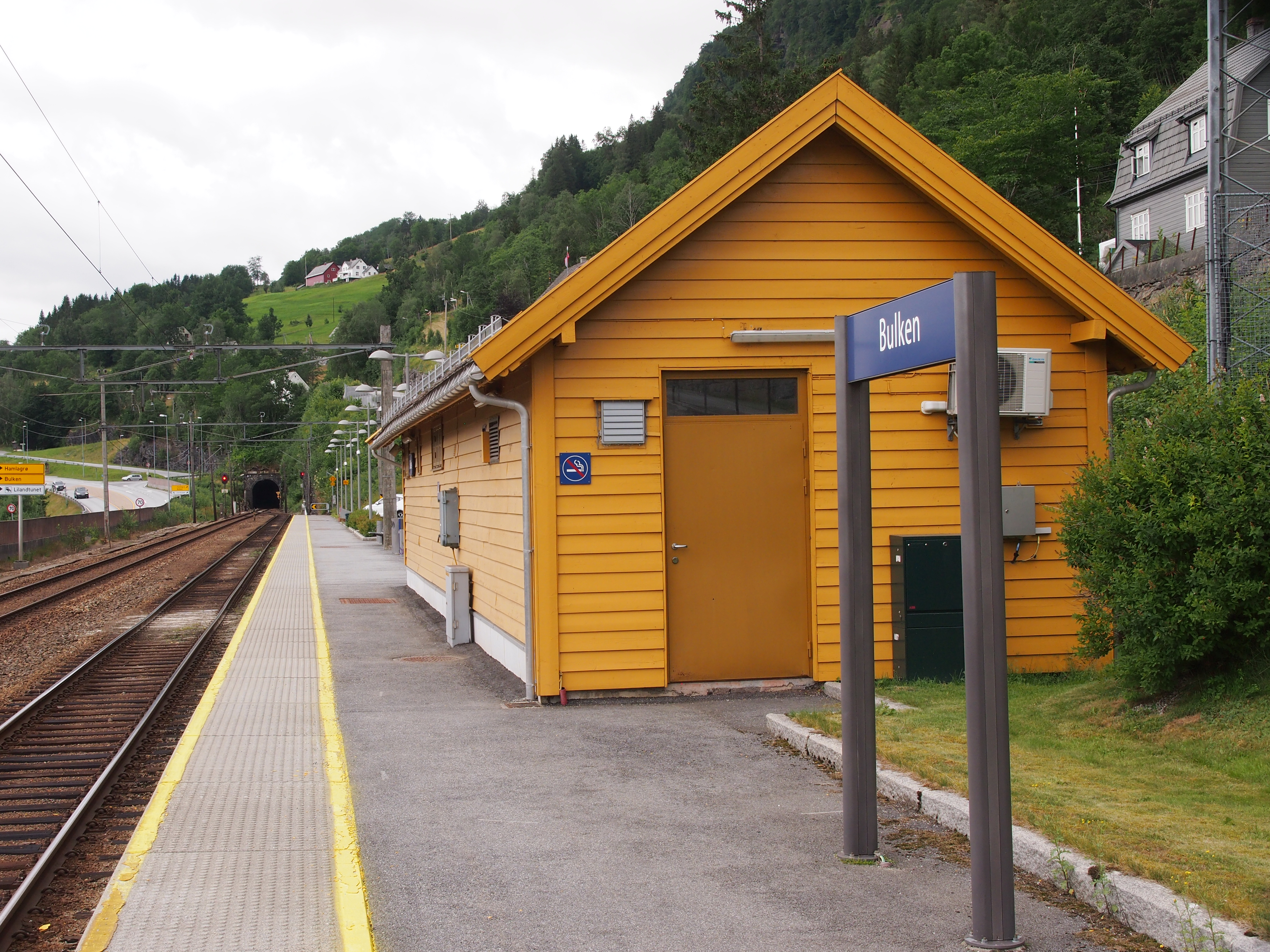
Bulken station

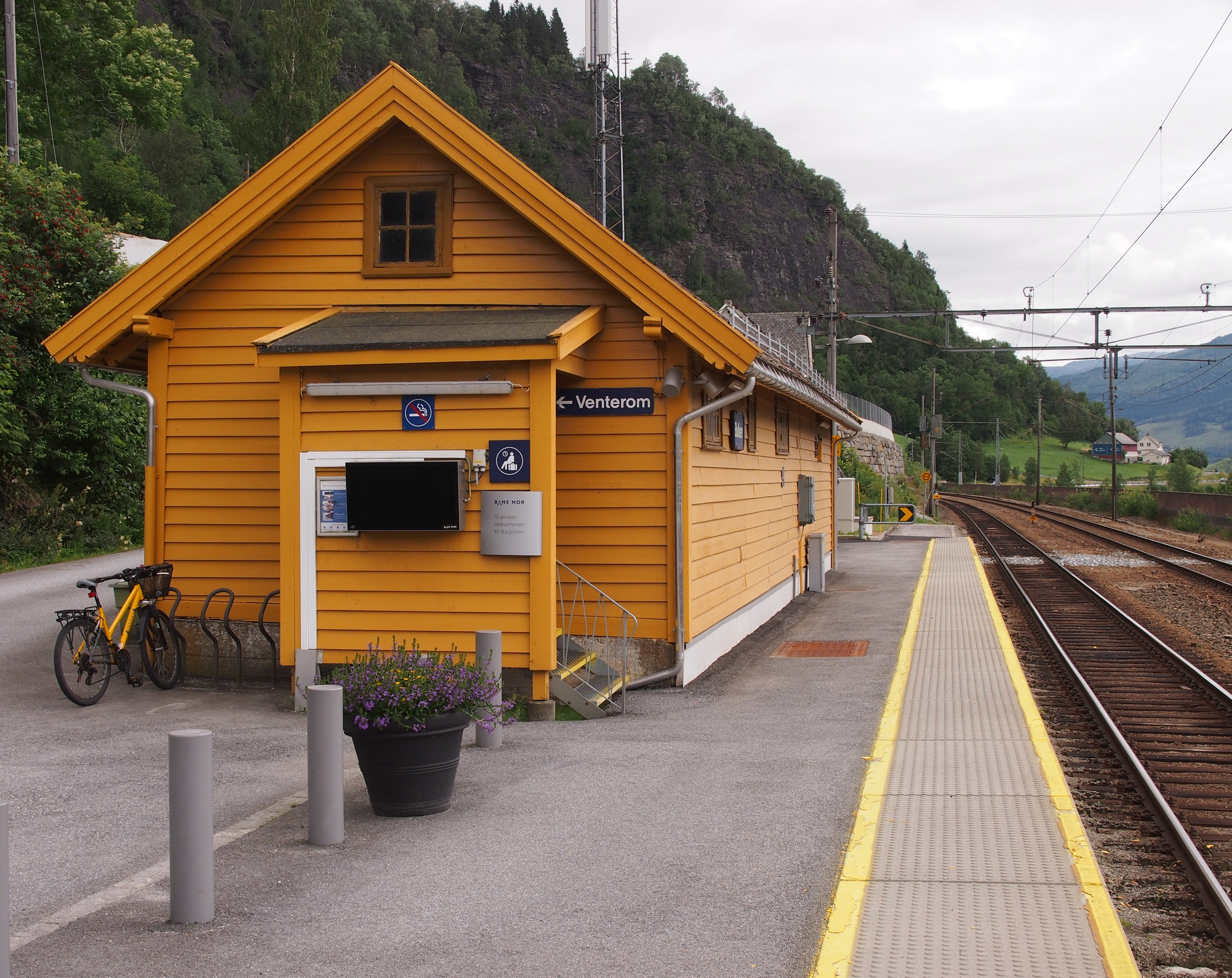
Bulken station and platform

== River surfing ==
The Bulken Wave (Bulkenbølgen) is a well known river surfing wave located in the Vosso river about 500 metres (1,600 ft) from Bulken Station. The wave can be surfed when the water has a flow rate around 125 to 150 cubic metres per second (4,400 to 5,300 cu ft/s). Average water temperature from May to July lies around 8 °C (46 °F). Surfing here has been featured in Ekstremsportveko.

Water temperature

Place	Map	Jan	Feb	Mar	Apr	May	Jun	Jul	Aug	Sep	Oct	Nov	Dec	Unit
Bulken Wave	60.6307°N 6.2772°E	2	2	2	2	4	8	11	14	12	8	5	2	°C

Preceding station		Following station
Seimsgrend	Bergensbanen	Voss
Preceding station	Local trains	Following station
Seimsgrend	Bergen Commuter Rail	Voss
