= Sognekraft =

Norwegian power company

Sognekraft AS
- Company type: Private
- Industry: Power
- Founded: 1947
- Headquarters: Vik Municipality, Norway
- Area served: Sogn og Fjordane
- Key people: Terje Bakke Nævdal (CEO); Erling Stadheim (Chairman)
- Revenue: ▲195 million kr (2006)
- Operating income: 78 million kr (2006)
- Net income: 31 million kr (2006)
- Number of employees: 24 (2026)
- Website: www.sognekraft.no

Sognekraft is a power company that operates four hydroelectric power stations as well as the power grid in Sogndal Municipality and Vik Municipality in Vestland county, Norway. The company was established in 1947. Annual average production is 600 gigawatt-hours (2,200 TJ).

The company is owned by Eviny power company (44.4%), Luster Energiverk power company (12.9%), Vik Municipality (19.8%), Sogndal Municipality (16%), and Luster Municipality (6.9%).
