= Evanger Church =

Church in Vestland, Norway

- Evanger kyrkje
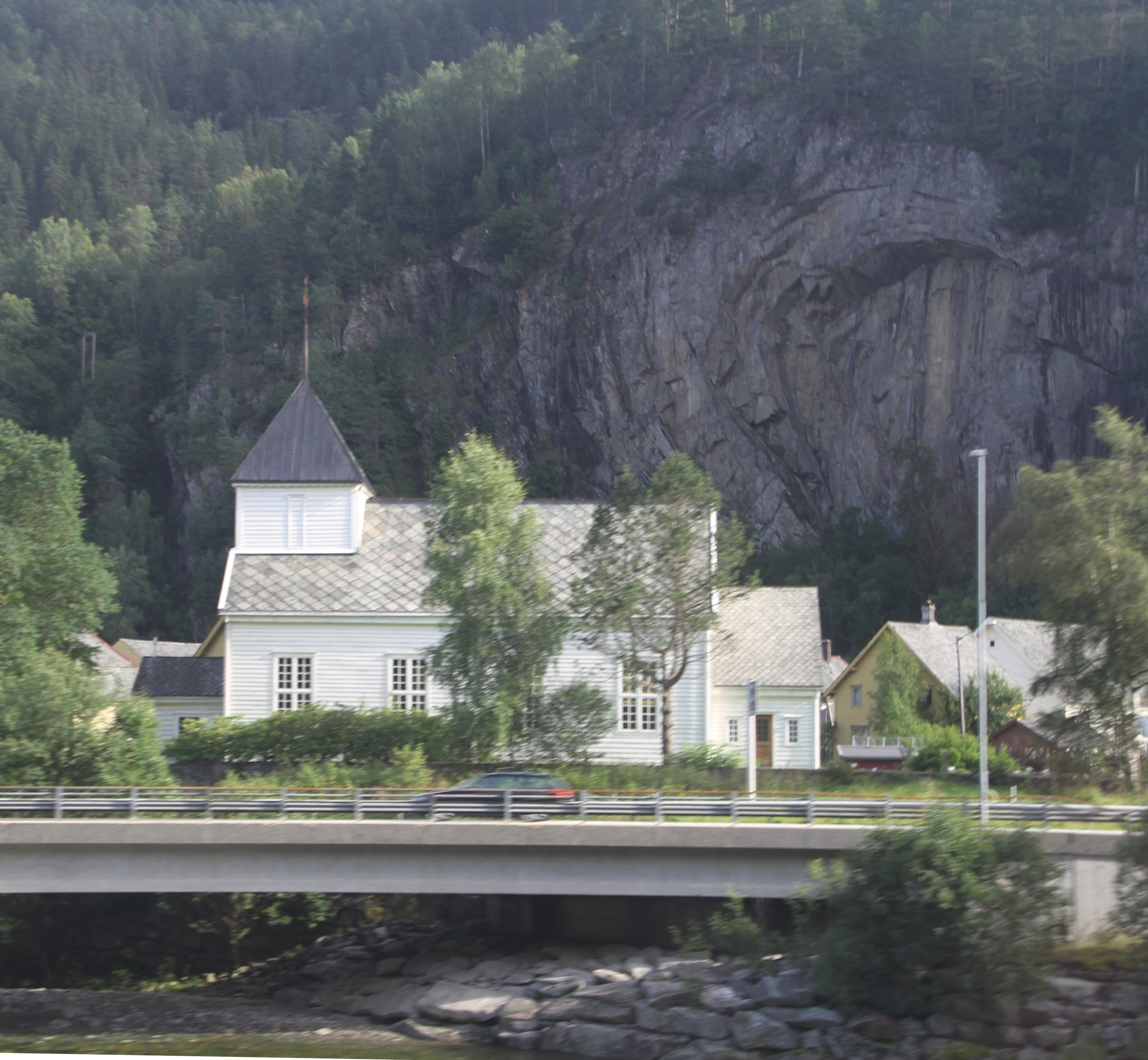
- View of the church
- Evanger Church
- 60°38′50″N 6°06′54″E
- Location: Voss, Vestland
- Country: Norway
- Denomination: Church of Norway
- Previous denomination: Catholic Church
- Churchmanship: Evangelical Lutheran

History
- Status: Parish church
- Founded: 13th century
- Consecrated: 1851

Architecture
- Functional status: Active
- Architect: Hans Linstow
- Architectural type: Long church
- Style: Empire style
- Completed: 1851 (175 years ago)

Specifications
- Capacity: 250
- Materials: Wood

Administration
- Diocese: Bjørgvin bispedømme
- Deanery: Hardanger og Voss prosti
- Parish: Evanger og Bolstad
- Norwegian Cultural Heritage Site
- Type: Church
- Status: Listed
- ID: 84105

Evanger Church (Norwegian: Evanger kyrkje) is a parish church of the Church of Norway in Voss Municipality in Vestland county, Norway. It is located in the village of Evanger. It is the church for the Evanger og Bolstad parish which is part of the Hardanger og Voss prosti (deanery) in the Diocese of Bjørgvin. The white, wooden church was built in a long church design in 1851 using plans drawn up by the architect Hans Linstow. The church seats about 250 people.

== History ==
There has been a church at Evanger since the Middle Ages. It was first recorded in historical records in 1315, but the church was not built that year. The first church was a wooden stave church that was likely built during the 13th century. The old church was torn down in the 1600s and replaced by a new timber-framed long church on the same site. It had a rectangular 11 by 8 metres (36 ft × 26 ft) nave and a square 6.8 by 6.8 metres (22 ft × 22 ft) choir with a tower on the west end. In 1673, a new tower was constructed. During the late-1600s, church records show a flurry of construction activity including a new roof, ceiling, and second floor seating gallery in addition to new interior and exterior painting. In 1702–1704, the old tower was torn down and a brand new tower built in its place. The church had a 11.3-by-8.2-metre (37 ft × 27 ft) nave with a 7-by-7-metre (23 ft × 23 ft) choir on the east end. Johan Christian Dahl included Evanger Church in one of his paintings in 1831 (the only known image of that church that is still in existence, however, the image does not really match written descriptions of the building).

In 1851, the old church was torn down and replaced with a new church on the same site, reusing one of the foundation walls from the previous church. This new church was built using designs drawn by Hans Linstow and the lead builder was Ole Syslak. The nave measures about 12.6 by 9.7 metres (41 ft × 32 ft) and the choir on the east end measures about 5.7 by 9.7 metres (19 ft × 32 ft). A small sacristy is located to the east of the choir. The church is decorated in the Empire style. During the 1950s, the church porch was rebuilt and enlarged.

== Media gallery ==
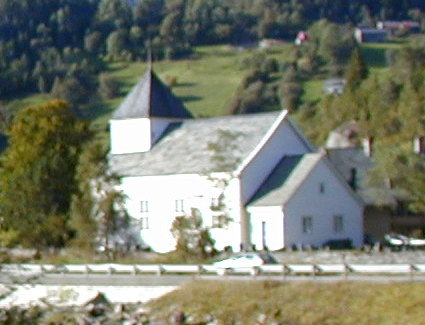

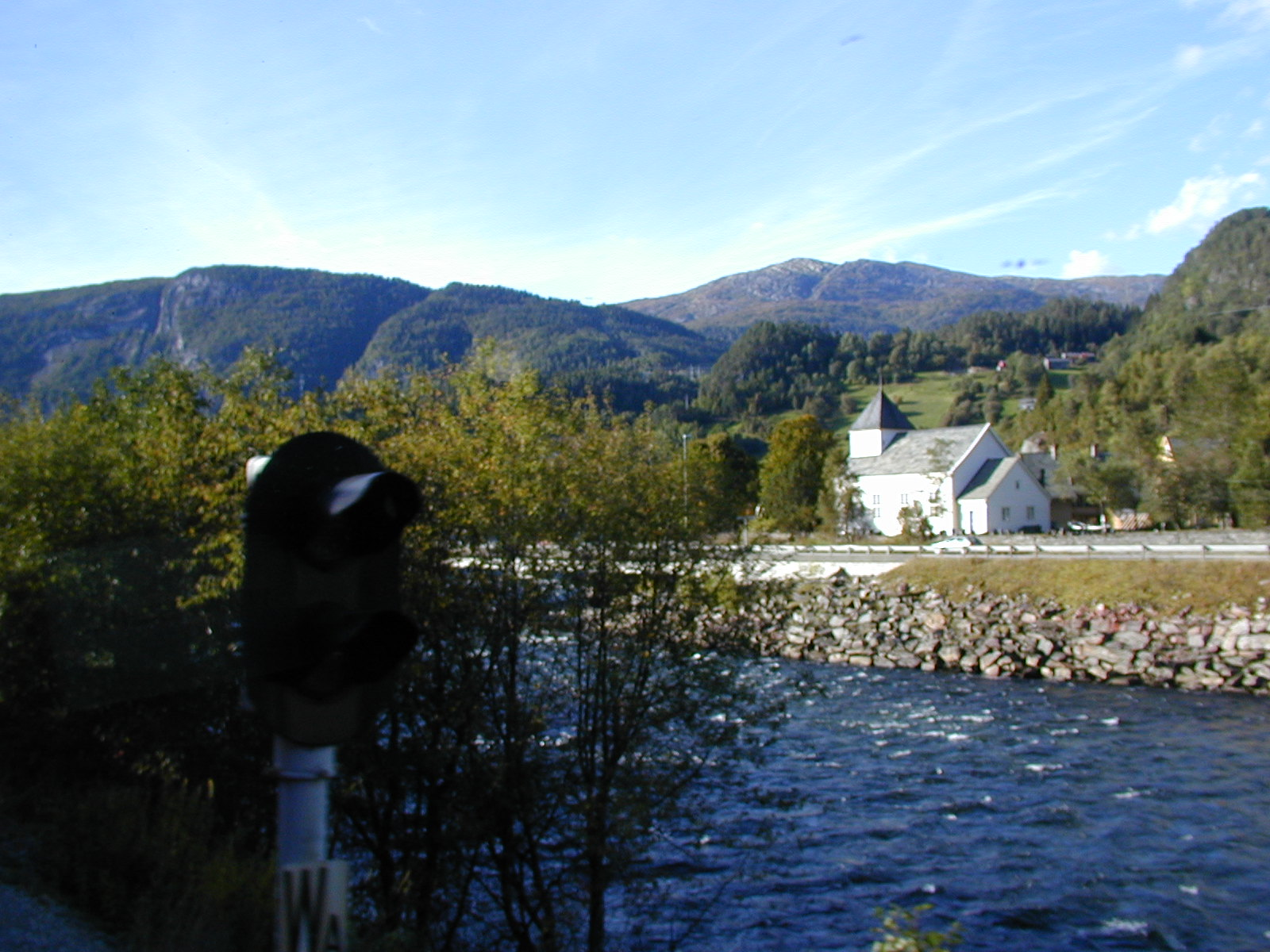

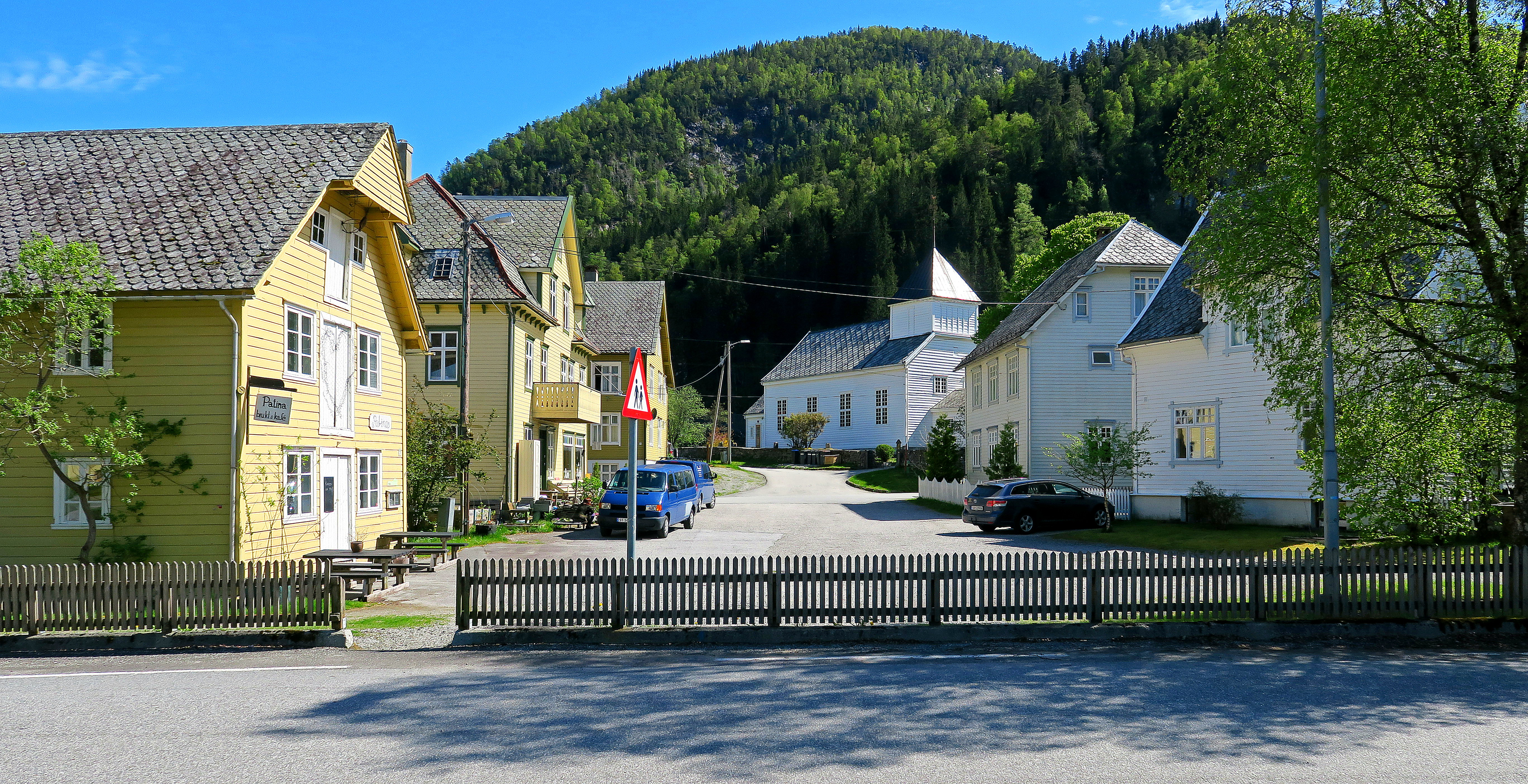

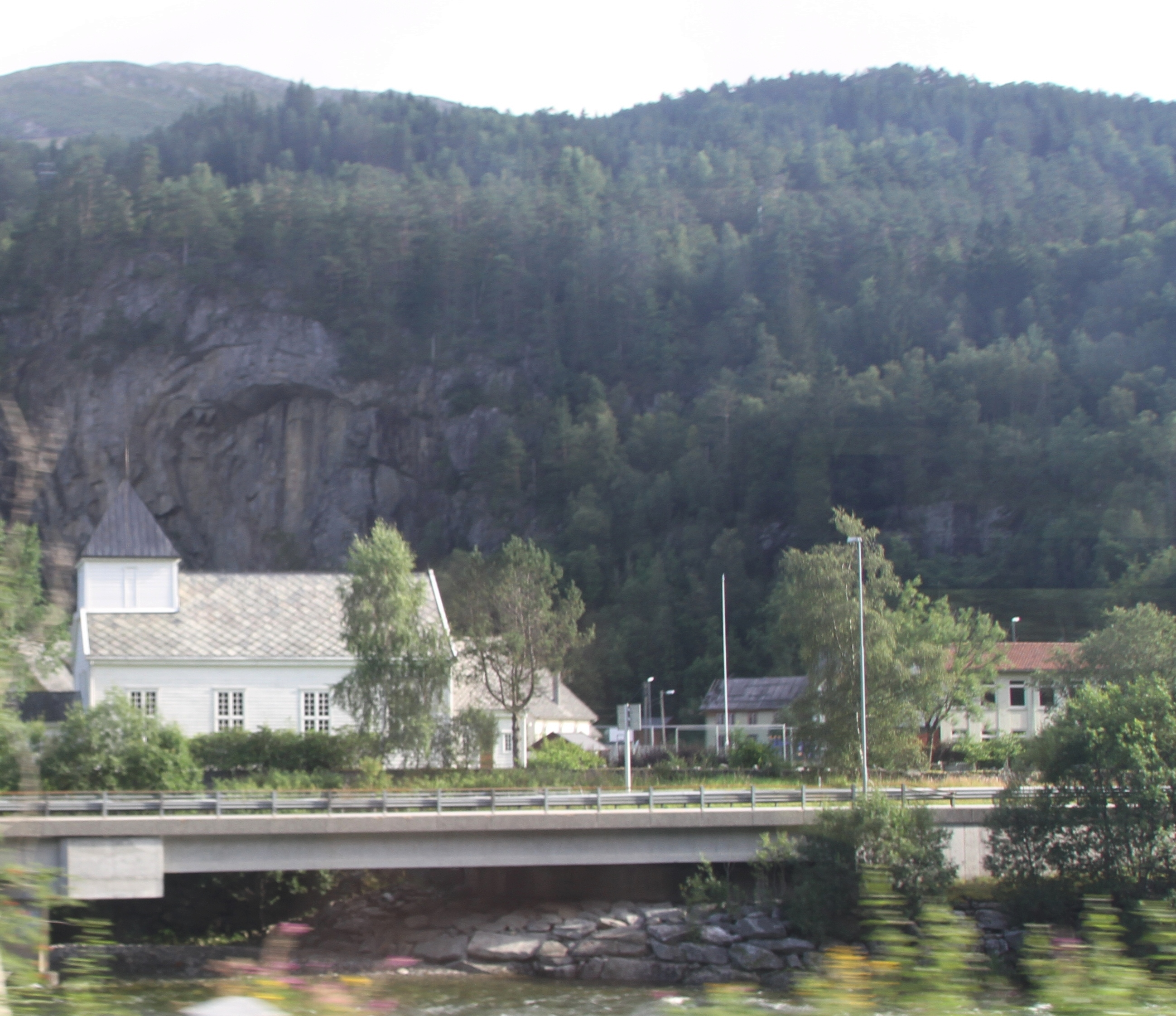

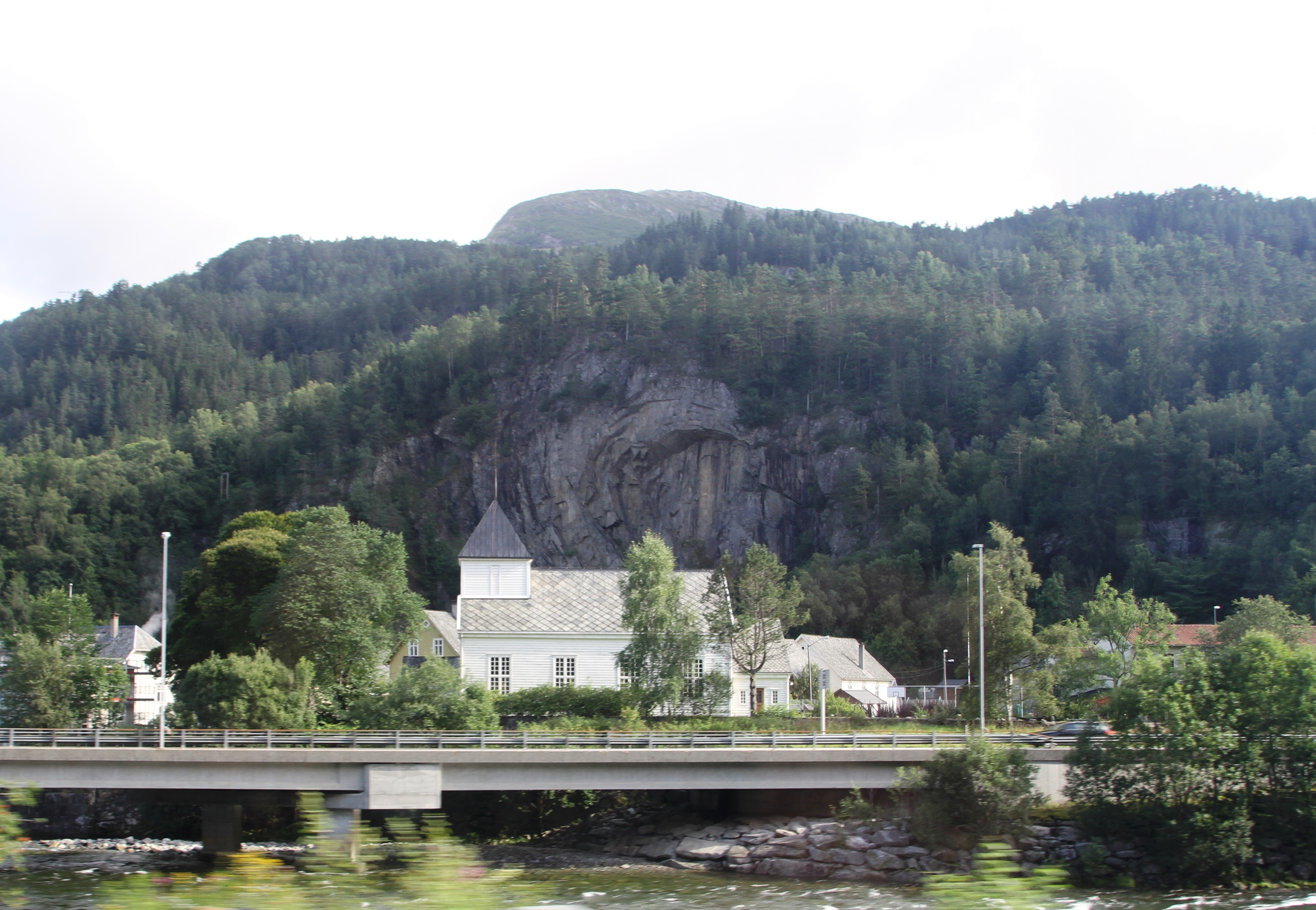

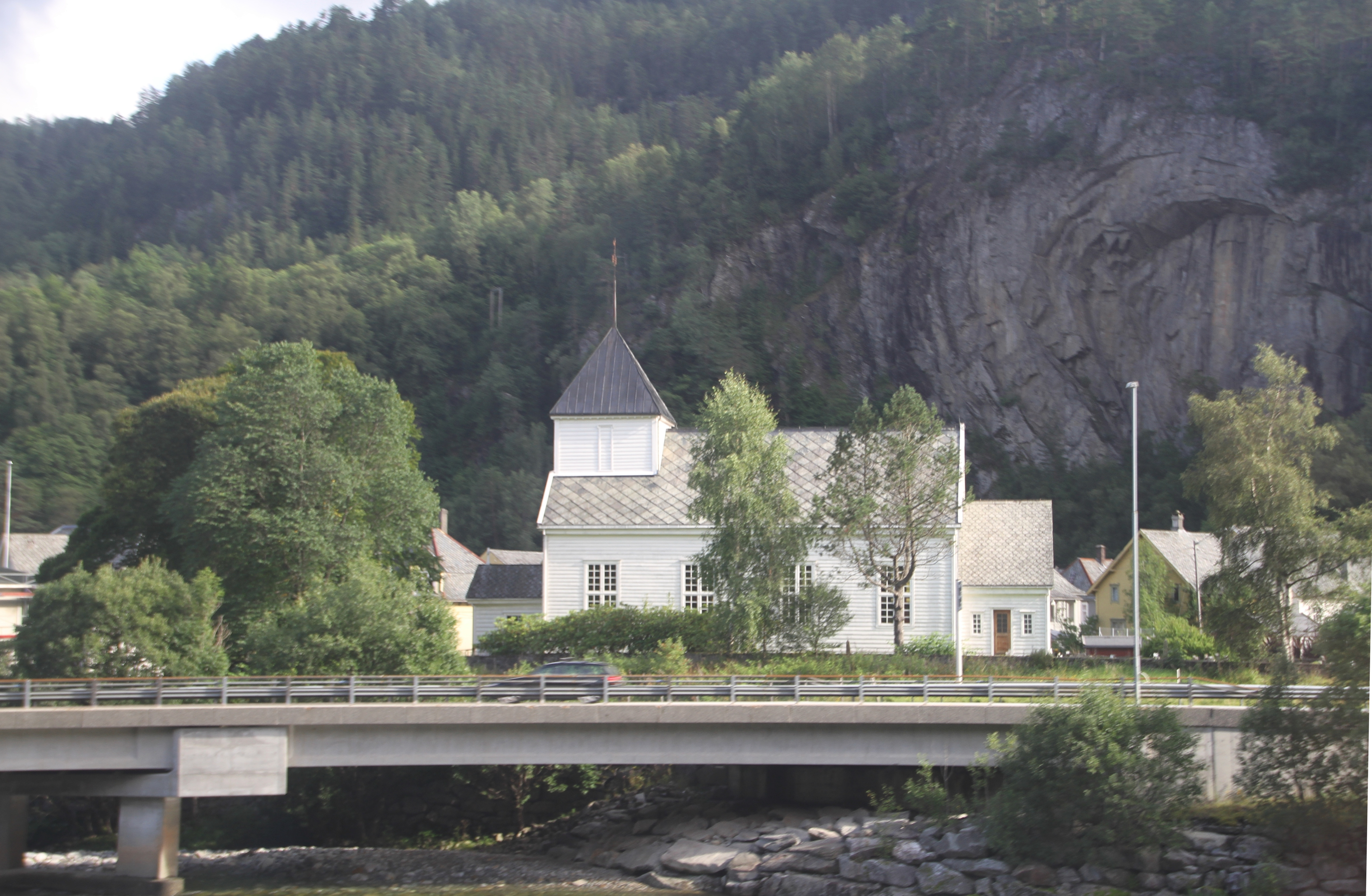

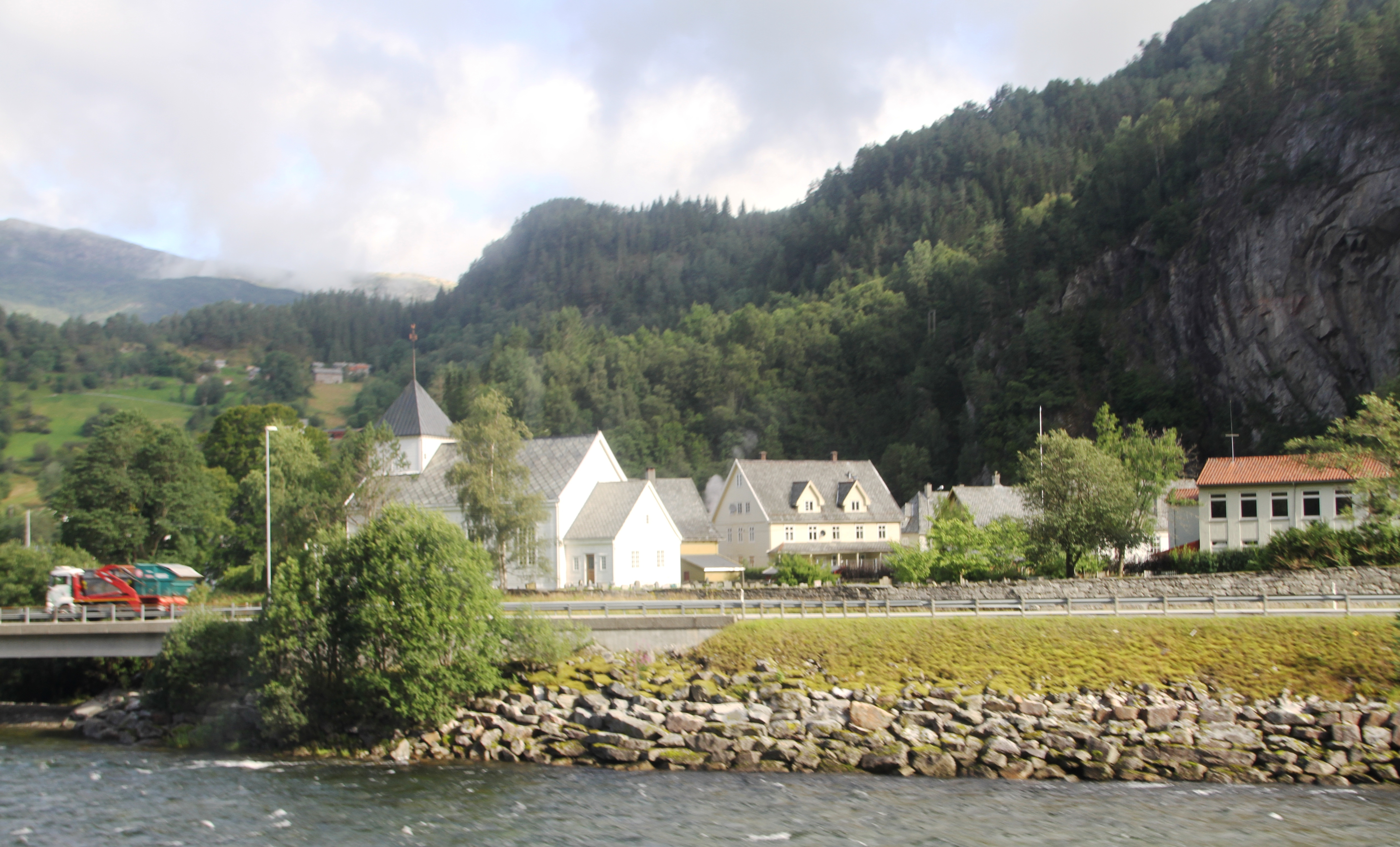

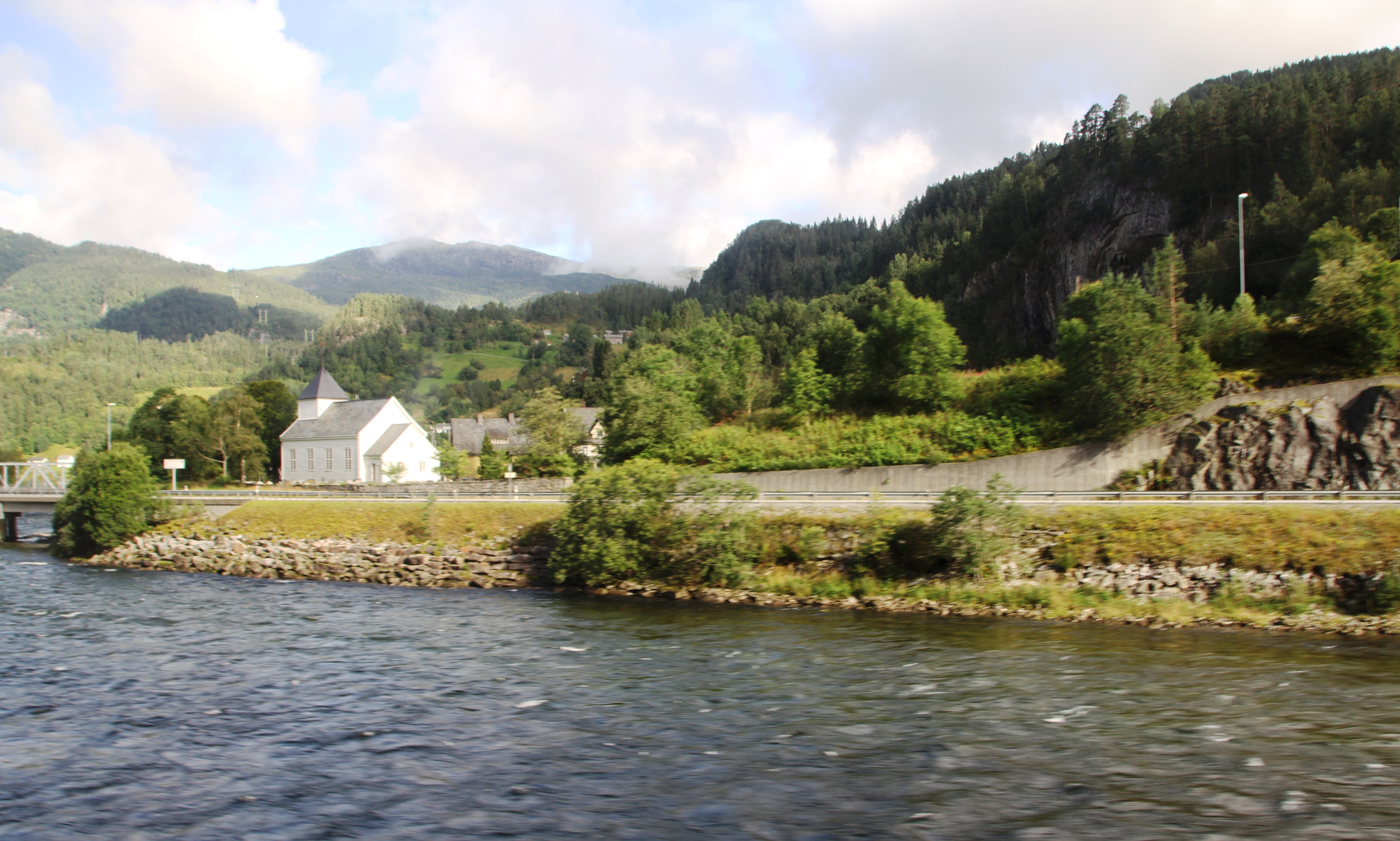

== See also ==
- List of churches in Bjørgvin
