= Evanger Station =

Railway station in Voss, Norway

Coordinates: 60°38′49.27″N 6°6′33.64″E

Evanger
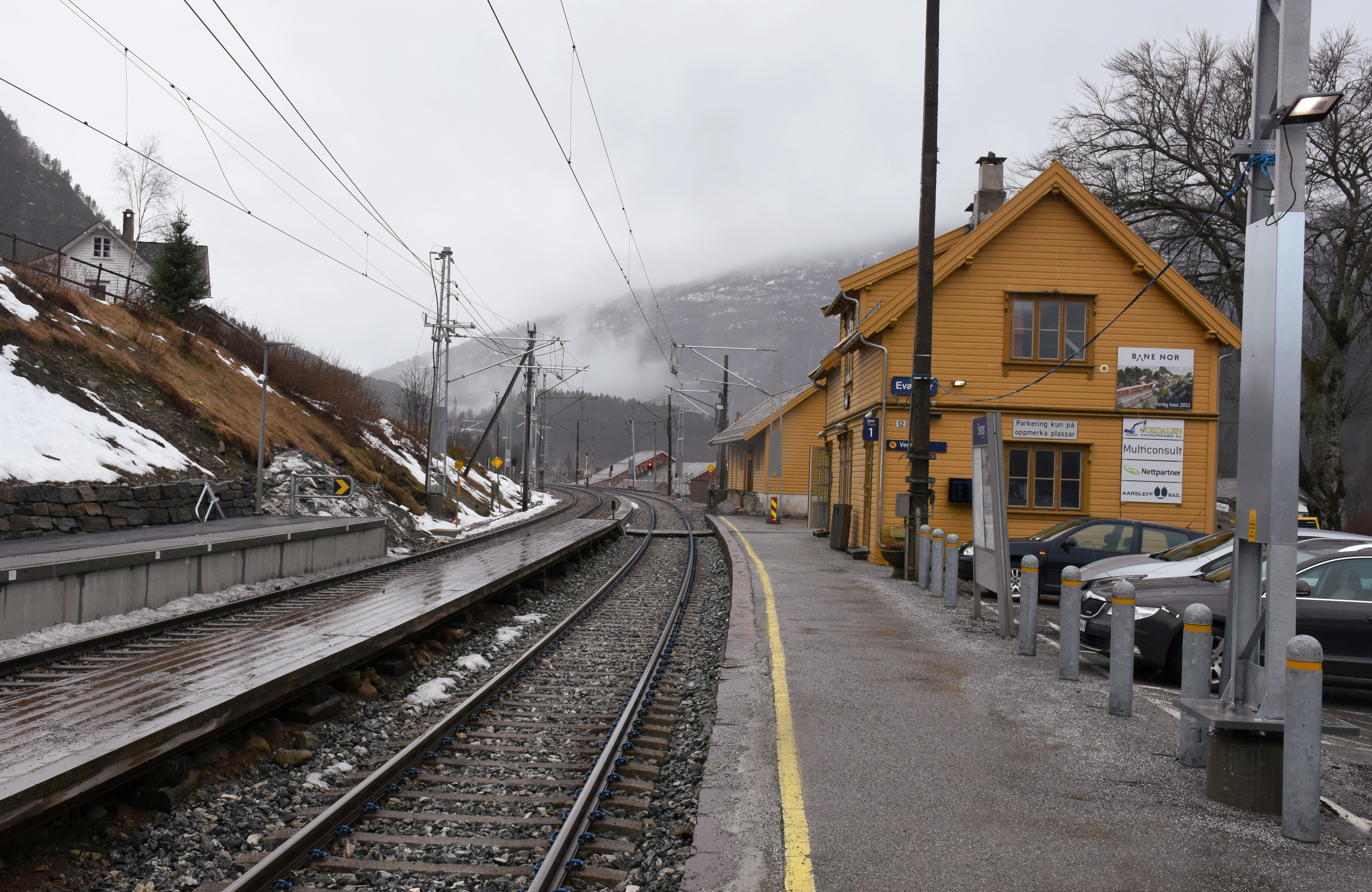

General information
- Location: Evanger, Voss Municipality; Norway
- Elevation: 15.5 metres (51 ft)
- Owner: Bane NOR
- Operator: Vy Tog
- Line: Bergensbanen
- Distance: 403.66 kilometres (250.82 mi)
- Platforms: 2

History
- Opened: 1883
Location

Evanger Station (Norwegian: Evanger stasjon) is a railway station located on the Bergensbanen railway line in the village of Evanger in Voss Municipality in Vestland county, Norway. The station is served by twelve daily departures per direction by the Bergen Commuter Rail operated by Vy Tog. The station opened as part of Vossebanen in 1883.

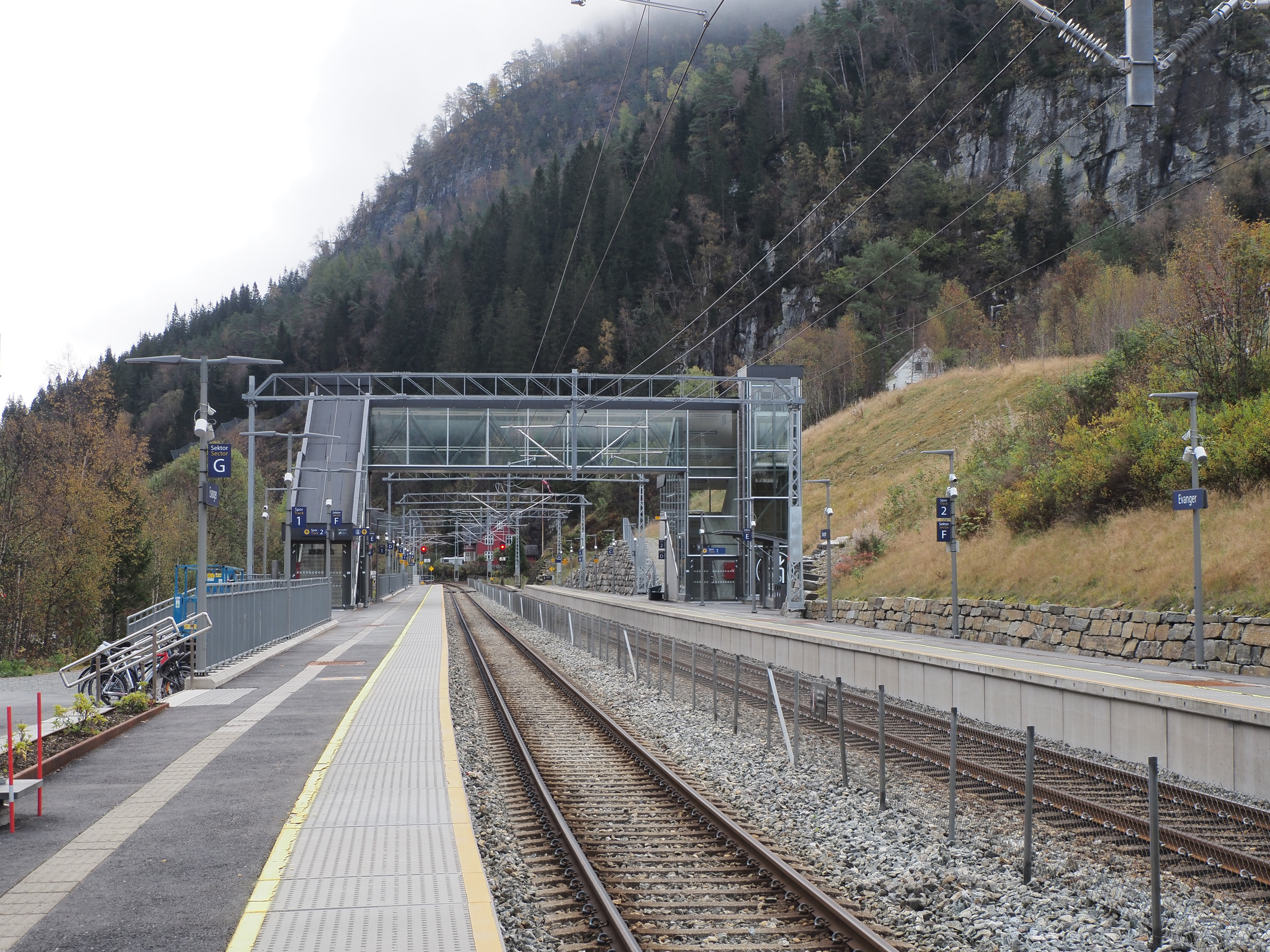
Evanger station, new platform and crossing bridge

Preceding station		Following station
Jørnevik	Bergensbanen	Seimsgrend
Preceding station	Local trains	Following station
Jørnevik	Bergen Commuter Rail	Seimsgrend
