= Evanger Hydroelectric Power Station =

Hydroelectric power station in Voss, Vestland, Norway

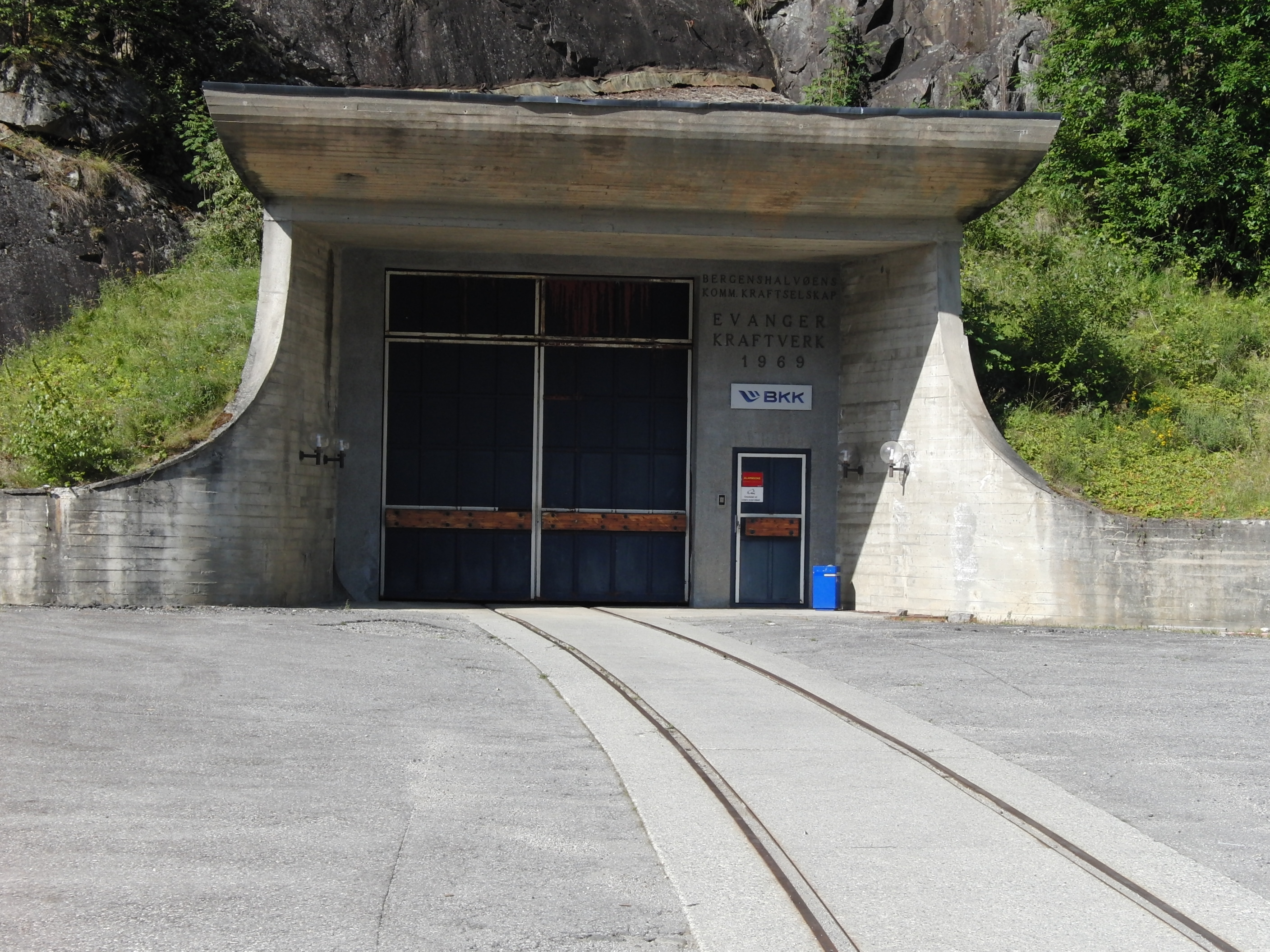
- Official name: Evanger kraftverk
- Country: Norway
- Location: Voss Municipality
- Coordinates: 60°39′22″N 6°06′42″E
- Status: Operational
- Commission date: 1969
- Owner: Eviny Fornybar
- Operator: Eviny Fornybar

Tidal power station
- Tidal range: 770 m (2,530 ft)

Power generation
- Units planned: 3 × 110 MW
- Nameplate capacity: 330 MW
- Capacity factor: 49.6%
- Annual net output: 1,435 GW·h

The Evanger Power Station is a hydroelectric power station located in Voss Municipality in Vestland county, Norway. The facility operates at an installed capacity of 330 megawatts (440,000 hp). The average annual production is 1,435 gigawatt-hours (5,170 TJ).
