= Stryn =

Stryn may refer to:

== Places ==
- Stryn Municipality, a municipality in Vestland county, Norway
- Stryn (village), a village within Stryn Municipality in Vestland county, Norway
- Stryn river, or Stryneelva, a river in Stryn Municipality in Vestland county, Norway

== Sports ==
- Stryn Sommerski, a skiing facility in Stryn Municipality in Vestland county, Norway
- Stryn TIL, a sports club based in Stryn Municipality in Vestland county, Norway
