= Hopland =

Hopland may refer to:

== Places ==
- Hopland, California, a place in Mendocino county, California, United States
- Old Hopland, California, a place in Mendocino county, California, United States
- Hopland, Austrheim, a village in Austrheim Municipality in Vestland county, Norway
- Hopland, Stryn, a village in Stryn Municipality in Vestland county, Norway
