= Oldedalen =

River valley in Western Norway

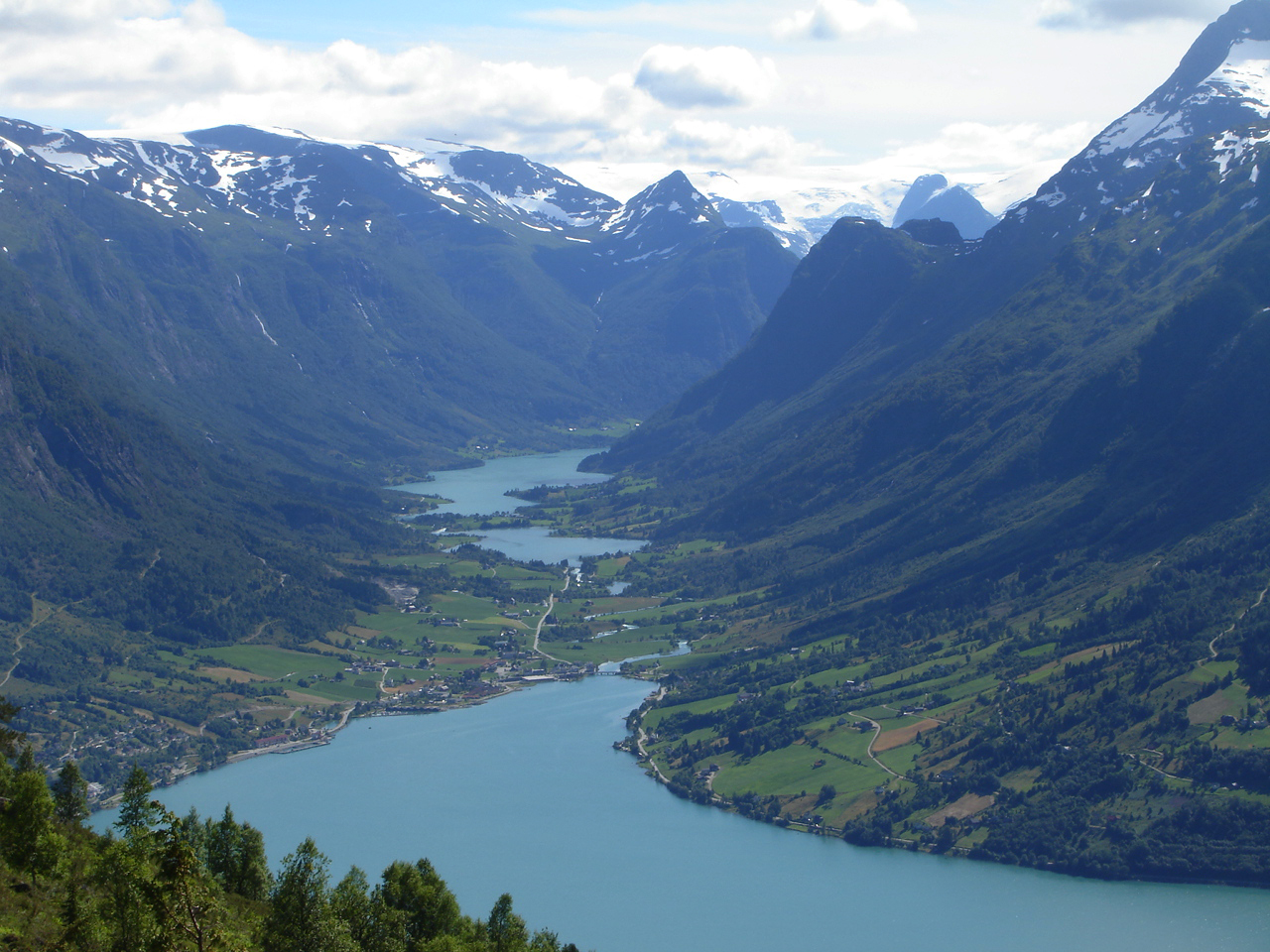
- View of the valley
- Length: 20 kilometres (12 mi) North-South
- Width: 2 kilometres (1.2 mi)

Geology
- Type: River valley

Geography
- Location: Vestland, Norway
- Coordinates: 61.69107°N 6.81695°E

Location
- Interactive map of the valley

Oldedalen is a river valley in Stryn Municipality in Vestland county, Norway. The 20-kilometre (12 mi) long valley runs north-south and ends at the Nordfjorden at the village of Olden. The south end of the valley reaches up to the great Jostedalsbreen glacier inside Jostedalsbreen National Park. The small Briksdalsbreen is a smaller arm that branches off the main Jostedalsbreen glacier, and it sits at the end of the Oldedalen valley. It is a tourist attraction due to its easy to reach location. The western side of the valley is a fairly steep wall of mountains with the Myklebustbreen glacier at the top.

The lake Oldevatnet lies in the center of the valley for most of its length. At the north end of the valley, the lake empties into the river Oldeelva, which flows into the Nordfjorden. Both the Olden Church and the historic Old Olden Church are located near the north end of the valley; the Ljosheim Chapel lies at the valley's southern end.
