= Utvik =

Village in Stryn Municipality, Norway

- Village
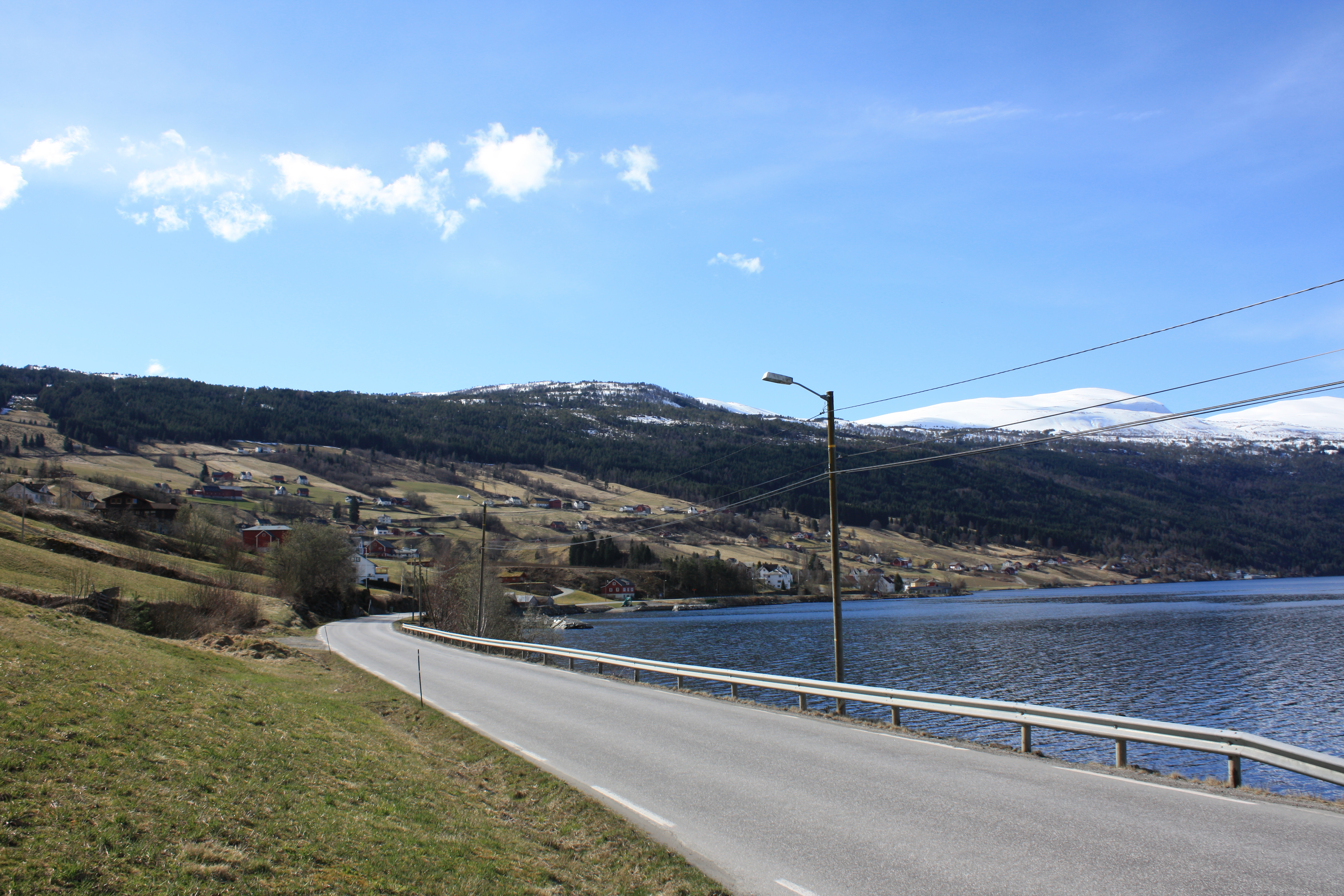
- View of the village
- Interactive map of Utvik
- Location within Vestland Location within Norway
- Coordinates: 61.8064°N 6.5192°E
- Country: Norway
- Region: Western Norway
- County: Vestland
- District: Nordfjord
- Municipality: Stryn Municipality
- Elevation: 21 m (69 ft)
- Time zone: UTC+01:00 (CET)
  - Summer (DST): UTC+02:00 (CEST)
- Post Code: 6797 Utvik

Utvik is a village in Stryn Municipality in Vestland county, Norway. The village is located on the southern shore of the Nordfjorden. The village lies about 7 kilometres (4.3 mi) southwest of the village of Innvik and about 10 kilometres (6.2 mi) north of the village of Byrkjelo (in Gloppen Municipality). Utvik Church is located in this village. Historically, the village was an important trading post and ferry port with a regular route across the fjord. The ferry was stopped in 1936 when the new road was completed along the Nordfjorden connecting Utvik to the village of Stryn.
