= Innvik (village) =

Village in Stryn Municipality, Norway

- Village
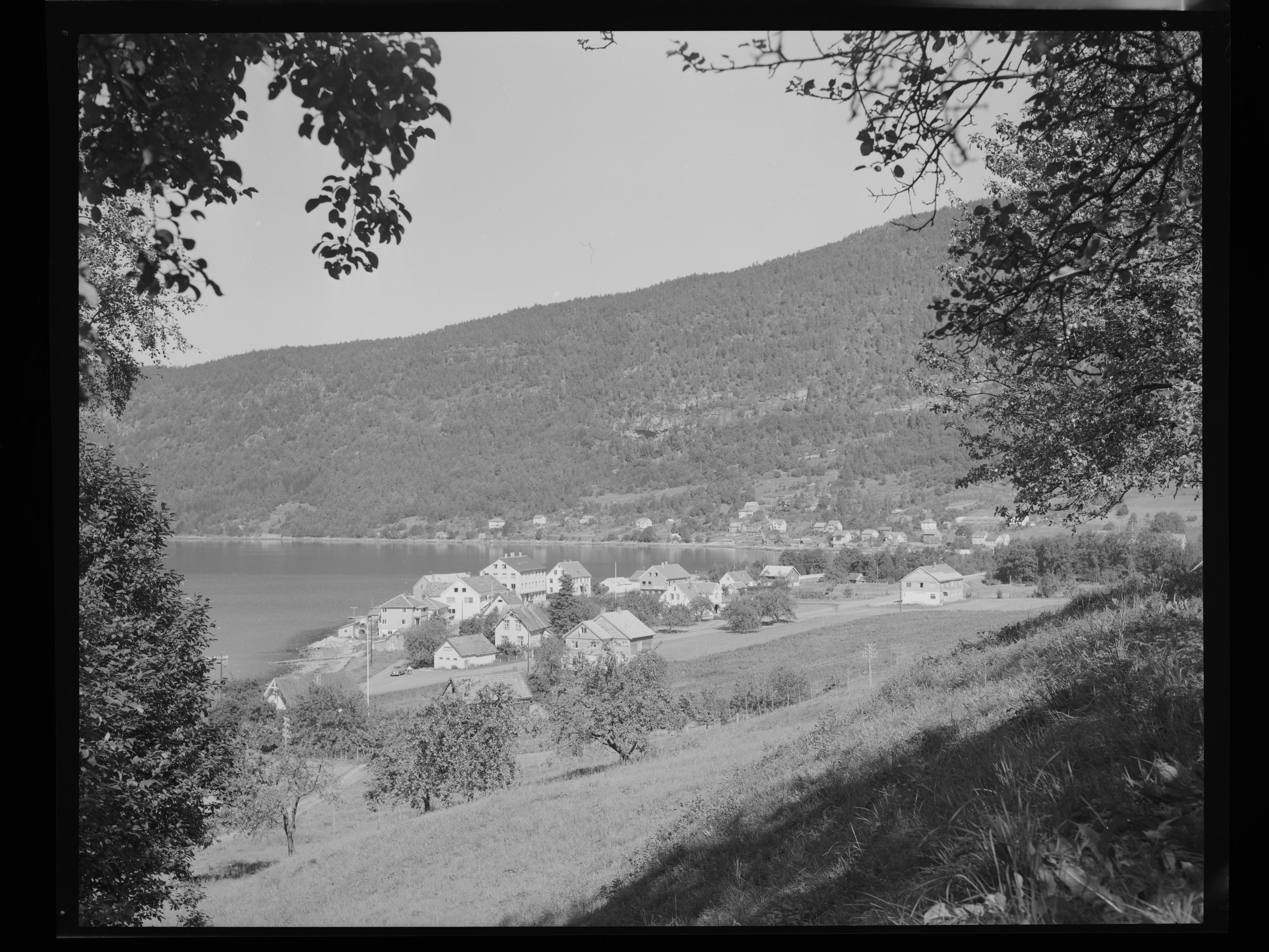
- View of the village
- Interactive map of Innvik
- Location within Vestland Location within Norway
- Coordinates: 61.8523°N 6.6151°E
- Country: Norway
- Region: Western Norway
- County: Vestland
- District: Nordfjord
- Municipality: Stryn Municipality

Area
  - Total: 0.72 km^{2} (0.28 sq mi)
- Elevation: 37 m (121 ft)

Population (2024)
  - Total: 419
  - Density: 582/km^{2} (1,510/sq mi)
- Time zone: UTC+01:00 (CET)
  - Summer (DST): UTC+02:00 (CEST)
- Post Code: 6793 Innvik

Innvik is a village in Stryn Municipality in Vestland county, Norway. The village is located on the southern shore of the Nordfjorden. The village is located about 15 kilometres (9.3 mi) west of the village of Olden and about 7 kilometres (4.3 mi) northeast of the village of Utvik. Directly across the fjord from Innvik lies the village of Roset.

The 0.72-square-kilometre (180-acre) village has a population (2024) of 419 and a population density of 582 inhabitants per square kilometre (1,510/sq mi).

== History ==
The village was the administrative centre of the old Innvik Municipality which existed from 1838 until 1965. Innvik Church is located in the village.

=== Name ===
The name comes from the old Innvik farm (Old Norse: Víkr), since Innvik Church is located there. The old name is identical with the word vík which means "inlet". Over time, the prefix inn- (meaning "inner") was added to distinguish the area from nearby Utvik (meaning "outer" Vik). The name Indviken or the more modern spelling Innvik has been in use since the 15th century.
