= Nordsida Church =

Church in Vestland, Norway

- Nordsida kyrkje
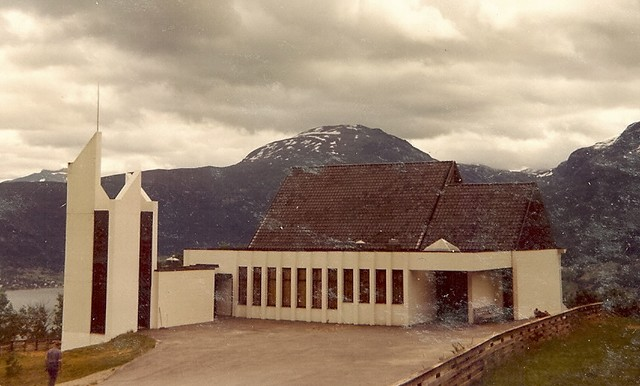
- View of the church
- Nordsida Church
- 61°51′05″N 6°31′14″E
- Location: Stryn Municipality, Vestland
- Country: Norway
- Denomination: Church of Norway
- Churchmanship: Evangelical Lutheran

History
- Status: Parish church
- Founded: 1973
- Consecrated: 9 December 1973

Architecture
- Functional status: Active
- Architect: Alf Apalseth
- Architectural type: Long church
- Completed: 1973 (53 years ago)

Specifications
- Capacity: 220
- Materials: Concrete

Administration
- Diocese: Bjørgvin bispedømme
- Deanery: Nordfjord prosti
- Parish: Nordsida
- Norwegian Cultural Heritage Site
- Type: Church
- Status: Not protected
- ID: 85166

Nordsida Church (Norwegian: Nordsida kyrkje) is a parish church of the Church of Norway in Stryn Municipality in Vestland county, Norway. It is located in the village of Roset, on the northern shore of the Nordfjorden. It is the church for the Nordsida parish which is part of the Nordfjord prosti (deanery) in the Diocese of Bjørgvin. The white, concrete church was built in a long church design in 1973 using plans drawn up by the architect Alf Apalseth. The church seats about 220 people.

== History ==
During the 1920s, the people on the north side of the Innvik Church parish began asking for their own church on their side of the fjord. Strife and negotiations of this idea carried on for decades. After World War II, political changes ensued in the local municipalities. In 1965, the old Hornindal Municipality was divided and a large portion of it was added to Stryn Municipality. After some negotiations, approval for the new Nordsida Chapel was given. The new chapel would be an annex chapel under Hornindal Church. The architect Alf Apalseth from Ørsta Municipality made the architectural drawings for the new church building and Kjell Sigmar Slinning designed the interior of the church. The church was completed in 1973. The building was consecrated on 9 December 1973 by the Bishop Per Juvkam. In 1977, the part of Stryn Municipality that used to be Hornindal Municipality was separated from Stryn Municipality again. On 1 July 1981, Nordsida Chapel was renamed as a church and it became a full parish church.

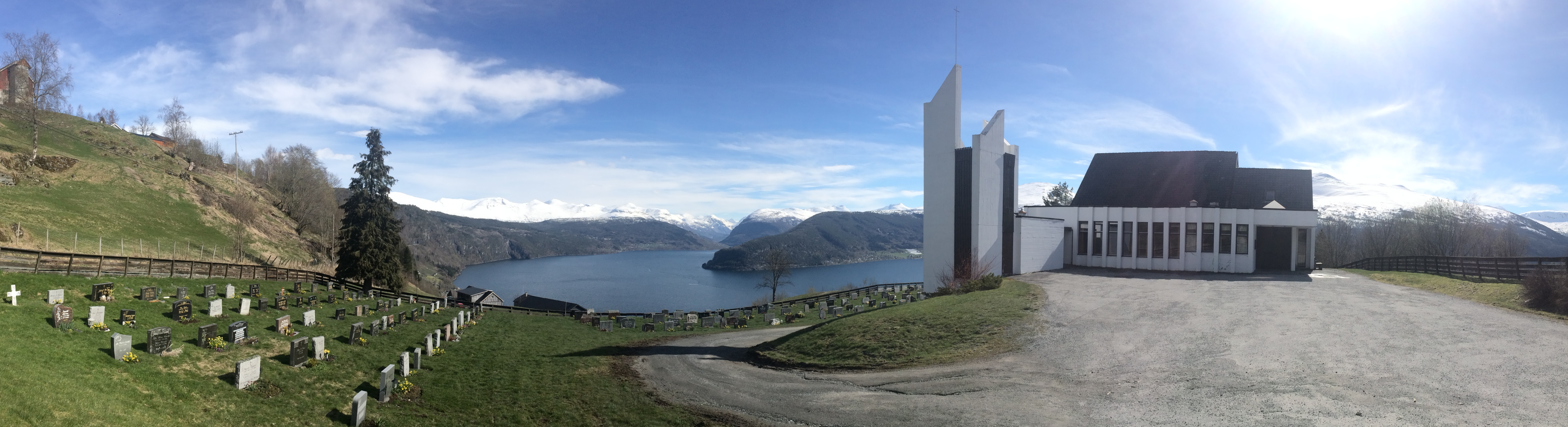

== See also ==
- List of churches in Bjørgvin
