= Briksdalsbreen =

Glacier in Vestland, Norway

- View of the glacier in September 2026
- Interactive map of Briksdalsbreen
- Type: Mountain glacier
- Location: Vestland, Norway
- Coordinates: 61°39′57″N 06°53′24″E
- Area: 10.4 km^{2} (4.0 sq mi)
- Length: 2.5 km (1.6 mi)
- Highest elevation: 1,910 m (6,270 ft)
- Lowest elevation: 346 m (1,135 ft)
- Terminus: Briksdalsbrevatnet

Briksdalsbreen (lit. 'the Briksdal glacier') is one of the most accessible and best known arms of the Jostedalsbreen glacier. Briksdalsbreen is located in Stryn Municipality in Vestland county, Norway. The glacier lies on the north side of the Jostedalsbreen, in Briksdalen (lit. 'the Briks valley') which is located at the end of the Oldedalen valley, about 25 kilometres (16 mi) south of the village of Olden. It is located inside Jostedalsbreen National Park. Briksdalsbreen terminates in a small glacial lake, Briksdalsbrevatnet, which lies 346 metres (1,135 ft) above sea level.

== History ==
The size of Briksdalsbreen depends not only on temperature, but is also strongly affected by precipitation. Measurements since 1900 show small changes in the first decades, with advances in the glacier front in 1910 and 1929. In the period from 1934 to 1951 the glacier receded by 800 metres (2,600 ft), exposing the glacial lake. In the period from 1967 until 1997 the glacier expanded by 465 metres (1,526 ft) and covered the whole lake, with the glacier front ending at the lake outlet. The glacier attracted international attention in the 1990s, as it was growing at a time when other European glaciers were in decline.

After the year 2000, the glacier once again receded. In 2004 it had receded to 230 metres (750 ft) behind the lake outlet and in 2007 the glacier front was on dry land behind the lake. In this regard, its position approximated the situation in the 1960s. However, glaciologists speculate that the size of the glacier was at its smallest since the 13th century.

In 2008, the glacier front had only receded by 12 metres (39 ft) since the 2007 measurement. The slower melting is explained by the glacier being completely on dry land. The winter of 2007–2008 saw an increase in glacier mass, which was expected to move the glacier front forward around 2010. This was confirmed in the fall of 2010, when measurements showed that the glacier had advanced 8 metres (26 ft) over the last year This was however in comparison with the 2009 measurements, which saw the glacier being the most receded since measurements started in 1900.

As the winter of 2009–2010 saw little snow and the summer temperature in 2010 was 2.5 to 3 °C (4.5 to 5.4 °F) above average, Professor Atle Nesje predicted that further strong receding would be seen in 2013. As Briksdalsbreen is now very narrow at some stretches, it is possible that it will temporarily disconnect from the larger Jostedalsbreen.

== Media gallery ==
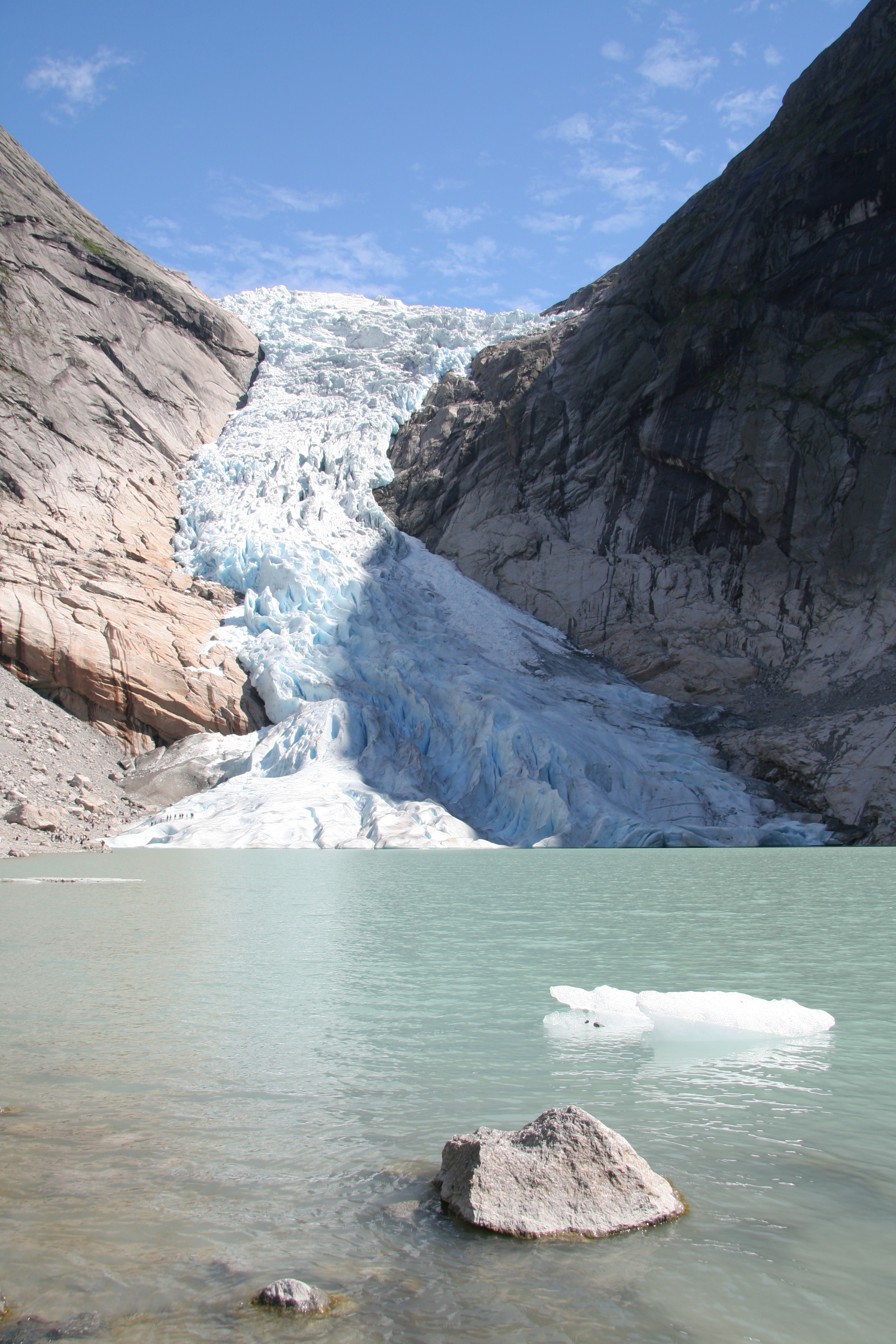
The glacier as seen from the lake in July 2006

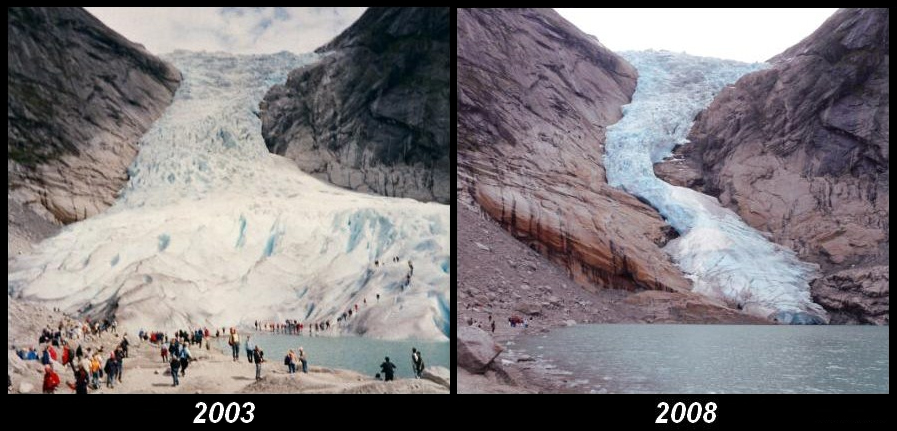
Briksdalsbreen Norway comparison 2003 & 2008
