= Roset, Vestland =

Village in Stryn Municipality, Norway

Roset Nordsida
- Village
- Interactive map of Roset
- Location within Vestland Location within Norway
- Coordinates: 61.8517°N 6.5182°E
- Country: Norway
- Region: Western Norway
- County: Vestland
- District: Nordfjord
- Municipality: Stryn Municipality
- Elevation: 186 m (610 ft)
- Time zone: UTC+01:00 (CET)
  - Summer (DST): UTC+02:00 (CEST)
- Post Code: 6795 Blaksæter

Roset (also: Nordsida) is a village in Stryn Municipality in Vestland county, Norway. The village is located on the northern shore of the Nordfjorden. The village is located about 15 kilometres (9.3 mi) east of the village of Randabygda and about 15 kilometres (9.3 mi) west of the village of Stryn. The village of Innvik lies directly across the Nordfjorden from Roset. Nordsida Church is located in Roset.
