= Olden Church =

Church in Vestland, Norway

- Olden kyrkje
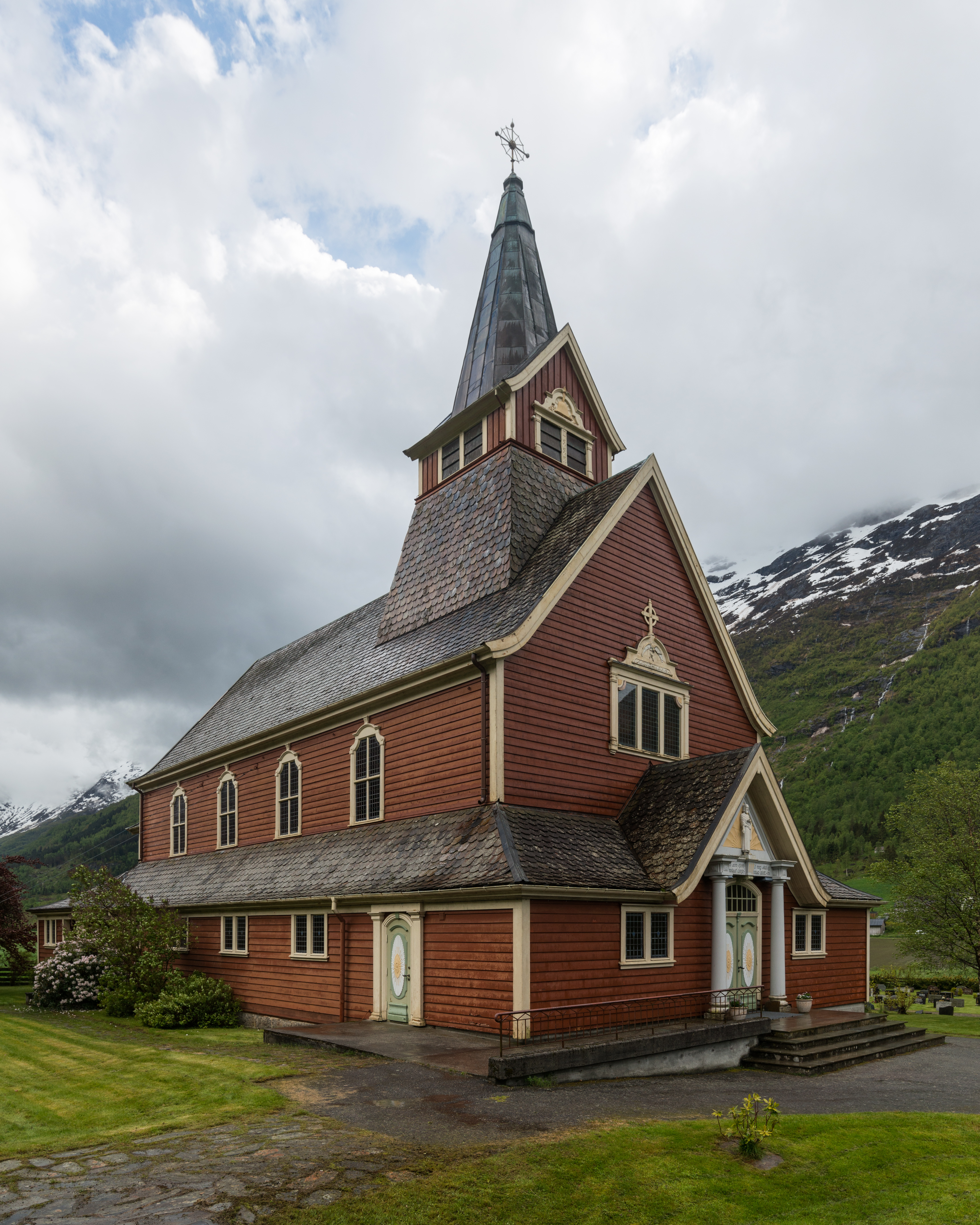
- View of the church
- Olden Church
- 61°49′39″N 6°48′29″E
- Location: Stryn Municipality, Vestland
- Country: Norway
- Denomination: Church of Norway
- Churchmanship: Evangelical Lutheran

History
- Status: Parish church
- Founded: 1934
- Consecrated: 19 Dec 1934

Architecture
- Functional status: Active
- Architect: Daniel J. Muri
- Architectural type: Long church
- Completed: 1934 (92 years ago)

Specifications
- Capacity: 500
- Materials: Wood

Administration
- Diocese: Bjørgvin bispedømme
- Deanery: Nordfjord prosti
- Parish: Olden
- Norwegian Cultural Heritage Site
- Type: Church
- Status: Listed
- ID: 223638

Olden Church (Norwegian: Olden kyrkje) is a parish church of the Church of Norway in Stryn Municipality in Vestland county, Norway. It is located in the village of Olden on the north end of the Oldedalen valley. It is the church for the Olden parish which is part of the Nordfjord prosti (deanery) in the Diocese of Bjørgvin. The red, wooden church was built in a long church design in 1934 using plans drawn up by the architect Daniel J. Muri. The church seats about 500 people.

== History ==
For centuries, the Old Olden Church (then known simply as the Olden Church) was the church for the Oldedalen valley. By the 20th century, the old church had been deemed to be too small for the parish. Discussions were held on whether or not to renovate, expand, or replace the old church. The Norwegian Directorate for Cultural Heritage and the Society for the Preservation of Ancient Norwegian Monuments both participated in the debate on the matter. In 1933, it was decided to build a new church on a nearby site and to keep the old church as a museum. The architect Daniel J. Muri was hired to design the new building. The new church was to be built on a site about 0.7 kilometres (0.43 mi) to the south of the old church. Construction began in the spring of 1934 and lasted for about six months. The new church was consecrated on 19 December 1934 by the Bishop Andreas Fleischer. In 1985, the main entry area was enlarged as well as the addition of bathroom facilities.

== Media gallery ==
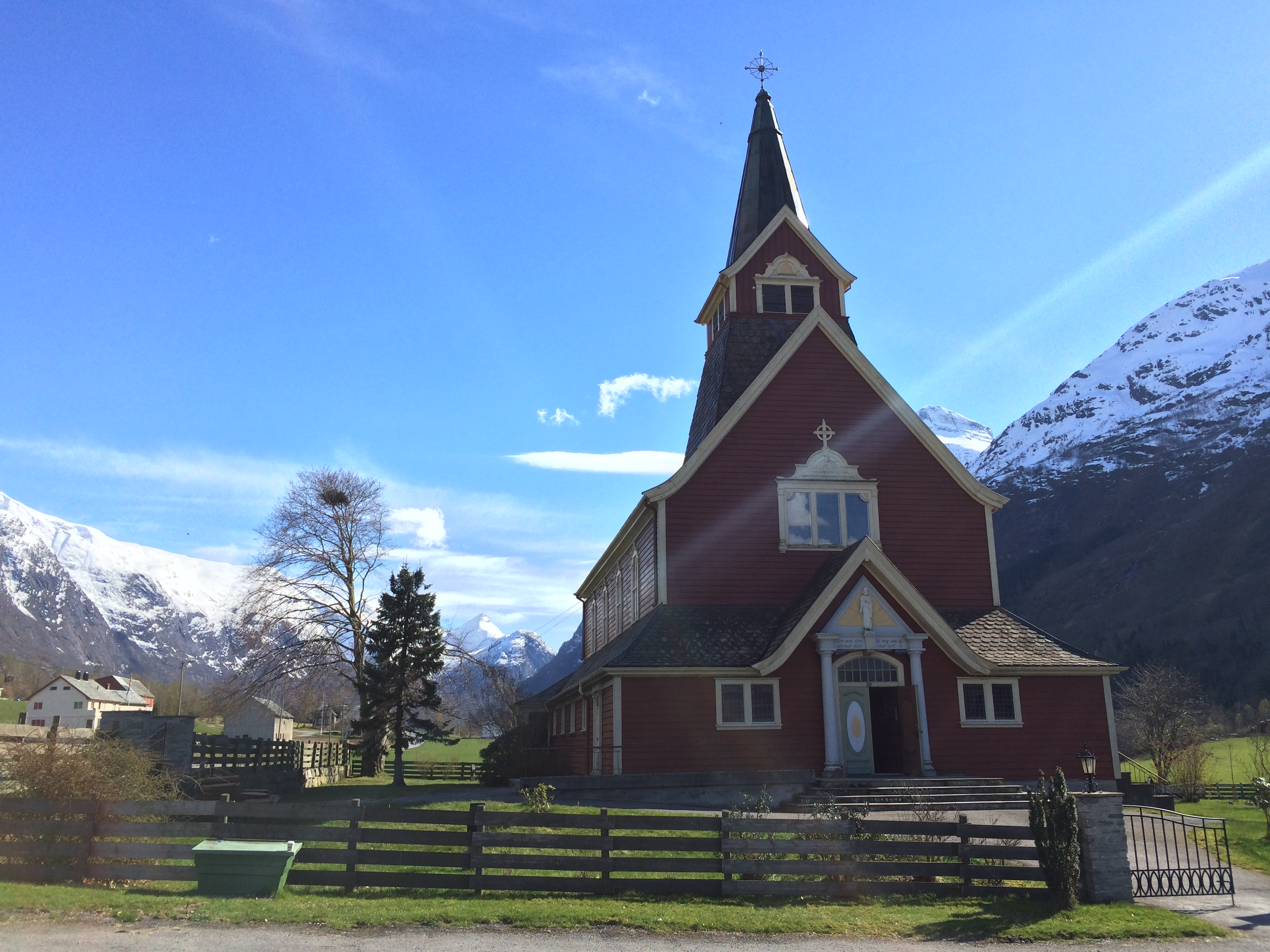

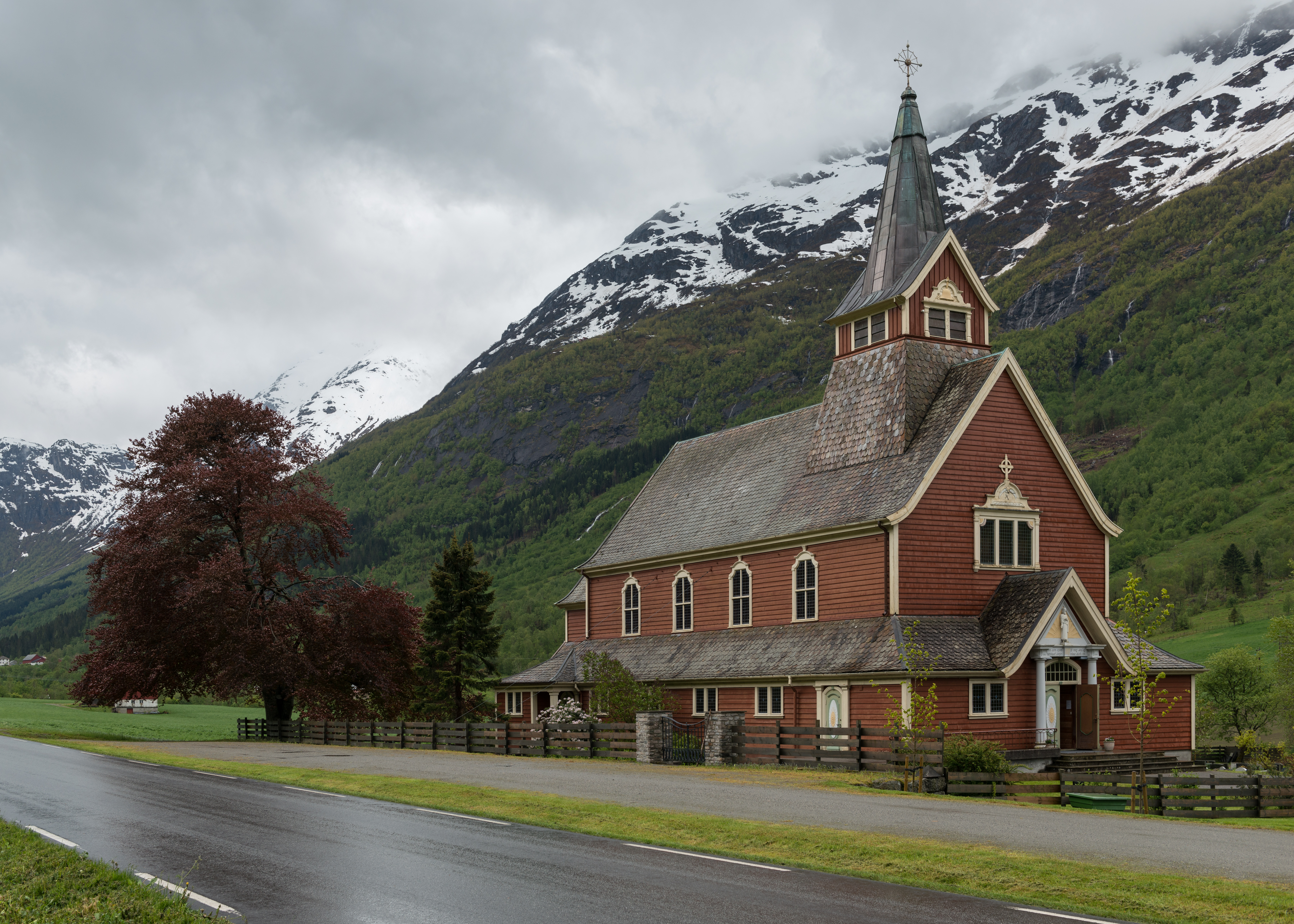

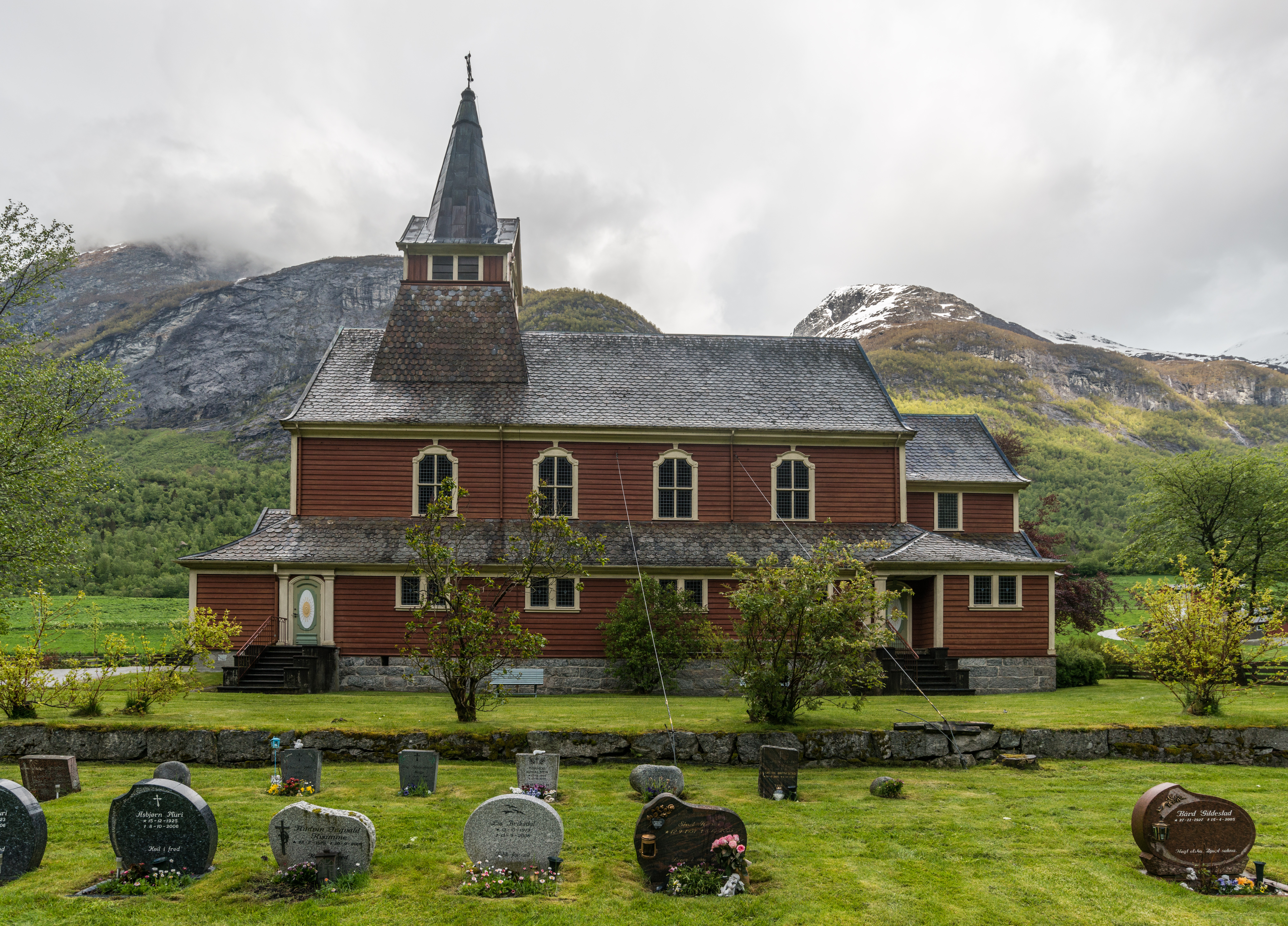

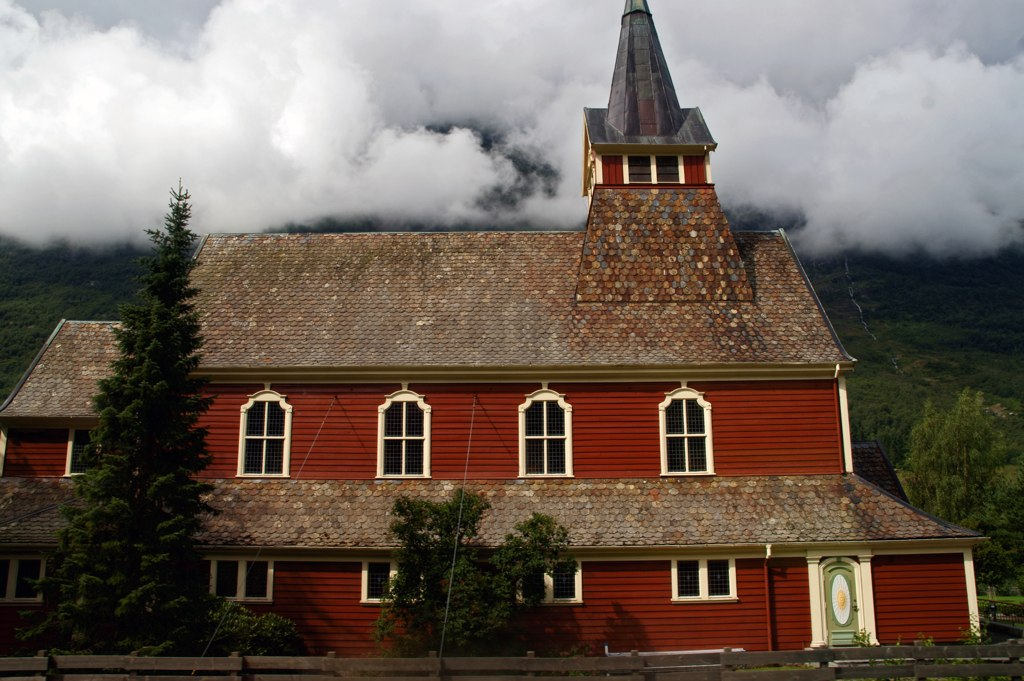

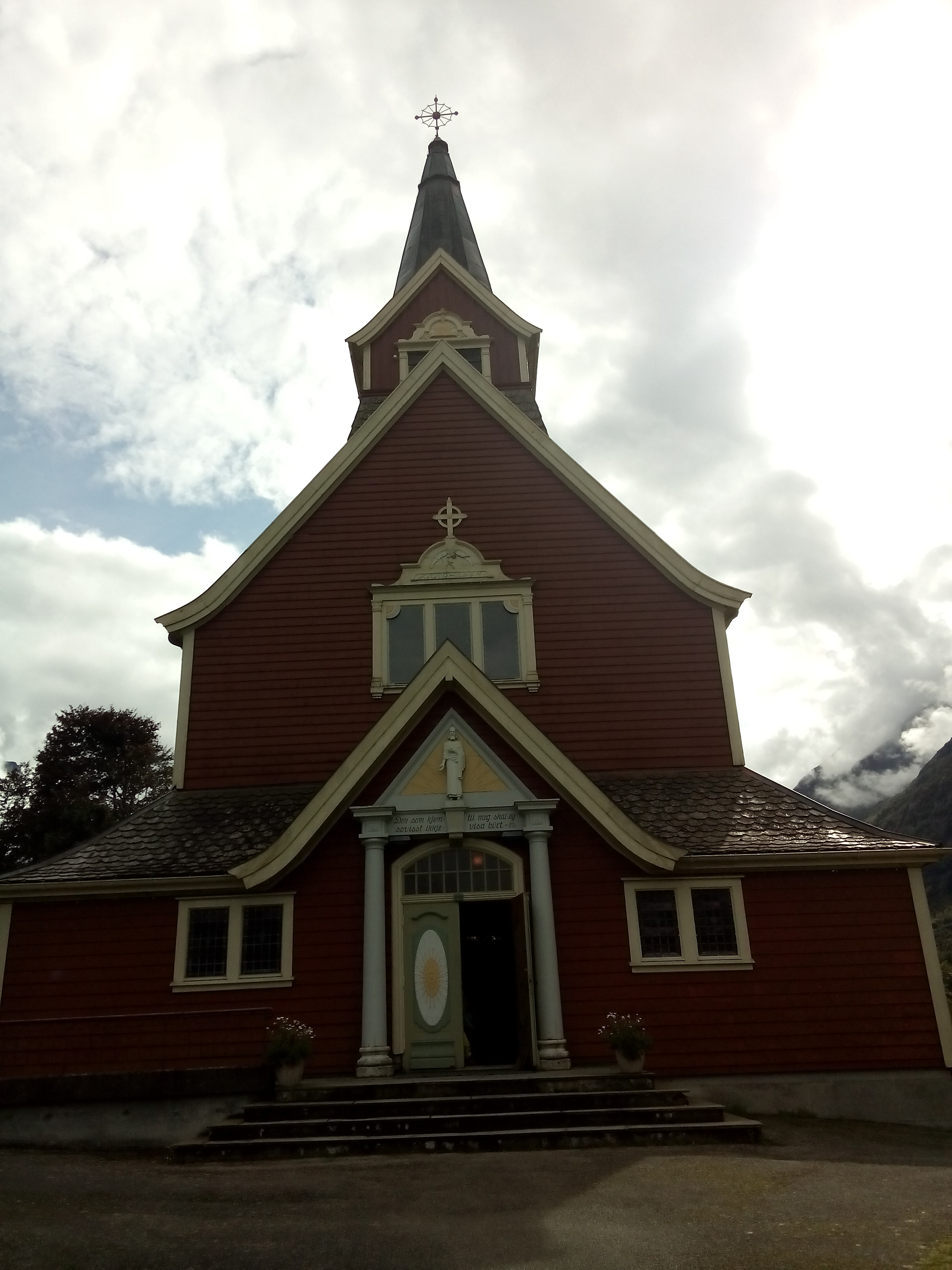

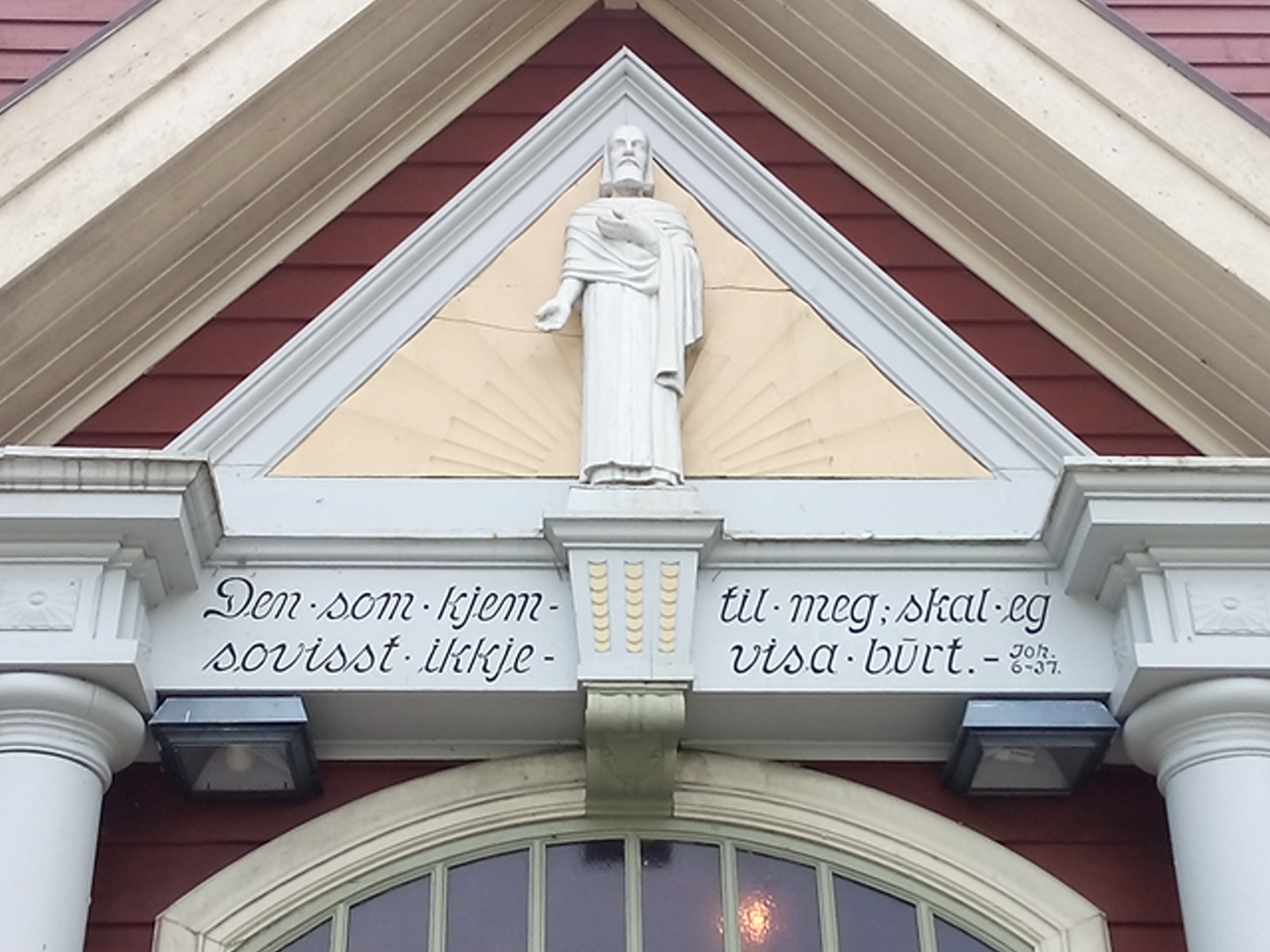

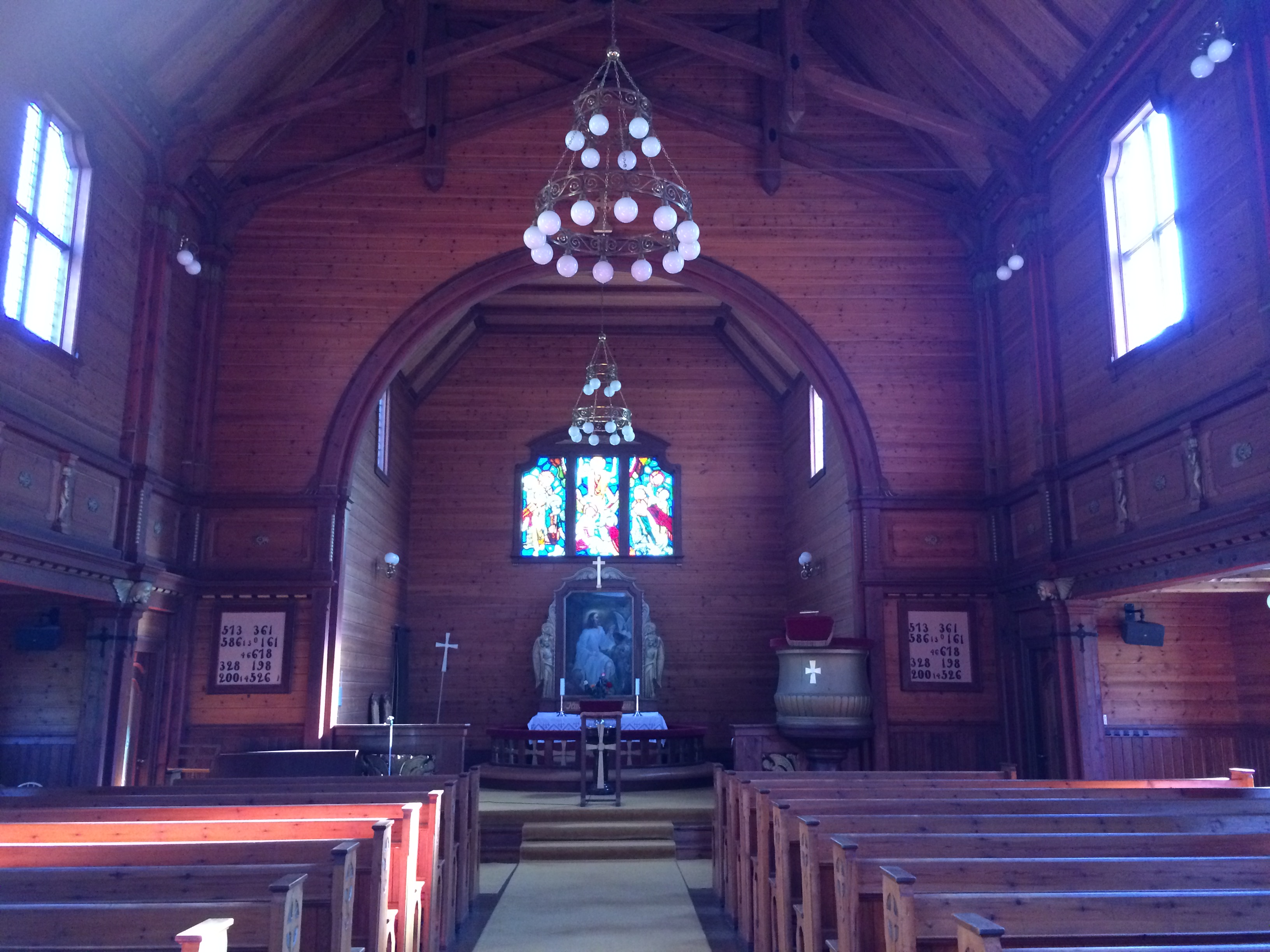

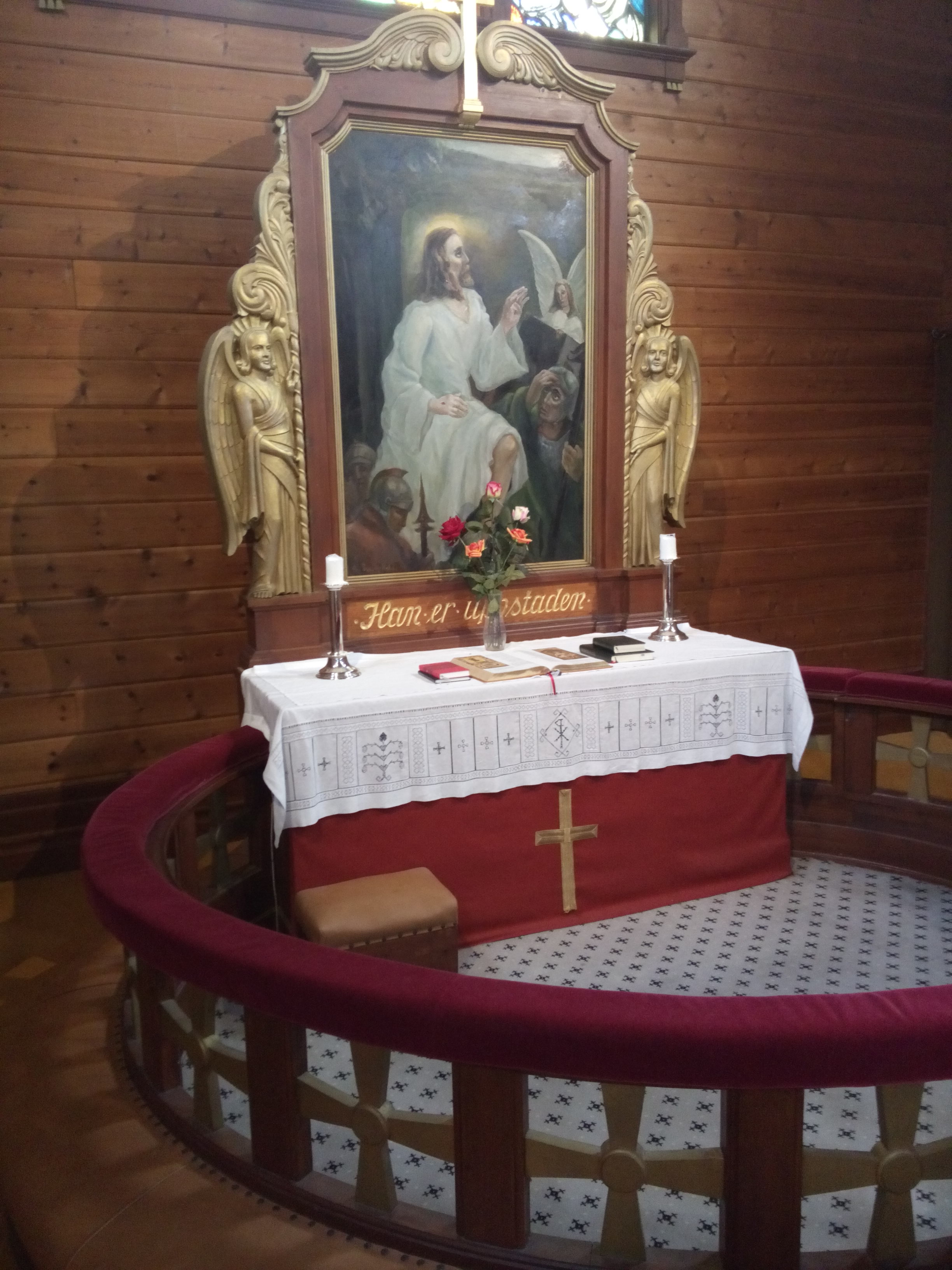

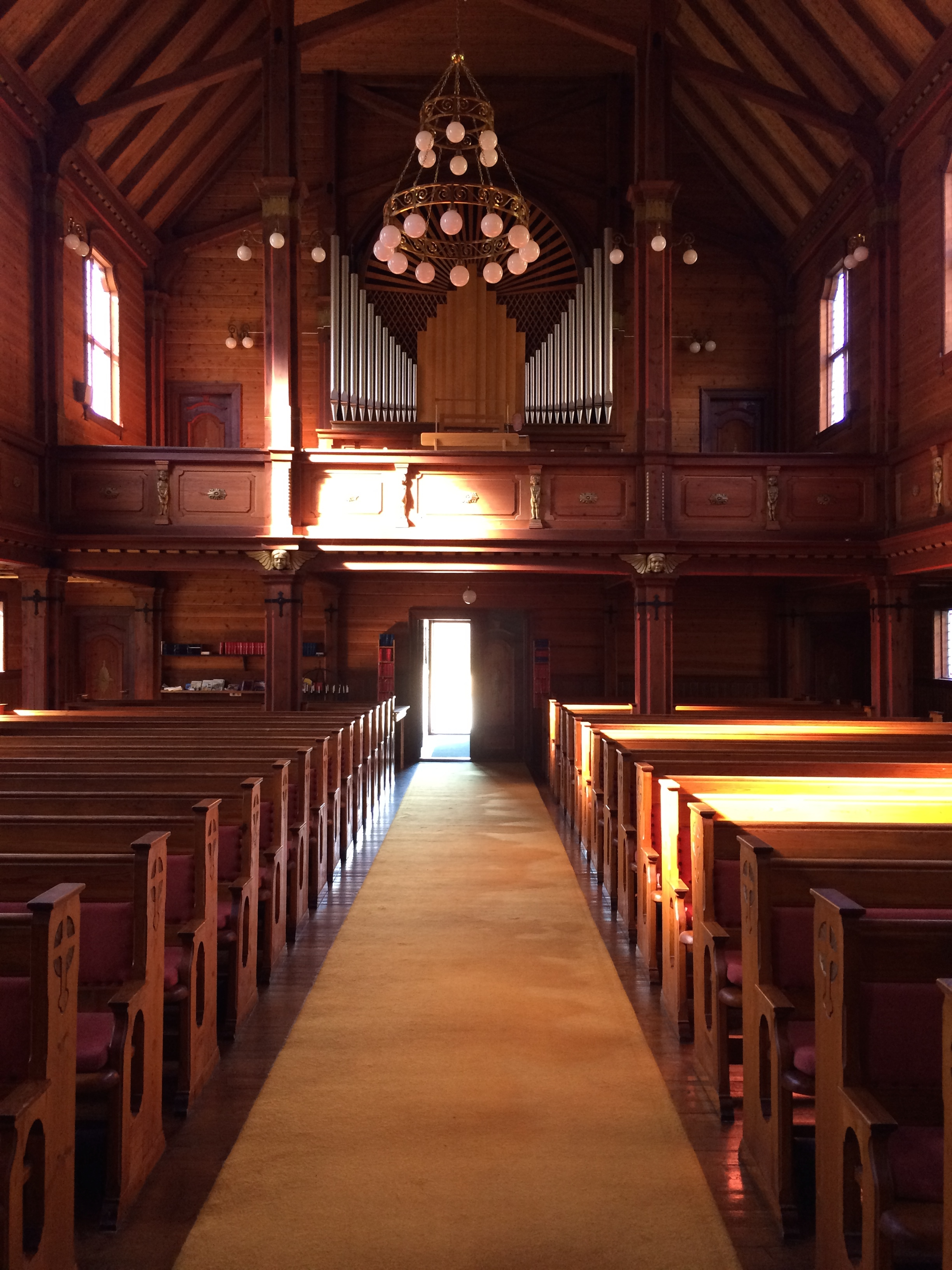

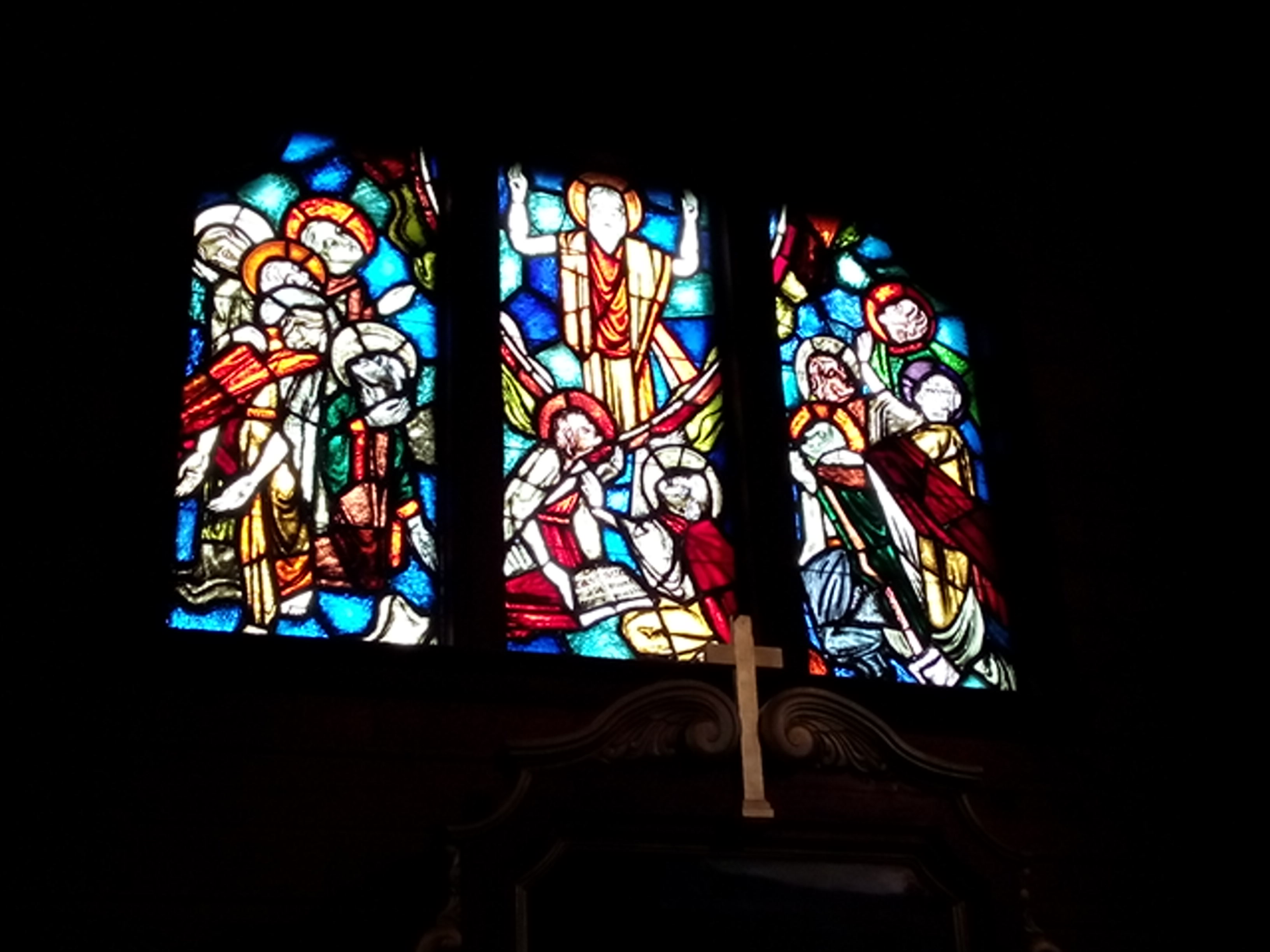

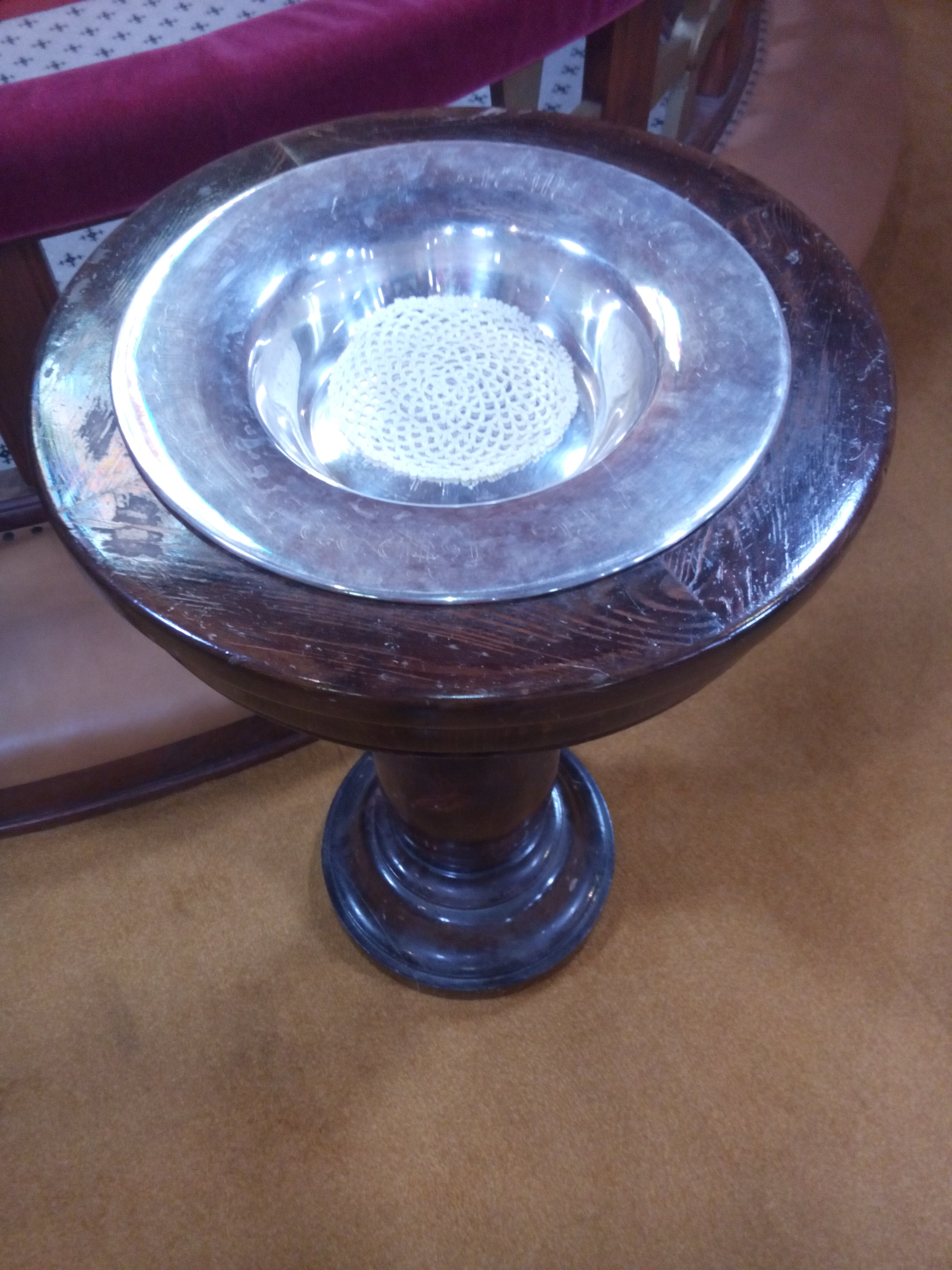

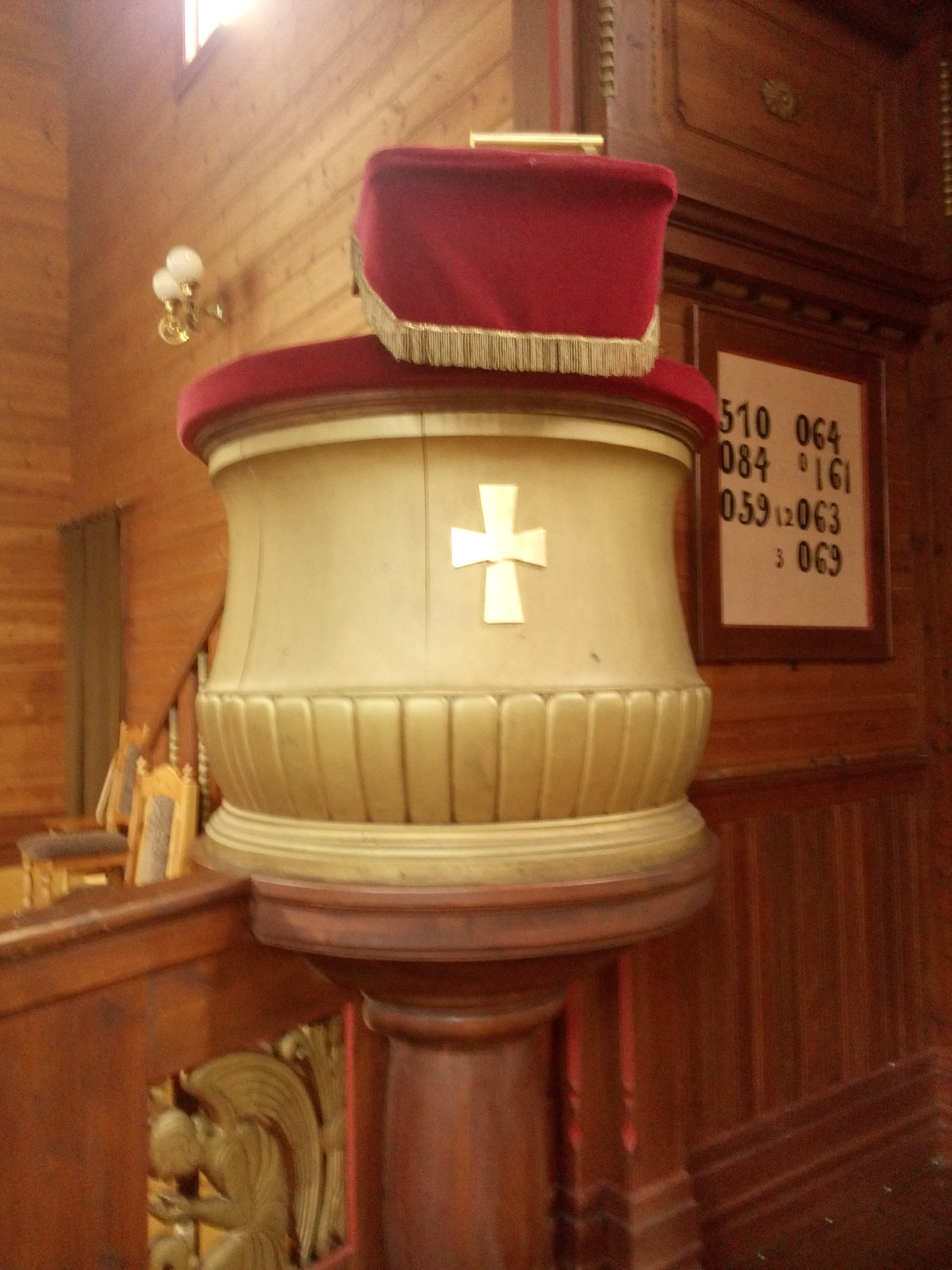
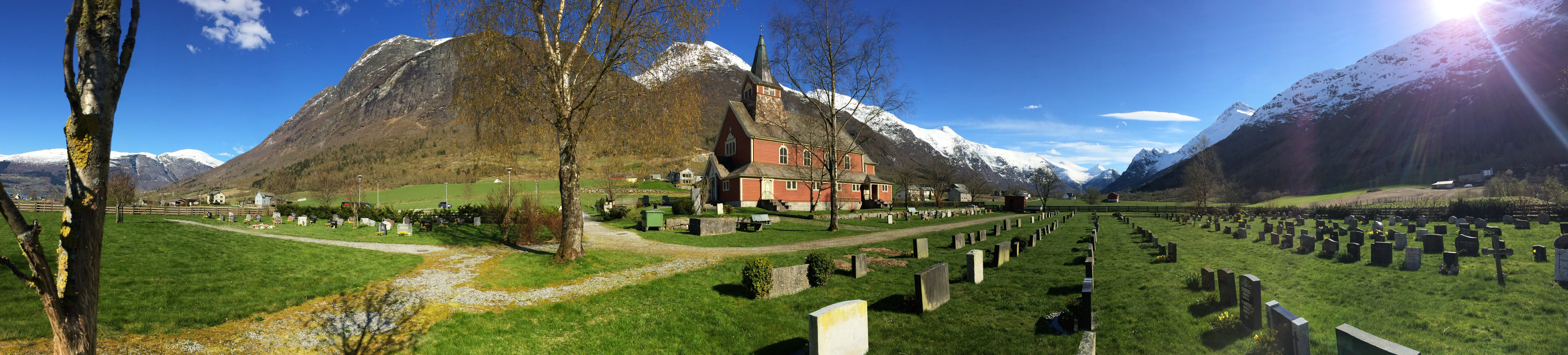

== See also ==
- List of churches in Bjørgvin
