= Stryn Municipality =

Municipality in Vestland, Norway

Stryn Municipality Stryn kommune
- Municipality
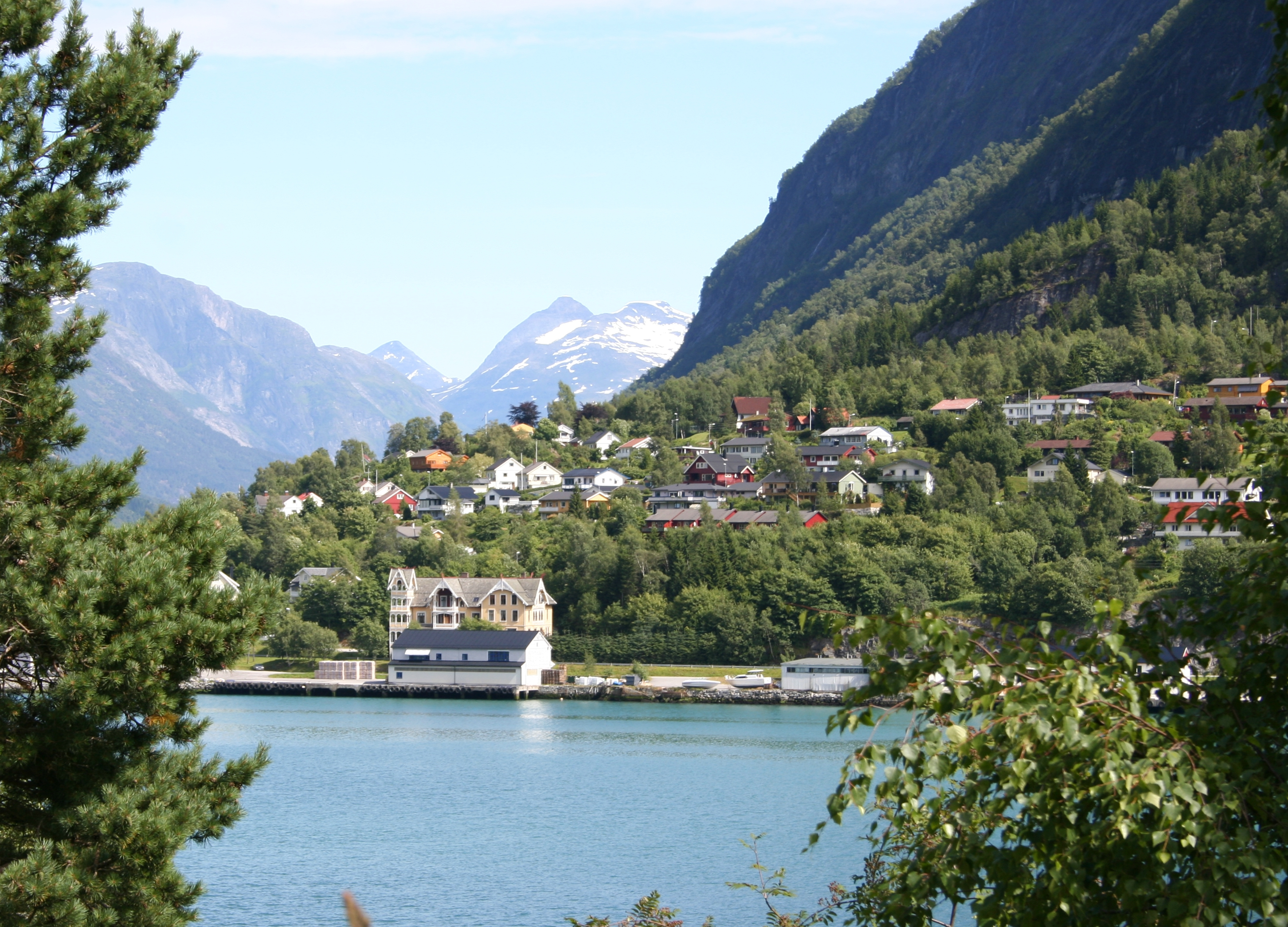
- View of Stryn

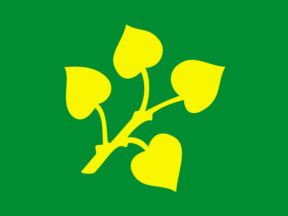
- Flag Coat of arms

- Vestland within Norway

- Stryn within Vestland
- Coordinates: 61°50′19″N 06°51′46″E
- Country: Norway
- County: Vestland
- District: Nordfjord
- Established: 1843
  - Preceded by: Innvik Municipality
- Administrative centre: Stryn

Government
  - Mayor (2019): Per Kjøllesdal (Sp)

Area
  - Total: 1,382.02 km^{2} (533.60 sq mi)
  - Land: 1,325.7 km^{2} (511.9 sq mi)
  - Water: 56.32 km^{2} (21.75 sq mi) 4.1%
  - Rank: #67 in Norway
- Highest elevation: 2,081.44 m (6,828.9 ft)

Population (2025)
  - Total: 7,311
  - Rank: #140 in Norway
  - Density: 5.3/km^{2} (14/sq mi)
  - Change (10 years): ▲ +1.9%
- Demonym: Stryning

Official language
  - Norwegian form: Nynorsk
- Time zone: UTC+01:00 (CET)
  - Summer (DST): UTC+02:00 (CEST)
- ISO 3166 code: NO-4651
- Website: Official website

Stryn is a municipality in the county of Vestland, Norway. It is located in the traditional district of Nordfjord. The administrative center of the municipality is the village of Stryn. The municipality is located along the innermost part of the Nordfjorden. Some of the main villages in Stryn Municipality include Loen, Innvik, Utvik, Randabygda, Olden, and Flo.

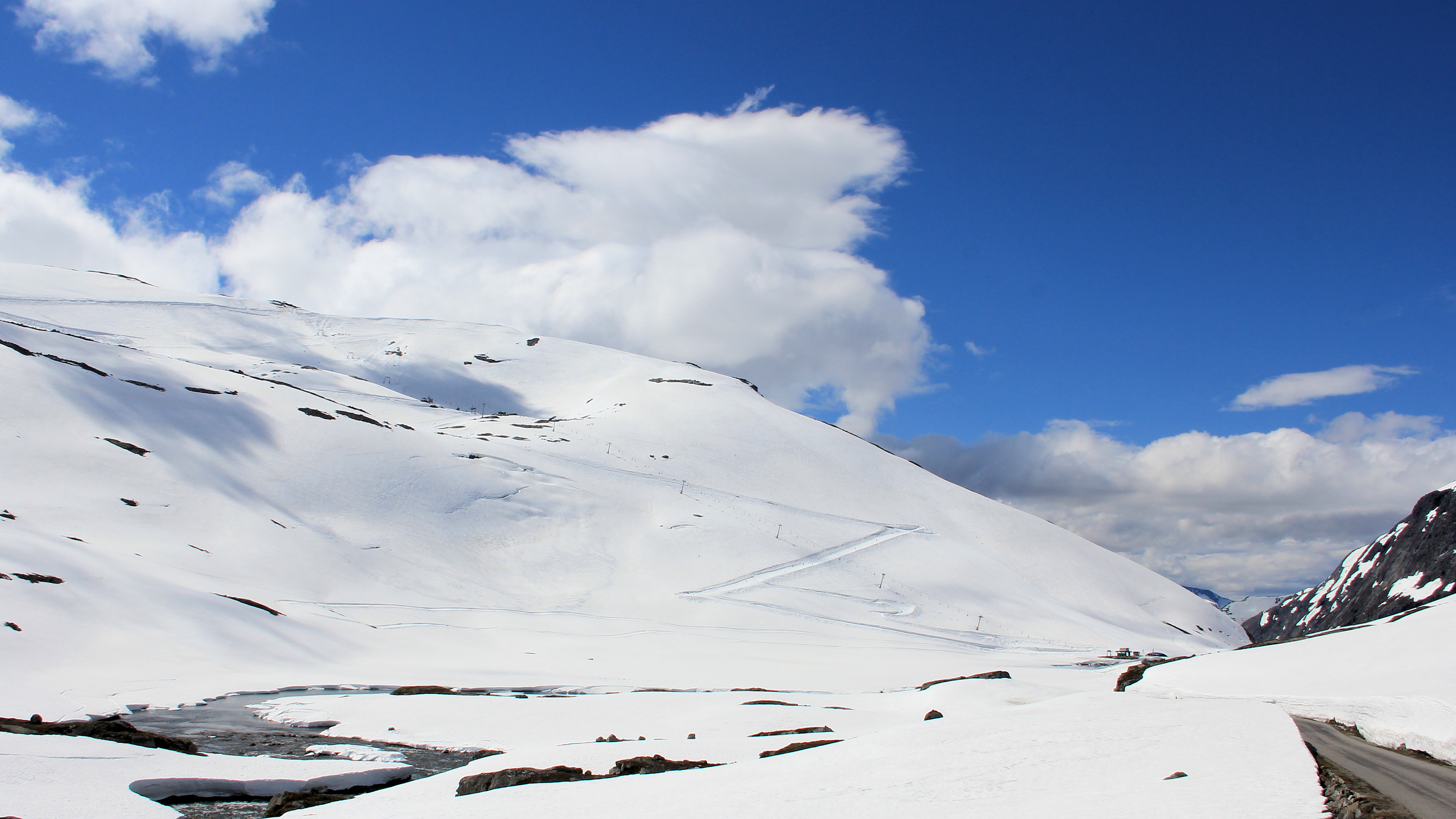
View towards Stryn summer ski center

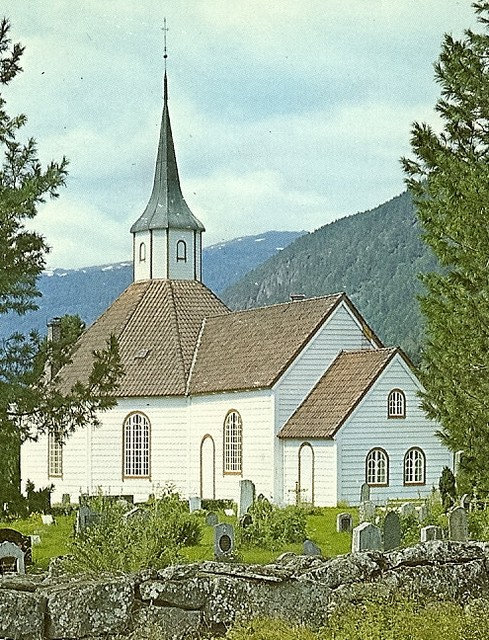
Innvik Church

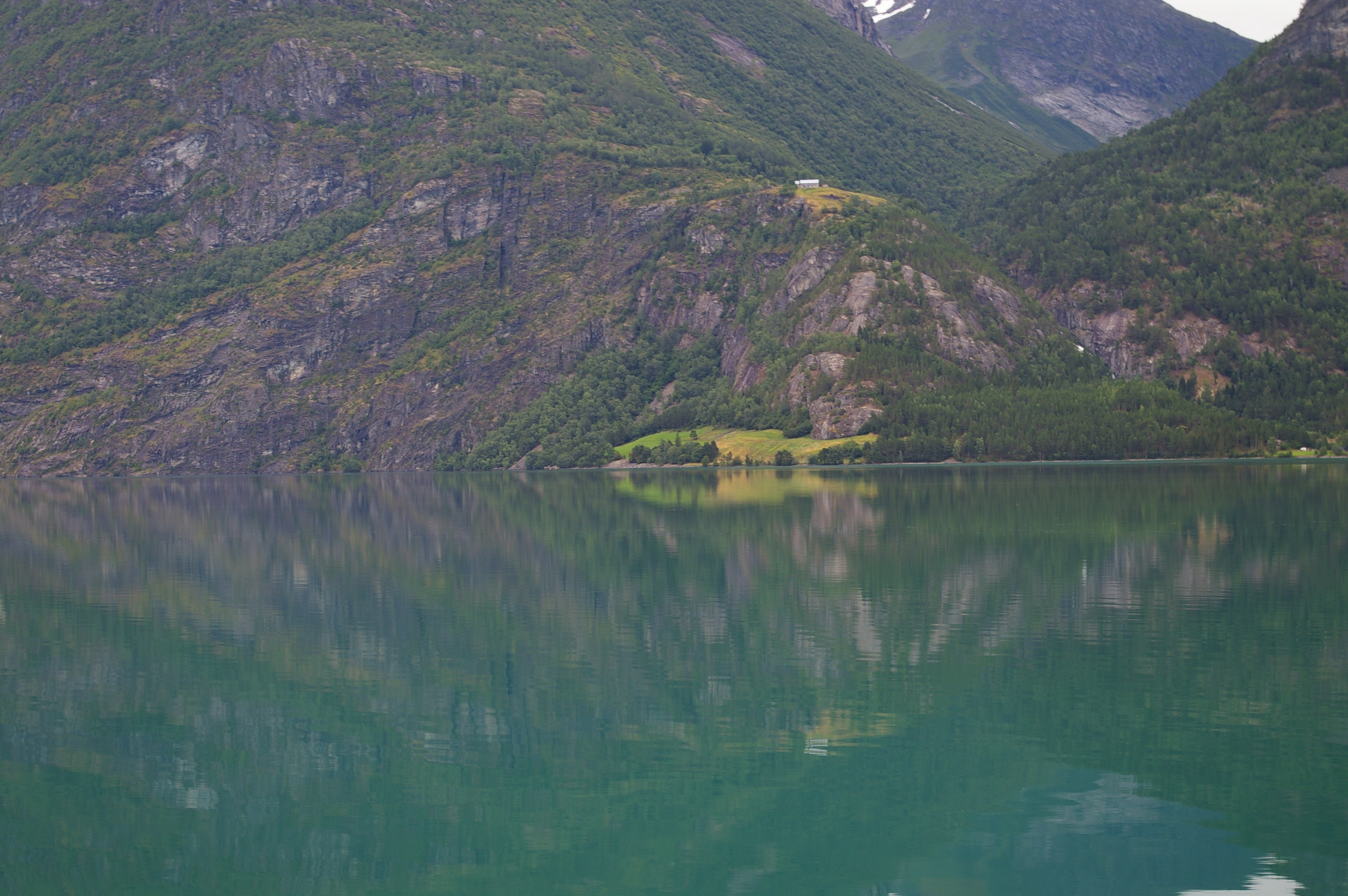
Oppstrynsvatnet Lake

The 1,382-square-kilometre (534 sq mi) municipality is the 67th largest by area out of the 357 municipalities in Norway. Stryn Municipality is the 140th most populous municipality in Norway with a population of 7,311. The municipality's population density is 5.3 inhabitants per square kilometre (14/sq mi), and its population has increased by 1.9% over the previous 10-year period.

Farming, forestry, fruit growing, animal breeding for furs, small manufacturing industries, tourism, and the service trades provide the main occupations. The river Stryneelva enters the village of Stryn from the east after passing through the Stryn Valley, from the large lake Oppstrynsvatn. The Jostedalsbreen National Park Center is on the shore of the lake.

Stryn Municipality has year-round glacier skiing at Stryn Sommerski. It is also the home of the footballer-brothers Tore André Flo, Jarle Flo and Jostein Flo, who grew up in the village of Stryn, as well as their footballing-cousin Håvard Flo who is from the town of Flo.

== General information ==
The parish of Indvigen (later spelled "Innvik") was established as Innvik Municipality on 1 January 1838 (see formannskapsdistrikt law). The original municipality was identical to the Innvik prestegjeld with the parishes (sokn) of Oppstryn, Nedstryn, Loen, Olden, Innvik, and Utvik. In 1843, the large Innvik Municipality was divided into two. The parishes of Loen, Oppstryn, and Nedstryn (population: 2,401) were separated and established as the new Stryn Municipality. The parishes of Olden, Innvik, and Utvik (population: 2,675) continued as a much smaller Innvik Municipality.

On 10 January 1922, the Raksgrenda area (population: 120) was transferred from Innvik Municipality to Stryn Municipality.

During the 1960s, many municipal mergers occurred across Norway due to the work of the Schei Committee. On 1 January 1965, a merger took place, combining the following areas into a new, much larger Stryn Municipality with a population of 7,211.

- all of Stryn Municipality (population: 2,982)
- all of Innvik Municipality (population: 3,003)
- the parts of Hornindal Municipality located east of the villages of Navelsaker and Holmøyvik (population: 1,184)
- the Hoplandsgrenda area of Gloppen Municipality (population: 42)

On 1 January 1977, the parts of the old Hornindal Municipality that were merged into Stryn Municipality in 1965 were transferred back to the newly re-constituted Hornindal Municipality. The population of Stryn Municipality decreased by 1,202 due to this border adjustment.

On 1 January 2019, the Maurset area in the southern part of the neighboring Hornindal Municipality (population: 19) was transferred from Hornindal Municipality to Stryn Municipality.

Historically, this municipality was part of the old Sogn og Fjordane county. On 1 January 2020, the municipality became part of the newly formed Vestland county (after Hordaland and Sogn og Fjordane counties were merged).

=== Name ===
The municipality (originally the parish) is likely named after the local river Stryneelva (Old Norse: Strjónar). The name is derived from the word strjónn which means "(strong) stream".

=== Coat of arms ===
The coat of arms was granted on 11 December 1987. The official blazon is "Vert, a linden branch Or in bend sinister with four leaves" (Norwegian: På grønn grunn ein venstre skråstilt gull lindekvist med fire blad). This means the arms have a green field (background) and the charge is a linden (tilia) branch with four leaves. The charge has a tincture of Or, which means it is commonly colored yellow, but if it is made out of metal, then gold is used. The linden was chosen to represent the vast deciduous forests in the region; the branch represents the main fjord through the municipality; and the four leaves represent the four main village areas along the fjord. Heidi Heggdal designed the arms. The municipal flag has the same design as the coat of arms.

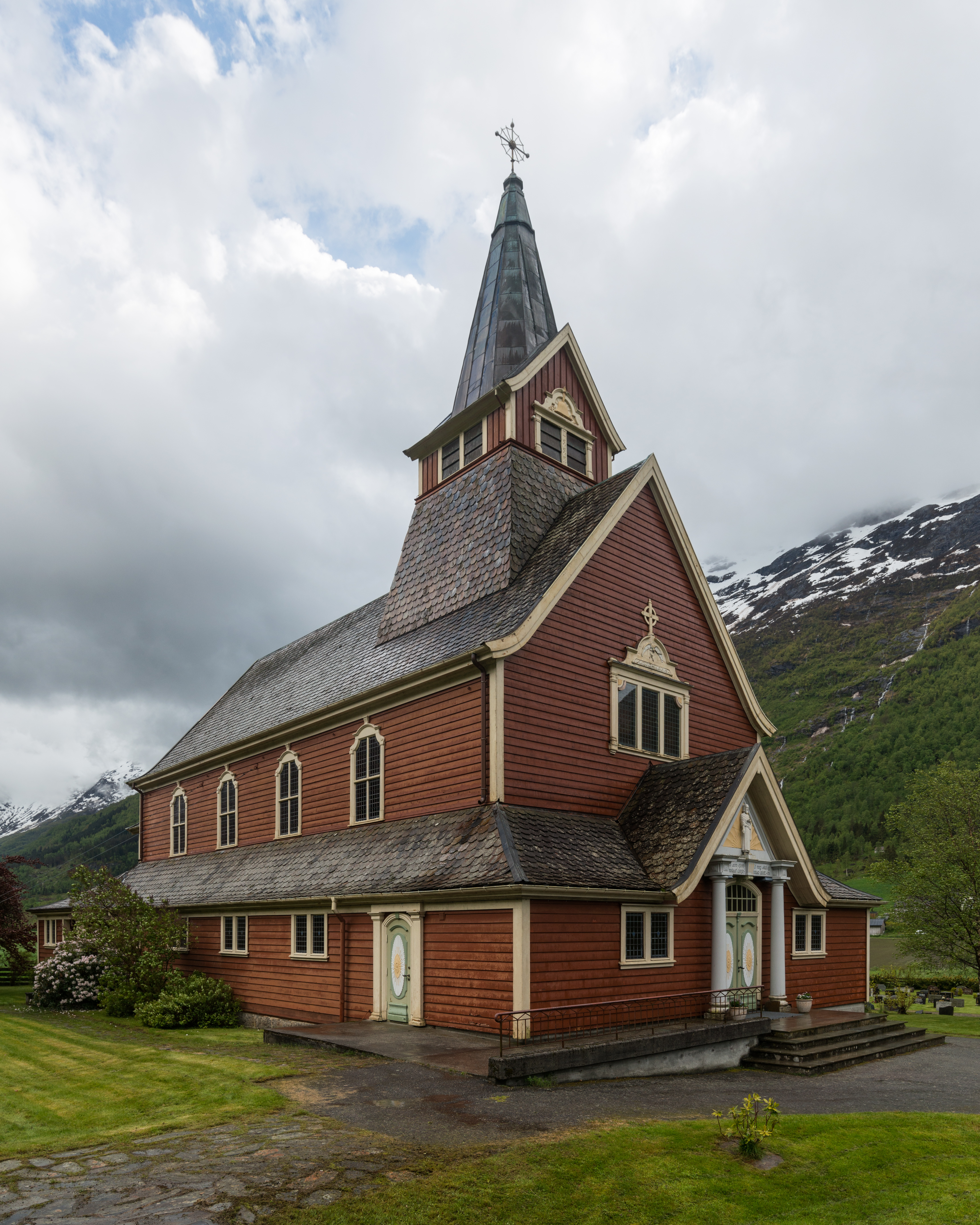
Olden Church

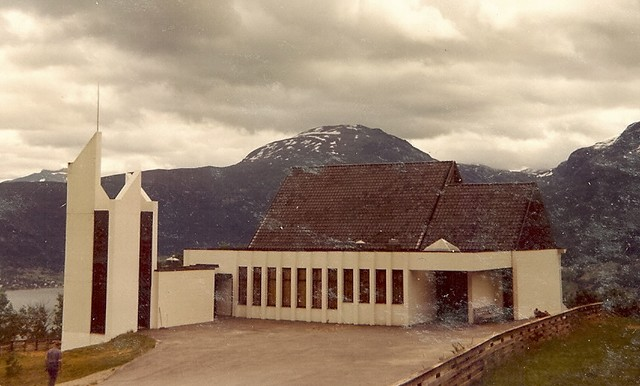
Nordsida Church

=== Churches ===
The Church of Norway has eight parishes (sokn) within Stryn Municipality. It is part of the Nordfjord prosti (deanery) in the Diocese of Bjørgvin.

Churches in Stryn Municipality
Parish (sokn)	Church name	Location of the church	Year built
Oppstryn	Oppstryn Church	Oppstryn	1863
Nedstryn	Nedstryn Church	Nedstryn	1859
Loen	Loen Church	Loen	1838
Innvik	Innvik Church	Innvik	1822
Utvik	Utvik Church	Utvik	1840
Olden	Olden Church	Olden	1934
Olden	Old Olden Church	Olden	1772
Olden	Ljosheim Chapel	Mykløy in Oldedalen	1924
Randabygda	Randabygd Church	Randabygda	1916
Nordsida	Nordsida Church	Roset	1973

== Government ==
Stryn Municipality is responsible for primary education (through 10th grade), outpatient health services, senior citizen services, welfare and other social services, zoning, economic development, and municipal roads and utilities. The municipality is governed by a municipal council of directly elected representatives. The mayor is indirectly elected by a vote of the municipal council. The municipality is under the jurisdiction of the Sogn og Fjordane District Court and the Gulating Court of Appeal.

=== Municipal council ===
The municipal council (Kommunestyre) of Stryn Municipality is made up of 25 representatives that are elected to four-year terms. The tables below show the current and historical composition of the council by political party.

Stryn kommunestyre 2023–2027
Party name (in Nynorsk)	Number of representatives
Labour Party (Arbeidarpartiet)	3
Progress Party (Framstegspartiet)	2
Conservative Party (Høgre)	6
Christian Democratic Party (Kristeleg Folkeparti)	2
Red Party (Raudt)	1
Centre Party (Senterpartiet)	8
Liberal Party (Venstre)	3
Total number of members:	25

Stryn kommunestyre 2019–2023
Party name (in Nynorsk)	Number of representatives
Labour Party (Arbeidarpartiet)	4
Progress Party (Framstegspartiet)	1
Conservative Party (Høgre)	8
Christian Democratic Party (Kristeleg Folkeparti)	1
Centre Party (Senterpartiet)	9
Liberal Party (Venstre)	2
Total number of members:	25

Stryn kommunestyre 2015–2019
Party name (in Nynorsk)	Number of representatives
Labour Party (Arbeidarpartiet)	3
Progress Party (Framstegspartiet)	1
Conservative Party (Høgre)	10
Christian Democratic Party (Kristeleg Folkeparti)	2
Centre Party (Senterpartiet)	7
Liberal Party (Venstre)	2
Total number of members:	25

Stryn kommunestyre 2011–2015
Party name (in Nynorsk)	Number of representatives
Labour Party (Arbeidarpartiet)	4
Progress Party (Framstegspartiet)	2
Conservative Party (Høgre)	8
Christian Democratic Party (Kristeleg Folkeparti)	2
Centre Party (Senterpartiet)	7
Liberal Party (Venstre)	2
Total number of members:	25

Stryn kommunestyre 2007–2011
Party name (in Nynorsk)	Number of representatives
Labour Party (Arbeidarpartiet)	7
Progress Party (Framstegspartiet)	3
Conservative Party (Høgre)	3
Christian Democratic Party (Kristeleg Folkeparti)	2
Centre Party (Senterpartiet)	8
Socialist Left Party (Sosialistisk Venstreparti)	1
Liberal Party (Venstre)	1
Total number of members:	25

Stryn kommunestyre 2003–2007
Party name (in Nynorsk)	Number of representatives
Labour Party (Arbeidarpartiet)	7
Progress Party (Framstegspartiet)	2
Conservative Party (Høgre)	3
Christian Democratic Party (Kristeleg Folkeparti)	3
Centre Party (Senterpartiet)	7
Socialist Left Party (Sosialistisk Venstreparti)	2
Liberal Party (Venstre)	1
Total number of members:	25

Stryn kommunestyre 1999–2003
Party name (in Nynorsk)	Number of representatives
Labour Party (Arbeidarpartiet)	5
Progress Party (Framstegspartiet)	4
Conservative Party (Høgre)	5
Christian Democratic Party (Kristeleg Folkeparti)	4
Centre Party (Senterpartiet)	11
Liberal Party (Venstre)	2
Total number of members:	31

Stryn kommunestyre 1995–1999
Party name (in Nynorsk)	Number of representatives
Labour Party (Arbeidarpartiet)	5
Progress Party (Framstegspartiet)	3
Conservative Party (Høgre)	6
Christian Democratic Party (Kristeleg Folkeparti)	3
Centre Party (Senterpartiet)	12
Liberal Party (Venstre)	2
Total number of members:	31

Stryn kommunestyre 1991–1995
Party name (in Nynorsk)	Number of representatives
Labour Party (Arbeidarpartiet)	6
Progress Party (Framstegspartiet)	1
Conservative Party (Høgre)	7
Christian Democratic Party (Kristeleg Folkeparti)	3
Red Electoral Alliance (Raud Valallianse)	1
Centre Party (Senterpartiet)	12
Liberal Party (Venstre)	1
Total number of members:	31

Stryn kommunestyre 1987–1991
Party name (in Nynorsk)	Number of representatives
Labour Party (Arbeidarpartiet)	7
Conservative Party (Høgre)	10
Christian Democratic Party (Kristeleg Folkeparti)	5
Red Electoral Alliance (Raud Valallianse)	1
Centre Party (Senterpartiet)	12
Liberal Party (Venstre)	2
Total number of members:	37

Stryn kommunestyre 1983–1987
Party name (in Nynorsk)	Number of representatives
Labour Party (Arbeidarpartiet)	9
Conservative Party (Høgre)	9
Christian Democratic Party (Kristeleg Folkeparti)	6
Centre Party (Senterpartiet)	11
Liberal Party (Venstre)	2
Total number of members:	37

Stryn kommunestyre 1979–1983
Party name (in Nynorsk)	Number of representatives
Labour Party (Arbeidarpartiet)	7
Conservative Party (Høgre)	8
Christian Democratic Party (Kristeleg Folkeparti)	6
Centre Party (Senterpartiet)	11
Liberal Party (Venstre)	3
Local list for Olden (Bygdeliste for Olden)	2
Total number of members:	37

Stryn kommunestyre 1975–1979
Party name (in Nynorsk)	Number of representatives
Labour Party (Arbeidarpartiet)	4
Conservative Party (Høgre)	5
Christian Democratic Party (Kristeleg Folkeparti)	5
Centre Party (Senterpartiet)	7
Liberal Party (Venstre)	2
Common list for Hornindal (Samlingslista for Hornindal)	4
Non-party election list from Hornindal (Upolitisk Valliste frå Hornindal)	1
Local list for the old Stryn Municipality with Nordsida (Bygdeliste for tidlegare Stryn kommune med Nordsida)	4
Local list for Innvik, Utvik, and Tistam (Bygdeliste for Innvik, Utvik og Tistam)	2
Local list for Olden (Bygdeliste for Olden)	3
Total number of members:	37

Stryn kommunestyre 1971–1975
Party name (in Nynorsk)	Number of representatives
Labour Party (Arbeidarpartiet)	7
Conservative Party (Høgre)	4
Christian Democratic Party (Kristeleg Folkeparti)	5
Centre Party (Senterpartiet)	13
Liberal Party (Venstre)	3
Local List(s) (Lokale lister)	5
Total number of members:	37

Stryn kommunestyre 1967–1971
Party name (in Nynorsk)	Number of representatives
Labour Party (Arbeidarpartiet)	6
Conservative Party (Høgre)	6
Christian Democratic Party (Kristeleg Folkeparti)	5
Centre Party (Senterpartiet)	11
Liberal Party (Venstre)	4
Local List(s) (Lokale lister)	5
Total number of members:	37

Stryn kommunestyre 1963–1967
Party name (in Nynorsk)	Number of representatives
Labour Party (Arbeidarpartiet)	4
Conservative Party (Høgre)	3
Christian Democratic Party (Kristeleg Folkeparti)	2
Centre Party (Senterpartiet)	8
Liberal Party (Venstre)	3
Local List(s) (Lokale lister)	1
Total number of members:	21
Note: On 1 January 1965, Innvik Municipality and some other smaller areas became part of Stryn Municipality.

Stryn heradsstyre 1959–1963
Party name (in Nynorsk)	Number of representatives
Labour Party (Arbeidarpartiet)	4
Conservative Party (Høgre)	3
Centre Party (Senterpartiet)	9
Liberal Party (Venstre)	4
Local List(s) (Lokale lister)	1
Total number of members:	21

Stryn heradsstyre 1955–1959
Party name (in Nynorsk)	Number of representatives
Labour Party (Arbeidarpartiet)	4
Conservative Party (Høgre)	2
Farmers' Party (Bondepartiet)	10
Liberal Party (Venstre)	5
Total number of members:	21

Stryn heradsstyre 1951–1955
Party name (in Nynorsk)	Number of representatives
Labour Party (Arbeidarpartiet)	5
Conservative Party (Høgre)	2
Farmers' Party (Bondepartiet)	11
Liberal Party (Venstre)	6
Total number of members:	24

Stryn heradsstyre 1947–1951
Party name (in Nynorsk)	Number of representatives
Labour Party (Arbeidarpartiet)	4
Farmers' Party (Bondepartiet)	9
Liberal Party (Venstre)	4
Local List(s) (Lokale lister)	7
Total number of members:	24

Stryn heradsstyre 1945–1947
Party name (in Nynorsk)	Number of representatives
Labour Party (Arbeidarpartiet)	5
Farmers' Party (Bondepartiet)	10
Liberal Party (Venstre)	6
Local List(s) (Lokale lister)	3
Total number of members:	24

Stryn heradsstyre 1937–1941*
Party name (in Nynorsk)	Number of representatives
Labour Party (Arbeidarpartiet)	3
Farmers' Party (Bondepartiet)	8
Liberal Party (Venstre)	5
Local List(s) (Lokale lister)	8
Total number of members:	24
Note: Due to the German occupation of Norway during World War II, no elections were held for new municipal councils until after the war ended in 1945.

=== Mayors ===
The mayor (Nynorsk: ordførar) of Stryn Municipality is the political leader of the municipality and the chairperson of the municipal council. Here is a list of people who have held this position:

- 1843–1844: Arent Uchermann
- 1845–1845: Ole Vik
- 1846–1847: Harald Kolbeinsson Gutdal
- 1848–1855: Peter L. Brandt
- 1857–1859: Rev. Gabriel Andreas Heiberg
- 1860–1863: Jon Nilsson Seime
- 1864–1889: Arne Olsson Tonning
- 1890–1910: Sigmund Kolbeinsen Aarnes
- 1913–1928: Rasmus Larsson Skåre
- 1928–1928: Per Nedreberg
- 1929–1937: Per Lunde
- 1938–1940: Per Nedreberg
- 1941–1945: Nils Bergem
- 1945–1945: Per Nedreberg
- 1946–1952: Jon Øvre-Flo
- 1952–1959: Rasmus Langeset
- 1960–1964: Audun Næss
- 1965–1971: Knut Mork
- 1972–1975: Mathias Hilde
- 1976–1976: Paul Svarstad (H)
- 1977–1983: Leiv Blakset (Sp)
- 1984–1987: Oddvin Drageset (Sp)
- 1988–1991: Inger Hoff (H)
- 1992–1999: Oddvin Drageset (Sp)
- 1999–2011: Nils Petter Støyva (Ap)
- 2011–2019: Sven Flo (H)
- 2019–present: Per Kjøllesdal (Sp)

== Geography ==
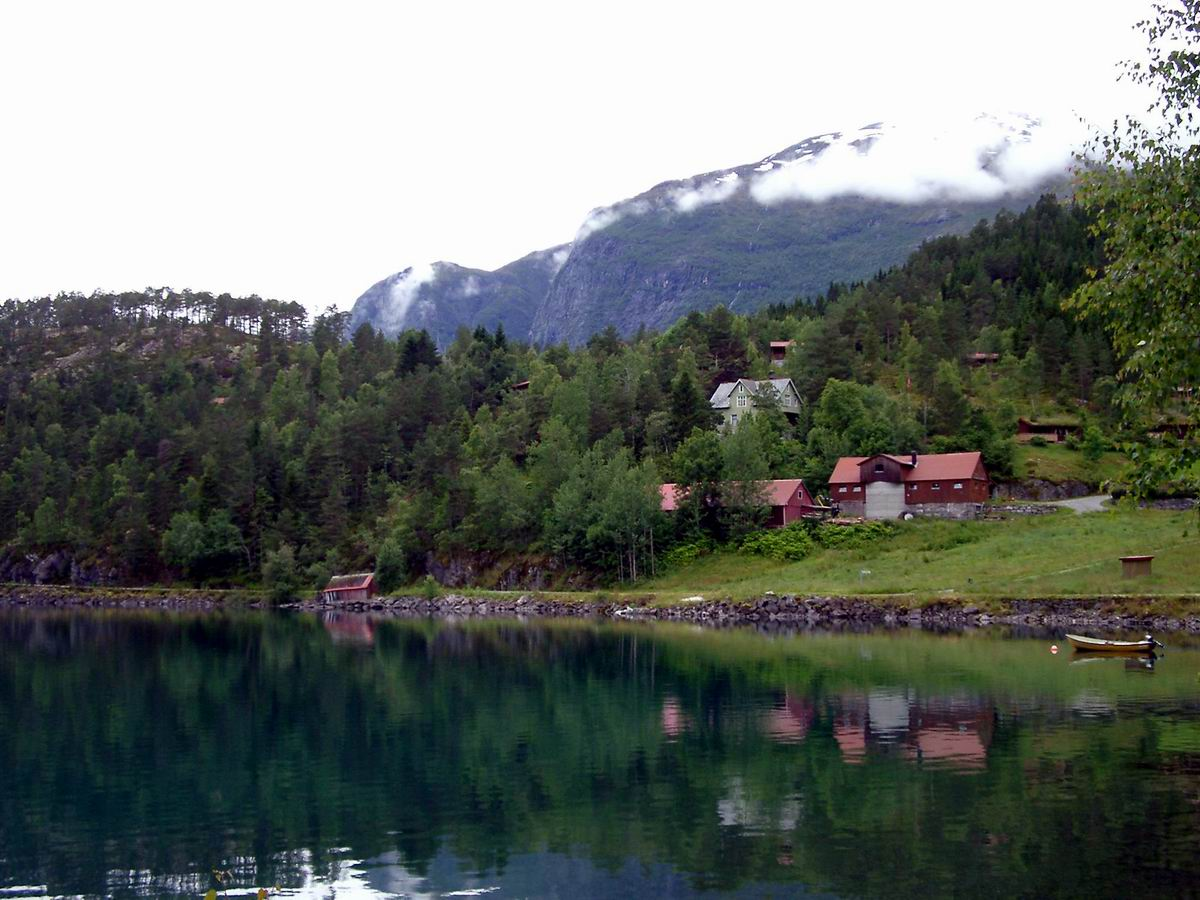
Lovatnet

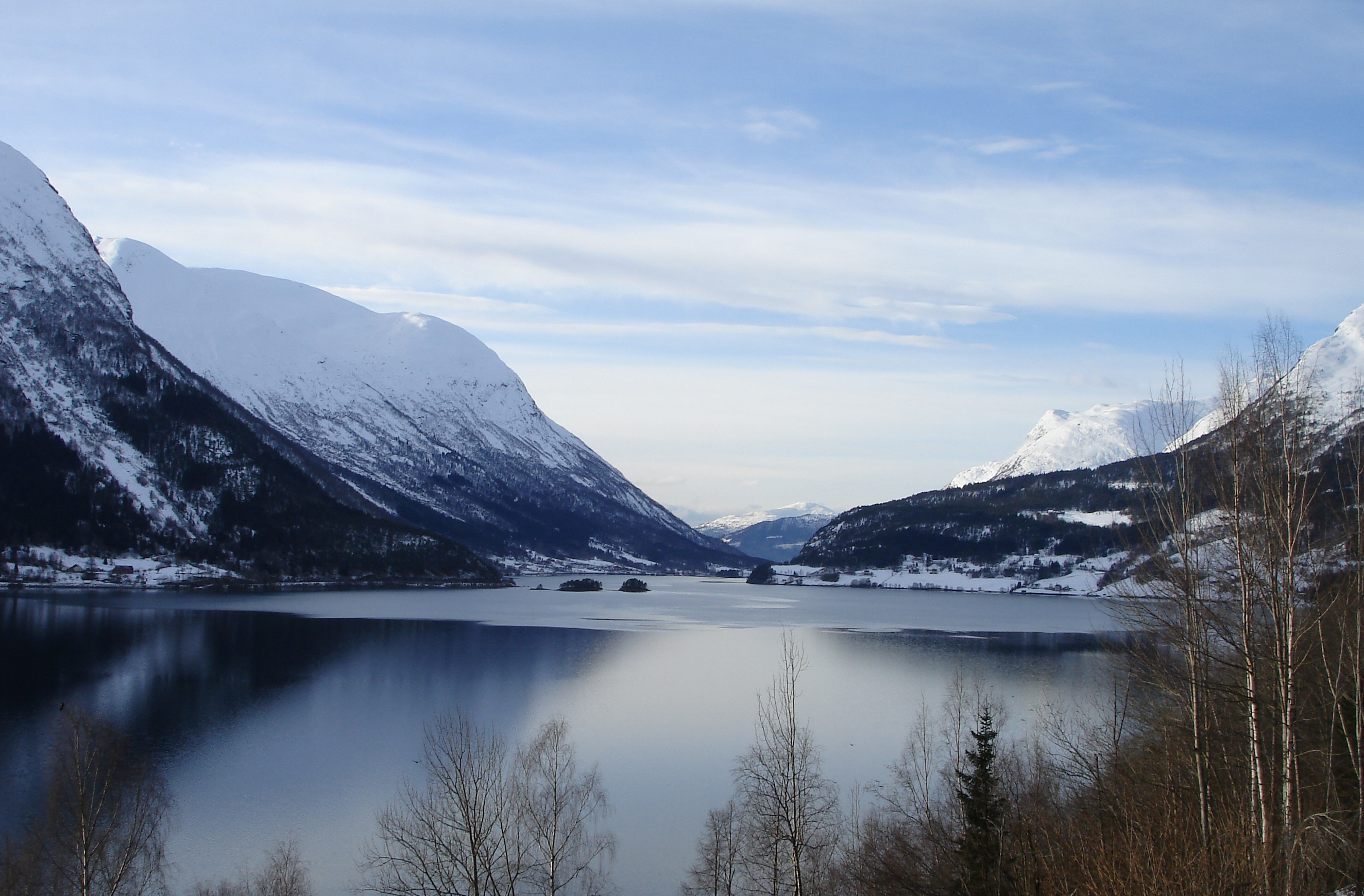
Oppstrynsvatnet

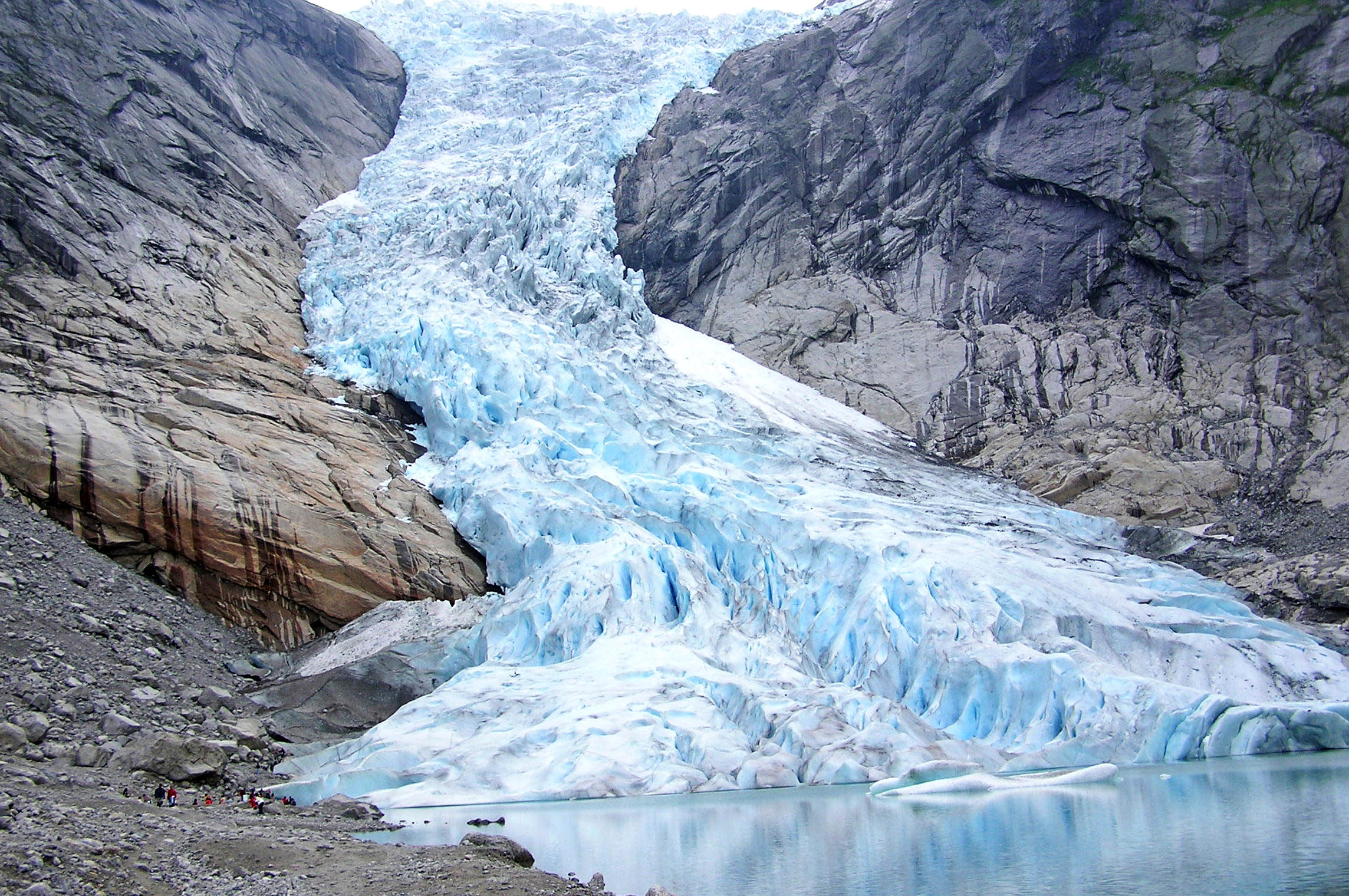
Briksdal Glacier

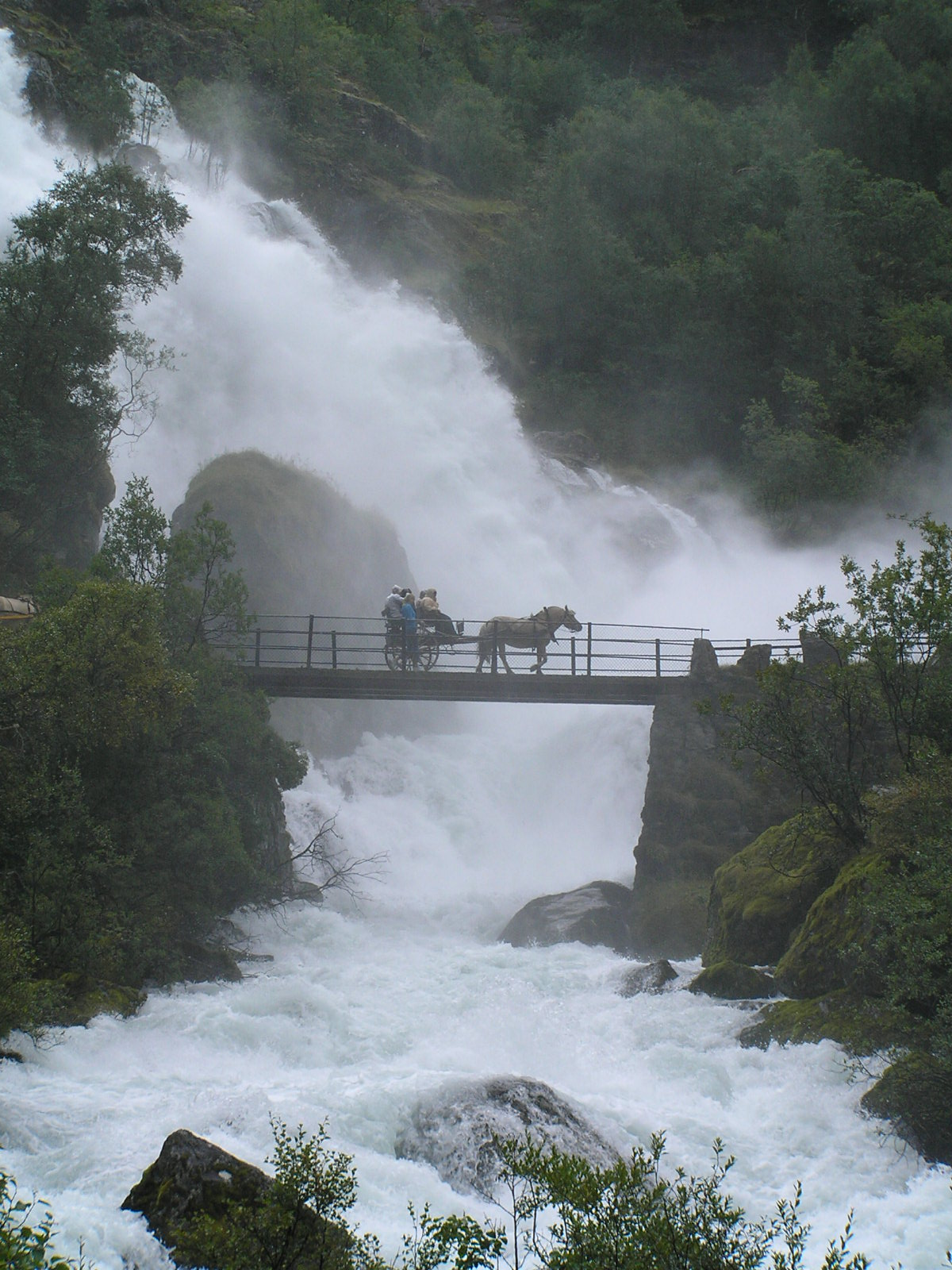
Road to the Jostedal Glacier

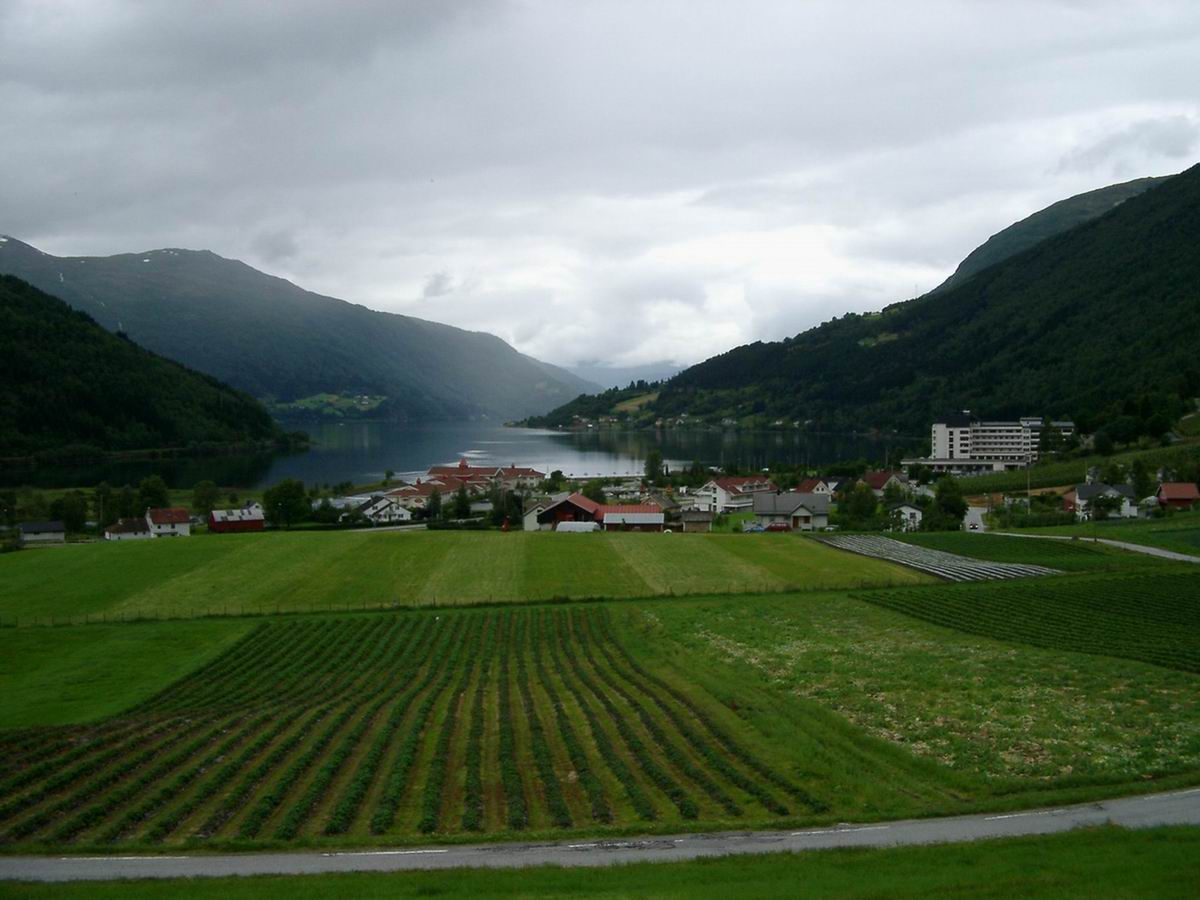
Loen

=== Location ===
Stryn Municipality is located on the northern border of Vestland county. To the north, Stryn Municipality is bordered by Volda Municipality and Stranda Municipality (in Møre og Romsdal county), to the east is Skjåk Municipality (in Innlandet county), to the southeast is Luster Municipality, to the southwest is Sunnfjord Municipality, and to the west is Gloppen Municipality and Stad Municipality.

=== Nature ===
Stryn Municipality is known for its scenery, glaciers and the mountains running into the mirroring fjords and lakes. The glacier Briksdalsbreen lies in the Oldedalen valley. The Stryn area also has several other valley glaciers, including Tindefjellsbreen, Tystigsbreen, and Myklebustbreen. Most of the valley glaciers in Stryn Municipality originate from the great Jostedal Glacier between the Nordfjord and Sogn areas.

Ramnefjellsfossen, the third-highest free-falling waterfall in the world, is located in the municipality. Stryn Municipality also has the largest linden forest in Northern Europe. The largest lakes are Oppstrynsvatnet, Lovatnet, and Oldevatnet. The highest point in the municipality is the 2,081.44-metre (6,828.9 ft) tall mountain Lodalskåpa, located on the border with Luster Municipality. The mountains Skåla and Høgstre Breakulen are also located in Stryn.

=== Jostedal Glacier National Park ===
The Jostedalsbreen National Park has an area of approximately 1,310 square kilometres (510 sq mi). The flora and fauna area is situated between the fjord and the glacier. The museum Jostedalsbreen National Park Center is located in Oppstryn.

=== Briksdal glacier ===
Visitors from all over the world come to see the Briksdalsbreen glacier outlet, which is situated amid waterfalls and high peaks. Briksdal glacier is a part of the Jostedal Glacier ice field, which is the largest glacier on the European mainland. The highest point of the glacier lies at 1,950 metres (6,400 ft) above sea level, and in some places it measures 400 metres (1,300 ft) in depth. It is located at the end of the Oldedalen valley.

=== Lodalen–Kjenndalen ===
On two occasions, large rockslides from Ramnefjellet hit the lake below. The resulting flood wave wiped out the settlements of Nesdal and Bødal, killing 135 people.

=== Wildlife ===
There are many bird species in this area including the golden eagle (Aquila chrysaetos), rough-legged buzzard (Buteo lagopus), and the white-backed woodpecker (Dendrocopus leucotos). Some of the larger mammals that live in this region are red deer (Cervus elaphus), wolverines (Gulo gulo), and lynxes (Lynx lynx).

== Climate ==
Most villages in the municipality are located along the water and have a marine mild winter climate (Cfb in the Köppen classification). Places at further from the water and at higher elevation have either a humid continental climate (Dfb) or a humid subartic climate (Dfc). The highest parts (above ca. 800 m) have a tundra climate.

Spring is usually the driest part of the year, with the months of April and May having the least precipitation. Snow cover is unreliable in the lower parts during the winter because of frequent mind-winter melting and rain-on-snow events. There is usually a reliable snow cover for most of the year in the mountains.

Climate data for Stryn - Kroken 1991–2020 (208 m)
Month	Jan	Feb	Mar	Apr	May	Jun	Jul	Aug	Sep	Oct	Nov	Dec	Year
Daily mean °C (°F)	−0.6 (30.9)	−1.0 (30.2)	0.7 (33.3)	4.5 (40.1)	8.5 (47.3)	12.0 (53.6)	14.7 (58.5)	13.6 (56.5)	10.1 (50.2)	5.1 (41.2)	2.0 (35.6)	−0.9 (30.4)	5.7 (42.3)
Average precipitation mm (inches)	190 (7.5)	150 (5.9)	165 (6.5)	87 (3.4)	72 (2.8)	85 (3.3)	95 (3.7)	109 (4.3)	151 (5.9)	170 (6.7)	181 (7.1)	206 (8.1)	1,661 (65.2)
Average precipitation days (≥ 1.0 mm)	17	16	16	11	11	13	14	15	15	16	15	18	177
Source: NOAA WMO averages 91-2020 Norway

Climate data for Innvik - Heggdal 1991–2020 (70 m)
Month	Jan	Feb	Mar	Apr	May	Jun	Jul	Aug	Sep	Oct	Nov	Dec	Year
Average precipitation mm (inches)	130.6 (5.14)	105.3 (4.15)	91.7 (3.61)	57.6 (2.27)	56.6 (2.23)	75.5 (2.97)	86.5 (3.41)	97.9 (3.85)	116.0 (4.57)	128.2 (5.05)	122.0 (4.80)	145.7 (5.74)	1,213.6 (47.79)
Average precipitation days (≥ 1.0 mm)	15	14	13	9	9	10	12	13	14	14	13	16	152
Source: NOAA WMO averages 91-2020 Norway

== Attractions ==
=== National Tourist Route ===
The Gamle Strynefjellsvegen is a National Tourist Route (Fylkesvei 258). It goes from Grotli (Skjåk Municipality in Innlandet county) to Videseter, where a waterfall is, and on to the village of Stryn (Vestland county).

=== Stryn Center ===
The village of Stryn, a busy and developing small town at the tip of the most northernly of the three short branches at the inner end of Nordfjorden, is the local government and shopping centre for a large community and the junction of roads which connect inner Nordfjord with the rest of Norway.

=== Oldedalen Valley ===
The southernmost of the three short branches at the inner end of Nordfjorden terminates at the village of Olden, from which a lovely valley, Oldedalen, goes due south for about 20 kilometres (12 mi) between slopes rising sharply to more than 1,700 metres (5,600 ft) to the edge of the Jostedal Glacier.

Olden has two churches. The Old Olden Church in the village was built in 1759 on the site of a Stave church dating from around 1300. Its pews, doors, and jambs are made from timbers of the Stave church. The "new" Olden Church, a short distance along the valley, was built in 1934 so that the old church could be preserved.

=== Loen and Lodalen Valley ===
The Loen Skylift is located in Loen, and Hotel Alexandra is a popular tourist retreat. Loen Valley (Lodalen) is a popular attraction, and the Kjenndal Glacier is located at the end of the valley (a branch of the Jostedal Glacier). Much of the upper Loen valley was devastated by two rockfall slides (one in 1905 and one in 1936) that generated huge waves that swept away most of the houses and vegetation. A total of 135 people were killed in these two incidents.

=== Innvik and Utvik ===
On the southern shore of the Nordfjorden, between Hildaneset and Utvikfjellet, lie the villages of Innvik and Utvik, in the area known as Vikane. The main road (Rv 60) skirts the fjord past Innvik and ascends from Utvik to Utvikfjellet mountain. At Hildaneset, beside the main road, there is a sculpture of Mr. Singer. Mr Singer financed the building of the road.

== Notable people ==
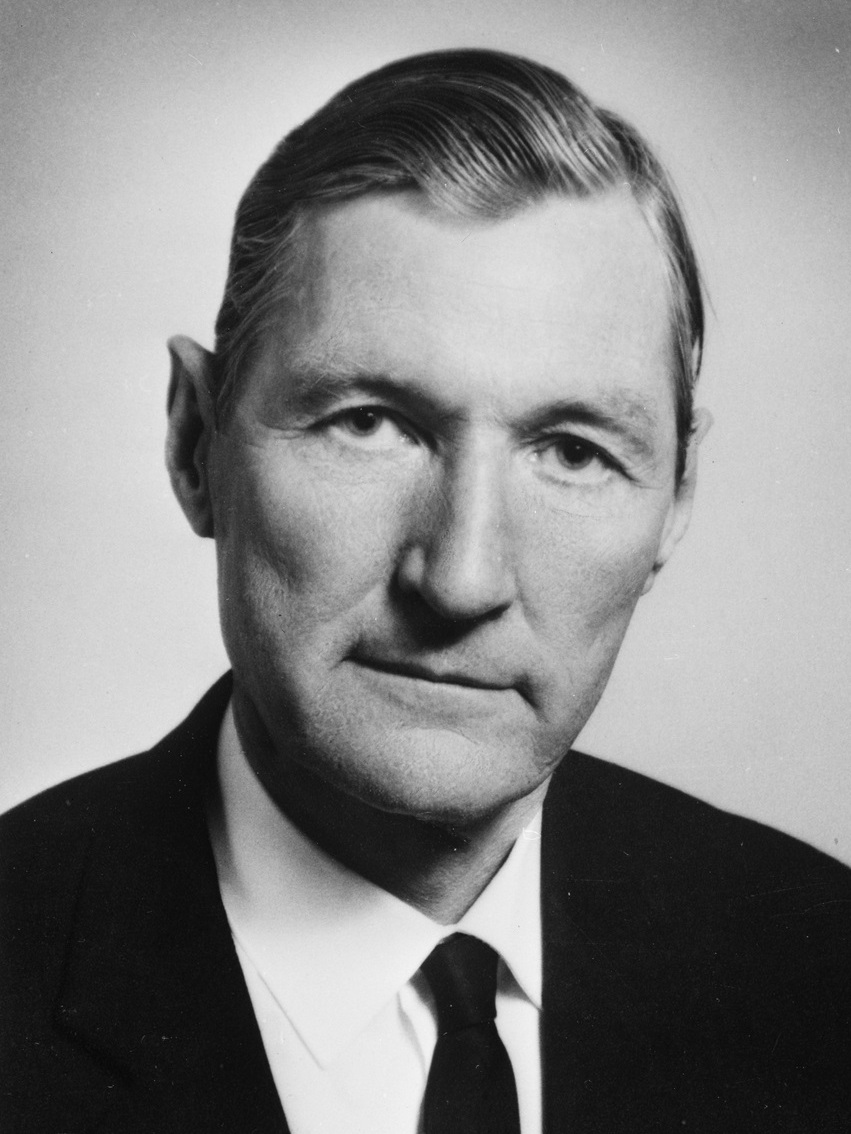
Johs. Andenæs

- Alf Torp (1853 in Stryn – 1916), a philologist and author
- Jacob Aaland (1865 in Randabygda – 1950), a teacher, local historian, and government scholar
- Thoralf Klouman (1890 in Innvik – 1940), a satirical illustrator and actor
- Johannes Andenæs (1912 in Innvik – 2003), a distinguished Norwegian jurist and academic
- Inge Fænn (born 1945 in Markane), an editor, journalist, and author

=== Sport ===
- Per Knut Aaland (born 1954 in Randabygda), a retired cross-country skier and team silver medallist at the 1980 Winter Olympics
- brothers Kjell Rune Flo (born 1961), Jostein Flo (born 1964), Jarle Flo (born 1970), Tore André Flo (born 1973) and cousins Håvard Flo (born 1970), Per-Egil Flo (born 1989) and nephew Ulrik Flo (born 1988), footballers from Flo and Stryn
- Mats Solheim (born 1987 in Loen), a footballer with over 320 club caps
- brothers Tarjei Bø (born 1988 in Stryn) and Johannes Thingnes Bø (born 1993 in Stryn), biathletes, gold medallists, and twice team silver medallists at the 2010, 2018, and 2022 Winter Olympics.
- Maren Kirkeeide (born 2003 in Stryn), a biathlete, gold medallist at the 2026 Winter Olympics
