= Stryn Sommerski =

Ski resort in Norway

- Location in Norway
- Location: Stryn Municipality, Vestland, Norway
- Nearest city: Stryn: 45 km (28 mi)
- Coordinates: 61.955°N 7.36°E
- Vertical: 540 m (1,770 ft)
- Top elevation: 1,640 m (5,380 ft)
- Base elevation: 185 m (607 ft)
- Trails: 6 pistes, 6 km (3.7 mi): 0 nursery - (green); 2 beginner - (blue); 2 intermediate - (red); 0 advanced - (black)
- Longest run: 3 km (1.9 mi)
- Lift system: 2 total: 1 chairlifts; 1 T-bars
- Terrain parks: 2
- Snowfall: high
- Website: Strynsommerski.com

Stryn Sommerski (English: Stryn Summer Ski Centre) is a ski resort in Stryn Municipality, Norway. The ski resort is located along the 100-year-old national tourist route, Gamle Strynefjellsvegen (English: The Old Stryn Mountain Road), about 45 kilometres (28 mi) east of the village of Stryn. From Oslo Airport, Gardermoen, it is about a five-hour drive to the north.

The ski resort opened in 1972 and is the largest summer ski area in Northern Europe. It is based near an arm of the glacier Jostedalsbreen but the skiing area is mainly outside the glacier. The extreme amount of snow fall in winter time makes an average snow depth per June 1 of 6 m (20 ft)

Stryn Sommerski is home to 5 km (3.1 mi) prepared alpine slopes, a first class terrain park and 4 km (2.5 mi) of cross-country pistes.
