= Randabygda =

Village in Stryn Municipality, Norway

Randabygda Hopland
- Village
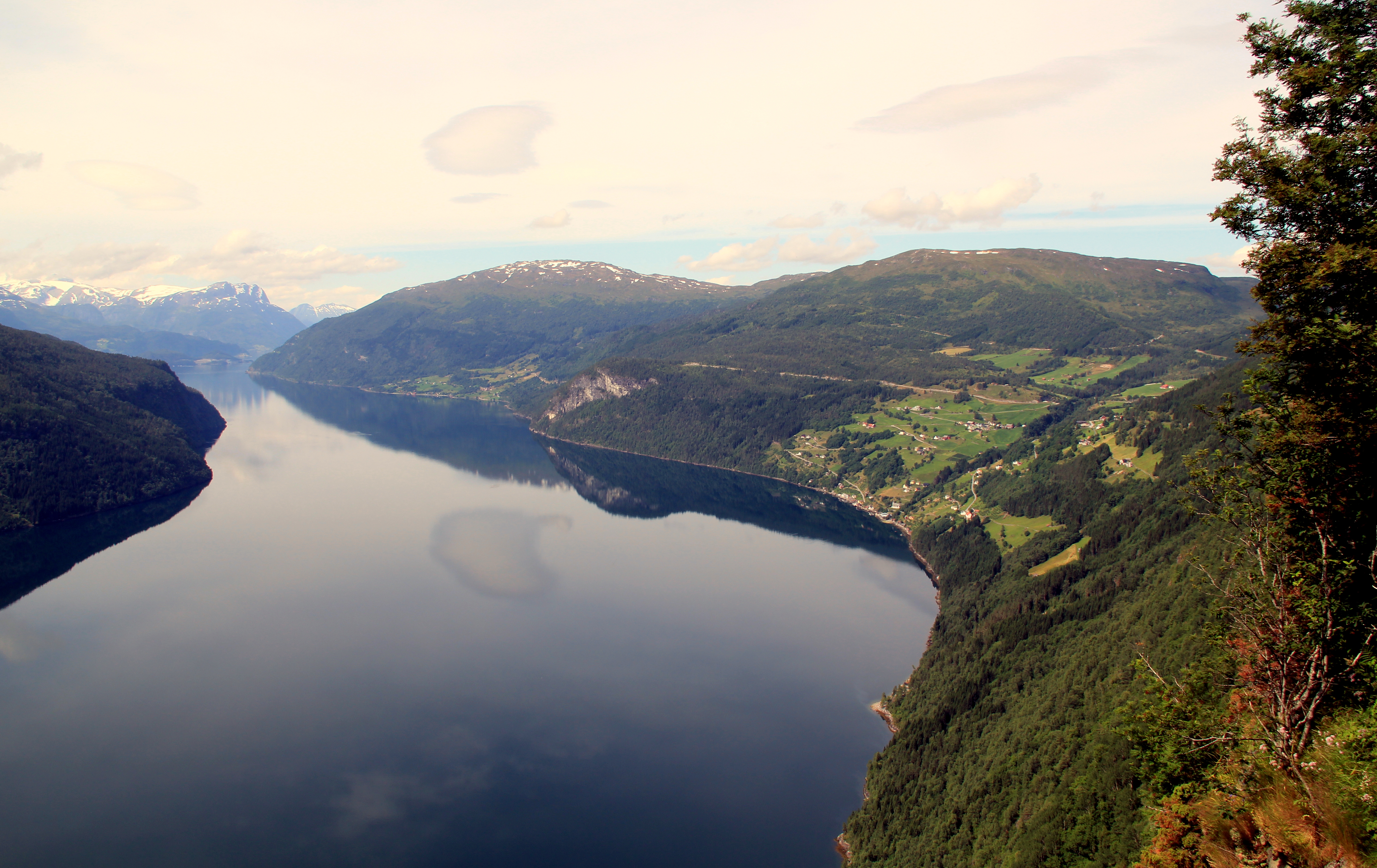
- View of the village
- Interactive map of Randabygda; Hopland
- Location within Vestland Location within Norway
- Coordinates: 61.8672°N 6.3283°E
- Country: Norway
- Region: Western Norway
- County: Vestland
- District: Nordfjord
- Municipality: Stryn Municipality
- Elevation: 234 m (768 ft)
- Time zone: UTC+01:00 (CET)
  - Summer (DST): UTC+02:00 (CEST)
- Post Code: 6796 Hopland

Randabygda or Hopland is a village in Stryn Municipality in Vestland county, Norway. The village is located on the northern shore of the Nordfjorden on a rather steep sloping area along the fjord. The village lies about 15 kilometres (9.3 mi) east of the village of Lote (in the neighboring Stad Municipality) and about 15 kilometres (9.3 mi) west of the village of Roset. Randabygd Church is located in this village. The village is divided by the river Hoplandselva, where Hopland lies to the west and Randabygda lies to the east.
