= Hornindal =

Hornindal may refer to:

== Places ==
- Hornindal Municipality, a former municipality in Sogn og Fjordane county, Norway
- Grodås (also known as Hornindal), a village in Volda Municipality in Møre og Romsdal county, Norway
- Hornindal Church, a church (and geographical parish) in Volda Municipality in Møre og Romsdal county, Norway
- Hornindalsvatnet (or Lake Hornindal), a lake in Møre og Romsdal and Vestland counties in Norway

== Sports ==
- Hornindal IL, a sports club based in Volda Municipality in Møre og Romsdal county, Norway
- Hornindal Rundt, an annual marathon held in Volda Municipality in Møre og Romsdal county, Norway
