= Hornindal Municipality =

Former municipality in Sogn og Fjordane county, Norway

Hornindal Municipality Hornindal kommune
- Former municipality
- Hornindalen herred (historic name)
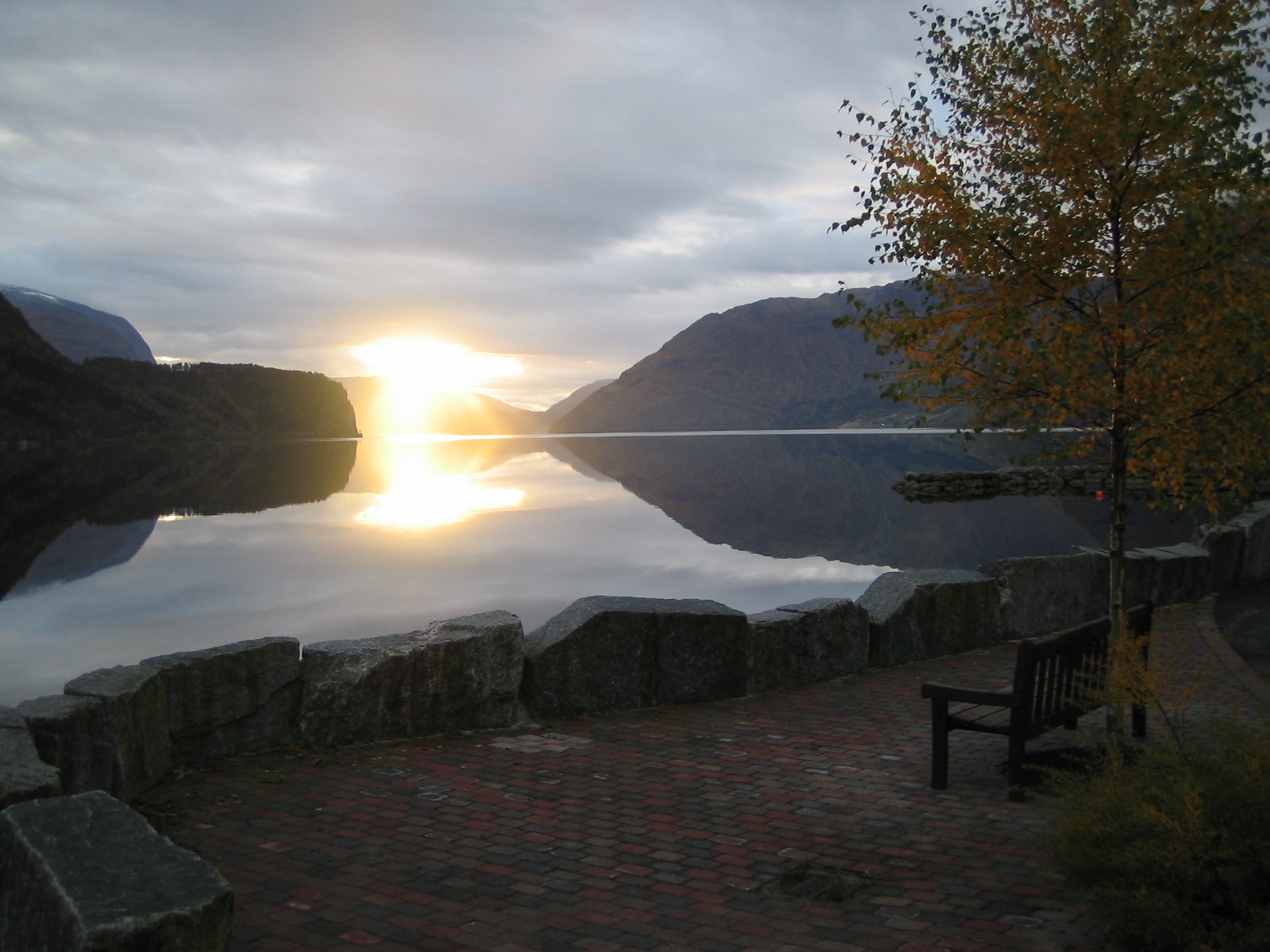
- View of the lake Hornindalsvatnet

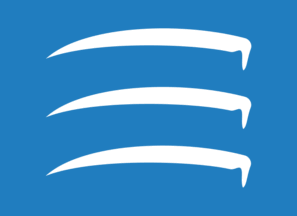
- Flag Coat of arms

- Sogn og Fjordane within Norway

- Hornindal within Sogn og Fjordane
- Coordinates: 61°59′55″N 06°35′03″E
- Country: Norway
- County: Sogn og Fjordane
- District: Nordfjord
- Established: 1 Jan 1867
  - Preceded by: Eid Municipality
- Disestablished: 1 Jan 1965
  - Succeeded by: Stryn Municipality
- Re-established: 1 Jan 1977
  - Preceded by: Stryn Municipality
- Disestablished: 1 Jan 2020
  - Succeeded by: Volda Municipality
- Administrative centre: Grodås

Government
  - Mayor (2015-2019): Stig Olav Lødemel (H)

Area (upon dissolution)
  - Total: 186.78 km^{2} (72.12 sq mi)
  - Land: 173.64 km^{2} (67.04 sq mi)
  - Water: 13.14 km^{2} (5.07 sq mi) 7%
  - Rank: #336 in Norway
- Highest elevation: 1,527.3 m (5,011 ft)

Population (2019)
  - Total: 1,152
  - Rank: #382 in Norway
  - Density: 6.2/km^{2} (16/sq mi)
  - Change (10 years): ▼ −5.8%
- Demonym: Horndøl

Official language
  - Norwegian form: Nynorsk
- Time zone: UTC+01:00 (CET)
  - Summer (DST): UTC+02:00 (CEST)
- ISO 3166 code: NO-1444

Hornindal is a former municipality in Sogn og Fjordane county, Norway. The 187-square-kilometre (72 sq mi) municipality existed from 1867 until 1965 and then again from 1977 until its dissolution in 2020. It was located in the traditional district of Nordfjord. The area is now part of Volda Municipality in Møre og Romsdal county. The administrative centre was the village of Grodås. The municipality was located at the eastern end of the lake Hornindalsvatnet, the deepest lake in Northern Europe. The rest of the lake lies inside neighboring Eid Municipality.

Prior to its dissolution in 2020, the 187-square-kilometre (72 sq mi) municipality was the 336th largest by area out of the 422 municipalities in Norway. Hornindal Municipality was the 382nd most populous municipality in Norway with a population of about 1,152. The municipality's population density was 7 inhabitants per square kilometre (18/sq mi) and its population had decreased by 5.8% over the previous 10-year period.

The European route E39 highway passed through Hornindal Municipality as it made its way along the western coast of Norway. The Kviven Tunnel was completed in 2012 as part of the new E39 route connecting Hornindal to Volda Municipality in Møre og Romsdal county to the north. The tunnel was constructed to avoid the ferry crossing over the Voldsfjorden and it shortened the distance from Hornindal to Volda significantly.

== General information ==
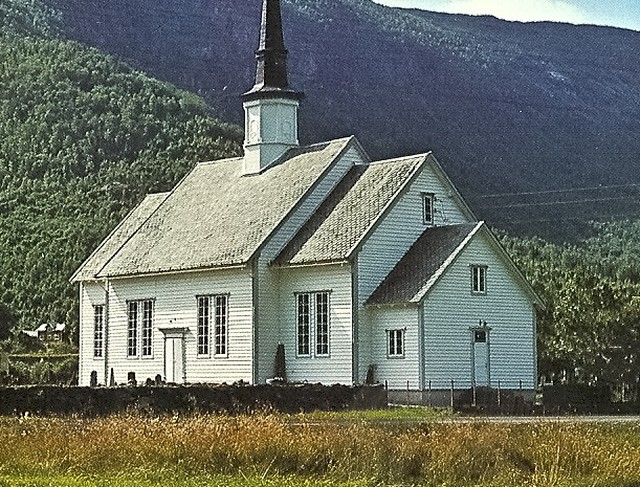
Hornindal Church

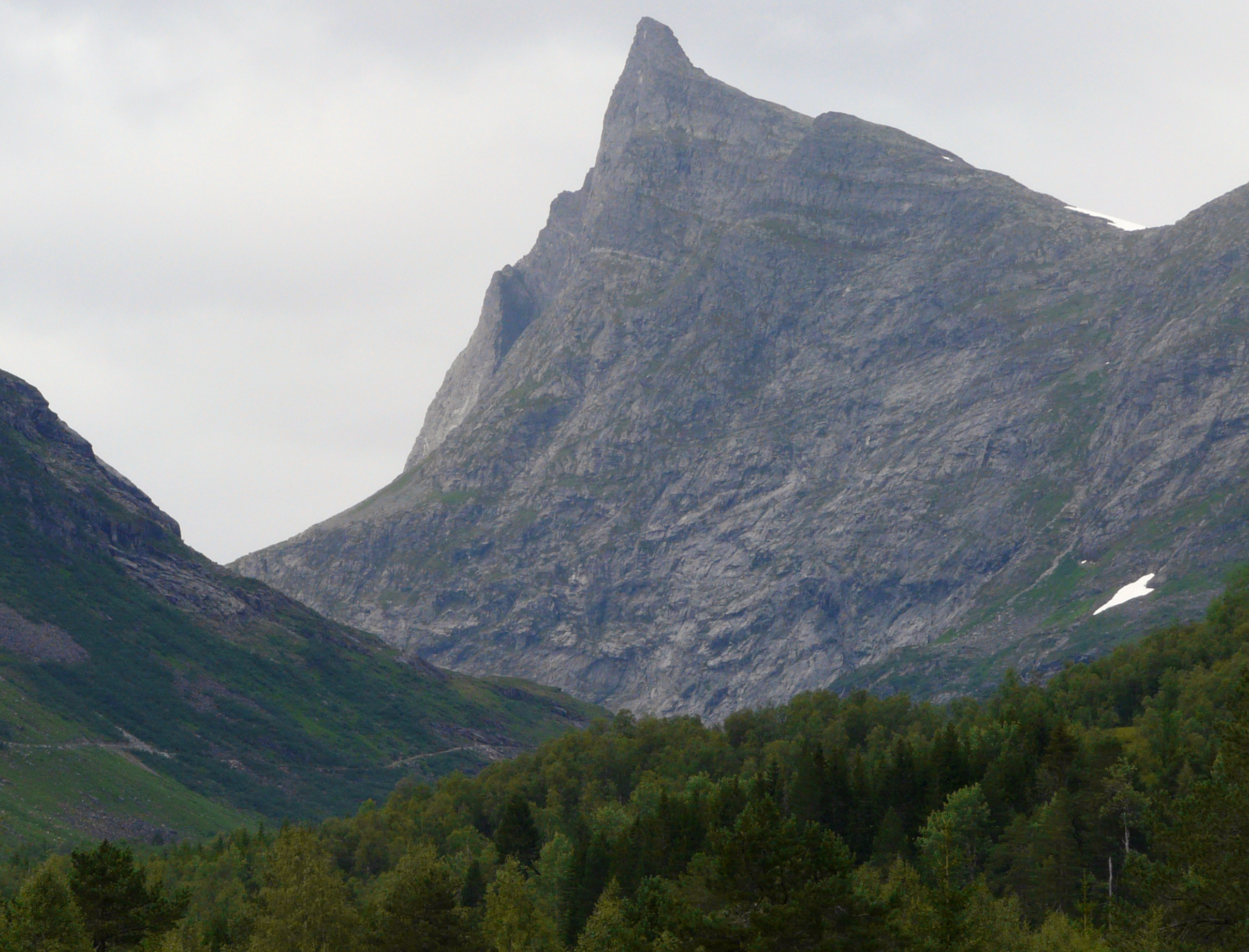
View of the Hornindalsrokken mountain

Since ancient times, Hornindal was a sub-parish (sokn) of the Eid prestegjeld (see formannskapsdistrikt law). In 1865, Hornindal became a separate Church of Norway parish. On 1 January 1867, Eid Municipality was divided into two: the eastern part (population: 1,612) became the new Hornindal Municipality and the western part (population: 2,918) remained as (a smaller) Eid Municipality.

During the 1960s, there were many municipal mergers across Norway due to the work of the Schei Committee. On 1 January 1965, Hornindal Municipality was dissolved and its lands were divided. The villages of Navelsaker and Holmøyvik and all of the old Hornindal Municipality located west of those villages (population: 310) was transferred to Eid Municipality. The eastern part of the old Hornindal Municipality (population: 1,184) became part of Stryn Municipality.

The dissolution of Hornindal Municipality was not long-lasting due to discontent among the population. On 1 January 1977, the area of the old Hornindal Municipality that had joined Stryn Municipality in 1965 (population: 1,202) was separated from Styrn and recreated as a separate Hornindal Municipality once again. The portions of the old Hornindal Municipality that were merged into Eid Municipality in 1965 remained a part of Eid Municipality.

On 1 January 2019, the Maurset area in southern Hornindal Municipality (population: 19) was transferred to the neighboring Stryn Municipality.

On 1 January 2020, all of Hornindal Municipality (in Sogn og Fjordane county) merged with the neighboring Volda Municipality and became part of Møre og Romsdal county.

=== Name ===
The municipality (originally the parish) is named after the local Hornindalen valley since that is the location of the municipality. The first element of the name comes from the old Horne farm (Old Norse: Hornyn) since the first Hornindal Church was built there. The name is likely a combination of two old words. The first part is horn which means "horn", likely referring to the shape of a mountain behind the farm. The last part is vin which means "meadow" or "pasture". The last element of the name is dalr which means "valley" or "dale". Thus, the name means the "valley of Horne". Historically, the name of the municipality was spelled Hornindalen. On 3 November 1917, a royal resolution changed the spelling of the name of the municipality to Hornindal, removing the definite form ending -en.

=== Coat of arms ===
The coat of arms was granted on 7 August 1987 and it was in use until 1 January 2020 when the municipality was dissolved. The official blazon is "Azure, three scythe blades fesswise in pale argent" (Norwegian: På blå grunn tre sølv ljåblad, 1-1-1). This means the arms have a blue field (background) and the charge is a set of three horizontal scythe blades stacked one over the other. Each scythe blade has a tincture of argent which means it is commonly colored white, but if it is made out of metal, then silver is used. Historically, farming and blacksmithing were vital industries in Hornindal. At one point, there were as many as 200 blacksmiths in the area. There was also a rich tradition of making handmade scythes and this was honored by its placement on the coat of arms. The arms were designed by Petter Eide. The municipal flag has the same design as the coat of arms.

=== Churches ===
The Church of Norway had one parish (sokn) within Hornindal Municipality. It is part of the Nordfjord prosti (deanery) in the Diocese of Bjørgvin.

Churches in Hornindal
Parish (sokn)	Church name	Location of the church	Year built
Hornindal	Hornindal Church	Grodås	1856

== Government ==
While it existed, Hornindal Municipality was responsible for primary education (through 10th grade), outpatient health services, senior citizen services, welfare and other social services, zoning, economic development, and municipal roads and utilities. The municipality was governed by a municipal council of directly elected representatives. The mayor was indirectly elected by a vote of the municipal council. The municipality was under the jurisdiction of the Sogn og Fjordane District Court and the Gulating Court of Appeal.

=== Municipal council ===
The municipal council (Kommunestyre) of Hornindal Municipality was made up of 17 representatives that were elected to four-year terms. The tables below show the historical composition of the council by political party.

Hornindal kommunestyre 2015–2019
Party name (in Nynorsk)	Number of representatives
Labour Party (Arbeidarpartiet)	4
Conservative Party (Høgre)	5
Centre Party (Senterpartiet)	6
Liberal Party (Venstre)	2
Total number of members:	17
Note: On 1 January 2020, Hornindal Municipality became part of Volda Municipality.

Hornindal kommunestyre 2011–2015
Party name (in Nynorsk)	Number of representatives
Labour Party (Arbeidarpartiet)	2
Conservative Party (Høgre)	6
Centre Party (Senterpartiet)	6
Liberal Party (Venstre)	3
Total number of members:	17

Hornindal kommunestyre 2007–2011
Party name (in Nynorsk)	Number of representatives
Labour Party (Arbeidarpartiet)	3
Conservative Party (Høgre)	6
Centre Party (Senterpartiet)	4
Liberal Party (Venstre)	4
Total number of members:	17

Hornindal kommunestyre 2003–2007
Party name (in Nynorsk)	Number of representatives
Labour Party (Arbeidarpartiet)	3
Conservative Party (Høgre)	5
Centre Party (Senterpartiet)	7
Liberal Party (Venstre)	2
Total number of members:	17

Hornindal kommunestyre 1999–2003
Party name (in Nynorsk)	Number of representatives
Labour Party (Arbeidarpartiet)	3
Conservative Party (Høgre)	6
Centre Party (Senterpartiet)	6
Liberal Party (Venstre)	2
Total number of members:	17

Hornindal kommunestyre 1995–1999
Party name (in Nynorsk)	Number of representatives
Labour Party (Arbeidarpartiet)	3
Conservative Party (Høgre)	4
Centre Party (Senterpartiet)	7
Liberal Party (Venstre)	3
Total number of members:	17

Hornindal kommunestyre 1991–1995
Party name (in Nynorsk)	Number of representatives
Labour Party (Arbeidarpartiet)	3
Conservative Party (Høgre)	3
Centre Party (Senterpartiet)	7
Liberal Party (Venstre)	3
Total number of members:	17

Hornindal kommunestyre 1987–1991
Party name (in Nynorsk)	Number of representatives
Labour Party (Arbeidarpartiet)	4
Conservative Party (Høgre)	3
Centre Party (Senterpartiet)	6
Liberal Party (Venstre)	3
Local list for Kjøs area (Grendaliste for Kjøs krins)	1
Total number of members:	17

Hornindal kommunestyre 1983–1987
Party name (in Nynorsk)	Number of representatives
Labour Party (Arbeidarpartiet)	4
Conservative Party (Høgre)	3
Centre Party (Senterpartiet)	6
Liberal Party (Venstre)	4
Total number of members:	17

Hornindal kommunestyre 1979–1983
Party name (in Nynorsk)	Number of representatives
Labour Party (Arbeidarpartiet)	4
Conservative Party (Høgre)	3
Centre Party (Senterpartiet)	6
Common list for Hornindal (Samlingslista for Hornindal)	4
Total number of members:	17
Note: On 1 January 1977, Hornindal Municipality was separated from Stryn Municipality.

Hornindal kommunestyre 1963–1964
Party name (in Nynorsk)	Number of representatives
Labour Party (Arbeidarpartiet)	4
Centre Party (Senterpartiet)	6
Liberal Party (Venstre)	5
Local List(s) (Lokale lister)	2
Total number of members:	17
Note: On 1 January 1965, Hornindal Municipality was divided between Eid Municipality and Stryn Municipality.

Hornindal heradsstyre 1959–1963
Party name (in Nynorsk)	Number of representatives
Labour Party (Arbeidarpartiet)	5
Liberal Party (Venstre)	3
Joint List(s) of Non-Socialist Parties (Borgarlege Felleslister)	5
Local List(s) (Lokale lister)	4
Total number of members:	17

Hornindal heradsstyre 1955–1959
Party name (in Nynorsk)	Number of representatives
Labour Party (Arbeidarpartiet)	6
Conservative Party (Høgre)	1
Farmers' Party (Bondepartiet)	5
Liberal Party (Venstre)	2
Local List(s) (Lokale lister)	3
Total number of members:	17

Hornindal heradsstyre 1951–1955
Party name (in Nynorsk)	Number of representatives
Labour Party (Arbeidarpartiet)	4
Liberal Party (Venstre)	3
Local List(s) (Lokale lister)	9
Total number of members:	16

Hornindal heradsstyre 1947–1951
Party name (in Nynorsk)	Number of representatives
Labour Party (Arbeidarpartiet)	3
Liberal Party (Venstre)	4
Local List(s) (Lokale lister)	9
Total number of members:	16

Hornindal heradsstyre 1945–1947
Party name (in Nynorsk)	Number of representatives
Liberal Party (Venstre)	4
List of workers, fishermen, and small farmholders (Arbeidarar, fiskarar, småbrukarar liste)	5
Local List(s) (Lokale lister)	7
Total number of members:	16

Hornindal heradsstyre 1937–1941*
Party name (in Nynorsk)	Number of representatives
Labour Party (Arbeidarpartiet)	3
Joint List(s) of Non-Socialist Parties (Borgarlege Felleslister)	5
Local List(s) (Lokale lister)	8
Total number of members:	16
Note: Due to the German occupation of Norway during World War II, no elections were held for new municipal councils until after the war ended in 1945.

=== Mayors ===
The mayor (Nynorsk: ordfører) of Hjørundfjord Municipality was the political leader of the municipality and the chairperson of the municipal council. The following people have held this position:

- 1867–1885: Knut Kirkhorn
- 1885–1887: Rasmus Rognnes
- 1888–1902: Amund Tomasgard
- 1902–1913: Ola R. Svor
- 1914–1916: Anton Johnson
- 1917–1919: Ola R. Svor
- 1920–1922: Lars N. Gausemel
- 1923–1925: Paul K. Kirkhorn
- 1926–1928: Lars N. Gausemel
- 1929–1940: Jakob Gausemel
- 1940–1942: Ivar Melheim
- 1942–1945: Oliver Fagerheim (NS)
- 1945–1955: Ivar Melheim
- 1956–1964: Kåre Maurset
- (1965–1976: Merged with Stryn Municipality)
- 1977–1977: Kåre Maurset (LL)
- 1978–1981: Paul O. Tomasgard (Sp)
- 1982–1983: Rasmus Otterdal (H)
- 1984–1987: Atle Tomasgard (V)
- 1988–1991: Jon Indredavik (Ap)
- 1993–1999: Ola Are Ytrehorn (Sp)
- 1999–2009: Bjørn Lødemel (H)
- 2009–2011: Edvin Haugen (H)
- 2011–2015: Anne-Britt Øen Nygård (Sp)
- 2015–2019: Stig Olav Lødemel (H)

== Geography ==
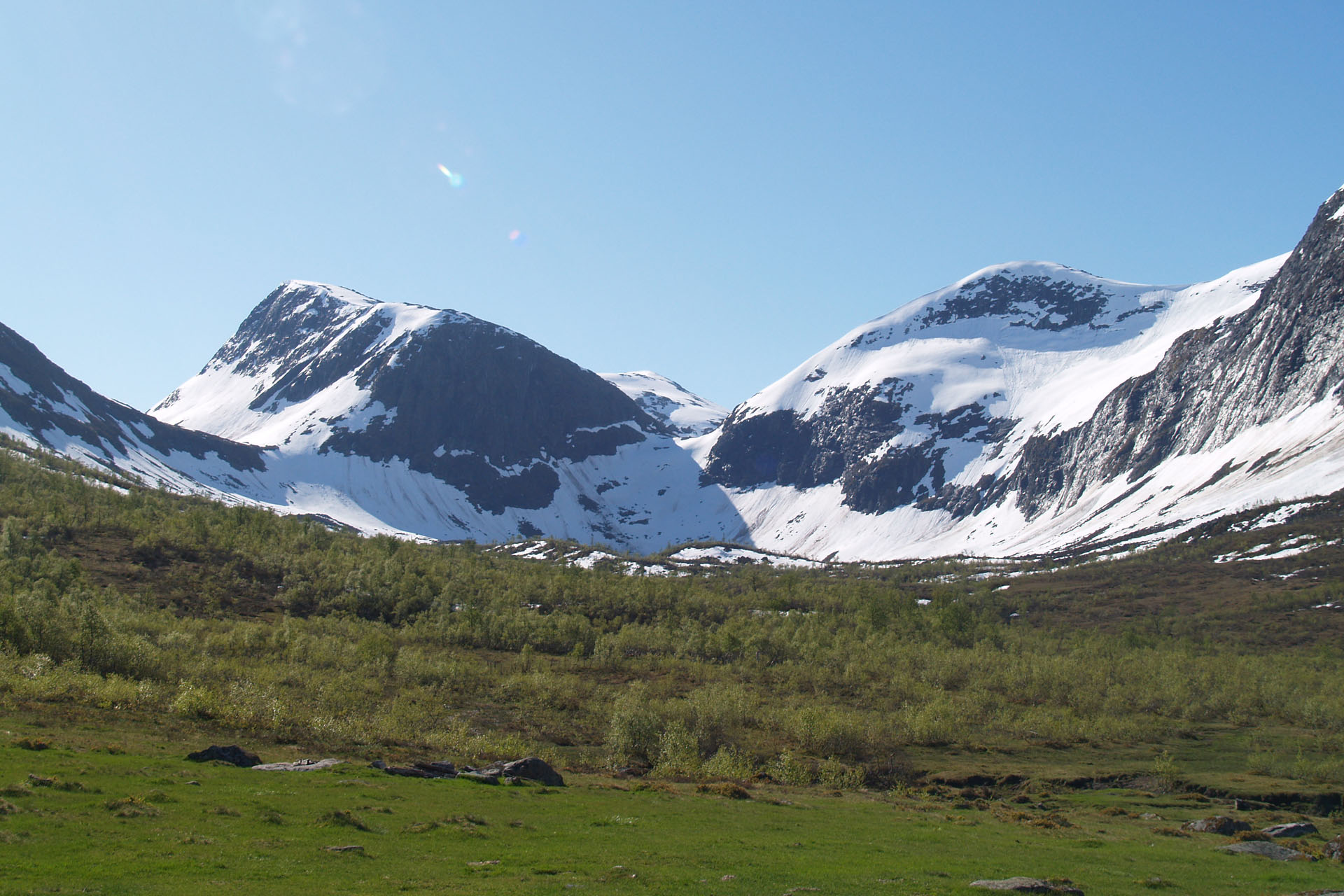
View of Steindalsegga

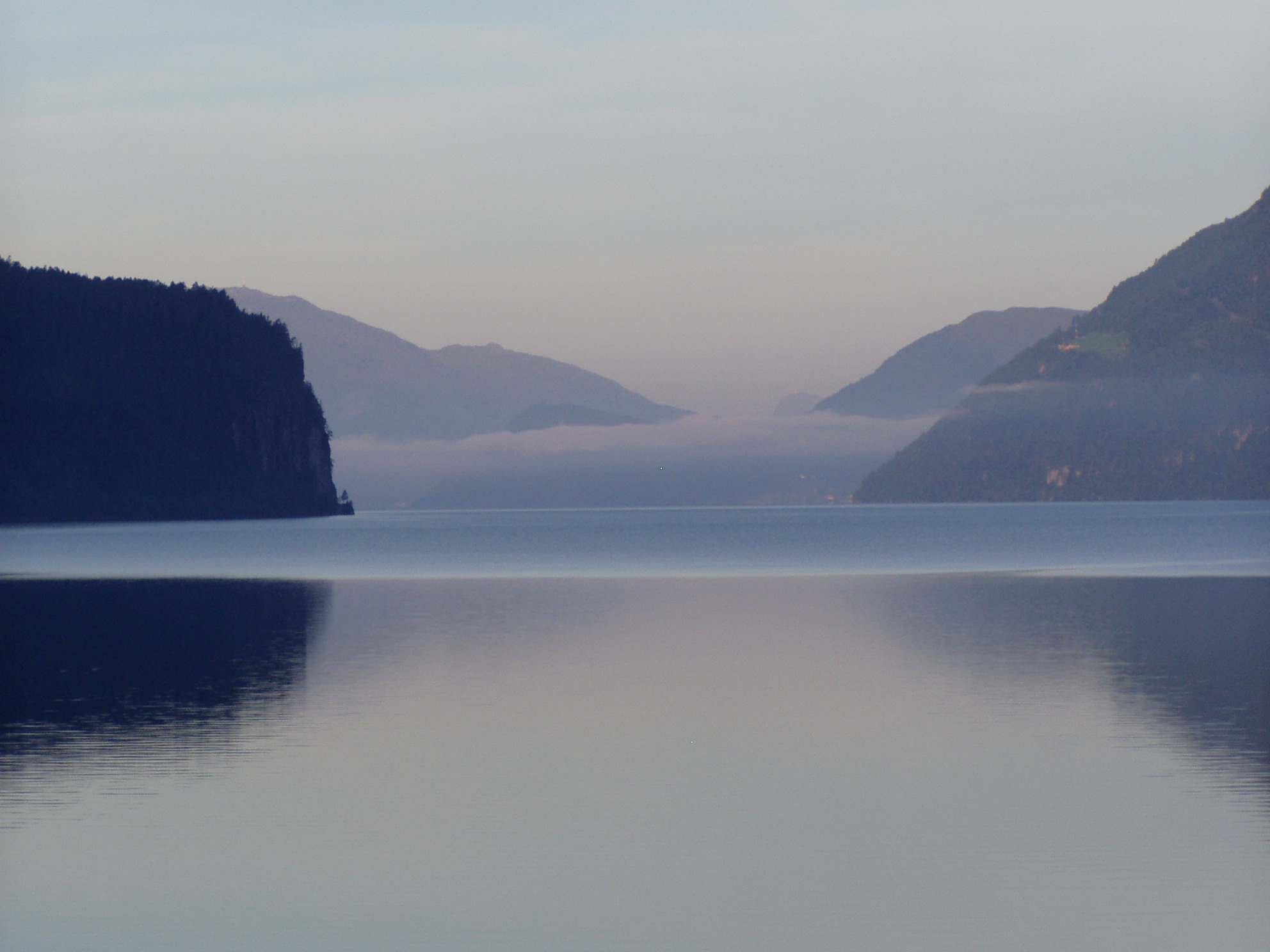
Hornindal

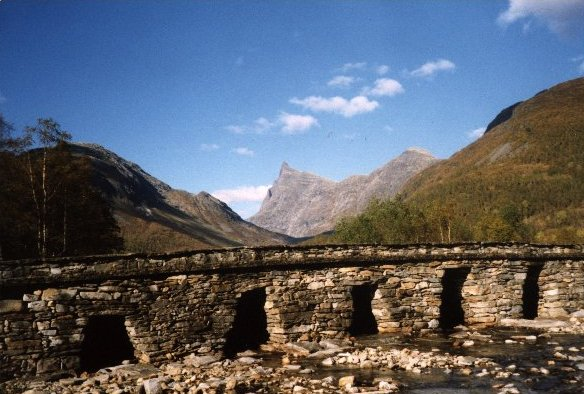
The mountain Hornindalsrokken and Honndøla bridge

=== Location ===
Hornindal is located on the northern border of Sogn og Fjordane county. Hornindal is bordered to the west by Eid Municipality, to the south by Stryn Municipality, to the east by Stranda Municipality (in Møre og Romsdal county), and to the north by Ørsta Municipality and Volda Municipality (both in Møre og Romsdal county).

=== Mountains ===
The highest point in the municipality was the 1,527-metre (5,010 ft) tall mountain Hornindalsrokken. Other notable mountains include: Gulkoppen (1,304 metres or 4,278 feet) and Middagsfjellet (903 metres or 2,963 feet).

== Tourist attractions ==
=== Hornindalsvatnet ===
The Hornindalsvatnet lake is the deepest lake in Europe at 514 metres (1,686 ft) deep. None of the glacier streams run out into the lake and this has resulted in one of Europe's clearest lakes.

=== Anders Svor Museum ===
Anders Svor was born in 1864 on the Svor Farm in Hornindal. At the age of 21 he left for Denmark where he enrolled at the Copenhagen Academy of Art. He later participated in many art exhibitions in Kristiania, Copenhagen, Paris, and Chicago. The Anders Svor Museum was opened in 1953 and features 450 of his works. His art is characterised by simple, clean lines, and deep authenticity.

== Notable people ==
- Anders Fannemel (born 1991), a ski jumper
- Frode Grodås (born 1964), a footballer
- Bjørn Lødemel (born 1958), a politician
- Brita Lund (1886–1966), an artist
- Anders Svor (1864–1929), a sculptor
