= Inge Fænn =

Norwegian editor, journalist, and author

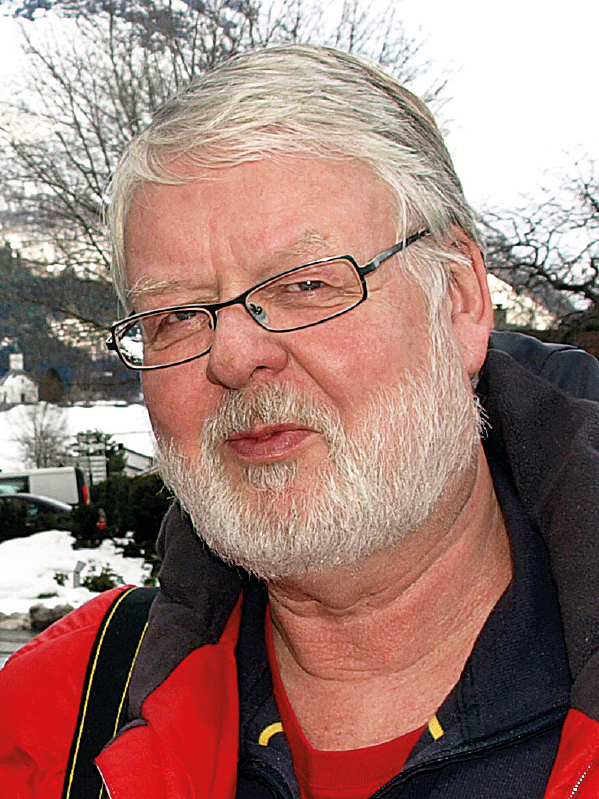
- Born: 1945 (age 79–80)
- Occupation(s): Editor, journalist, author

Inge Fænn (born 1945) is a Norwegian editor, journalist, and author. He is from Markane in Stryn Municipality. Fænn worked as a journalist for the newspaper Fjordingen and he managed the branch office for the newspaper Sunnmørsposten in Stryn before serving as the editor of Fjordingen from 1996 to 2005.

Fænn was a member of the main committee for the Norwegian Skiing Championship in Stryn in 1996, and he served as the head of the Sogn og Fjordane Skiing Association (Norwegian: Sogn og Fjordane Skikrins).

Fænn has coauthored books on the Hotel Alexandra and the soccer player Tore André Flo (Flo United), and in 2005 he published 40 år med buss frå Vest (40 Years with Buses from Vest). He is also the coauthor of the book Skåla – fjellet og folket (Skåla: The Mountain and the People, 2011). In 2014 he published the book Anders Svor. Bilethoggaren frå Hornindal (Anders Svor. The Sculptor from Hornindal).

== Bibliography ==
- 1997: Alexandra: familiehotell sidan 1884 (Alexandra: A Family Hotel since 1884). Loen: Hotel Alexandra. ISBN 82-994521-0-4 (coauthored with Charles Harvey)
- 1999: Flo United: et norsk eventyr (Flo United: a Norwegian Fairy Tale). Oslo: Aschehoug. ISBN 82-03-22322-2 I fulltekst ved nb.no (coauthored with Odd Myklebust)
- 2005: 40 år med buss frå Vest (40 Years with Buses from Vest). Stryn: Vest-busscar AS.
- 2011: Skåla: fjellet og folket (Skåla: The Mountain and the People). Førde: Selja. ISBN 978-82-8240-038-1 (coauthored with Stig Roger Eide)
- 2014: Anders Svor : bilethoggaren frå Hornindal (Anders Svor. The Sculptor from Hornindal). Førde: Selja. ISBN 978-82-8240-084-8
