= Heggjabygda Church =

Church in Vestland, Norway

- Heggjabygda kyrkje
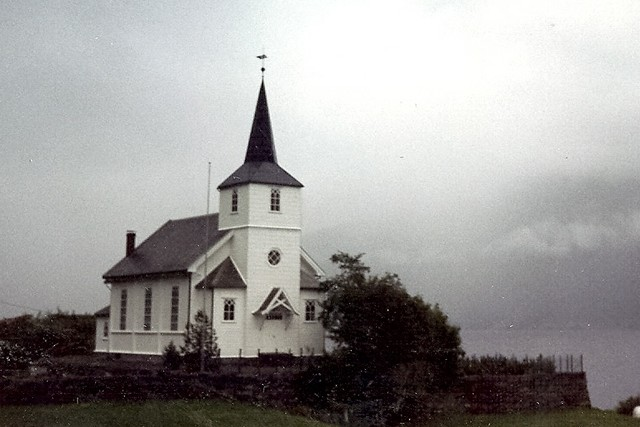
- View of the church
- Heggjabygda Church
- 61°56′06″N 6°16′00″E
- Location: Stad Municipality, Vestland
- Country: Norway
- Denomination: Church of Norway
- Churchmanship: Evangelical Lutheran

History
- Status: Parish church
- Founded: 1936
- Consecrated: 21 Oct 1936

Architecture
- Functional status: Active
- Architect: Anders Karlsen
- Architectural type: Long church
- Completed: 1936 (90 years ago)

Specifications
- Capacity: 200
- Materials: Wood

Administration
- Diocese: Bjørgvin bispedømme
- Deanery: Nordfjord prosti
- Parish: Eid
- Norwegian Cultural Heritage Site
- Type: Church
- Status: Not protected
- ID: 84520

Heggjabygda Church (Norwegian: Heggjabygda kyrkje) is a parish church of the Church of Norway in Stad Municipality in Vestland county, Norway. It is located in the village of Heggjabygda. It is the church for the Eid parish which is part of the Nordfjord prosti (deanery) in the Diocese of Bjørgvin. The white, wooden church was built in a long church design in 1936 using plans drawn up by the architect Anders Karlsen. The church seats about 200 people.

== History ==
The people of Heggjabygda were historically part of the Hornindal Church parish. Being located on the opposite side of the large lake Hornindalsvatnet, the area was quite remote. In 1913, the parish priest asked permission from the diocese to build a cemetery at Heggjabygda. In 1918 the cemetery was built. Soon after, there was a local desire to build a chapel by the cemetery. Fundraising work began soon after, but it took several years to raise the money. The parish hired the architect Anders Karlsen to design the chapel and they hired Ivar O. Melheim to be the lead builder. Construction began in 1934. It is said that the villagers provided the stone and the timber for the construction. The church was consecrated on 21 October 1936. In 1964, the Heggjabygda area was transferred to Eid Municipality and prestegjeld. In 1997, the chapel was upgraded to that of a parish church and it became part of the Eid parish (sokn).

== See also ==
- List of churches in Bjørgvin
