= Anders Svor =

Norwegian sculptor

- Born: December 14, 1864; Hornindal, Norway
- Died: May 2, 1929 (aged 64); Oslo, Norway
- Body discovered: May 6, 1929
- Burial place: Hornindal Church
- Occupation: Sculptor

Anders Svor (December 14, 1864 – May 2, 1929) was a Norwegian sculptor. He was a realist influenced by Romanticism, and Auguste Rodin was also an important inspiration. His work was also part of the sculpture event in the art competition at the 1924 Summer Olympics.

== Life ==
Svor was a farmer's son, the child of Rasmus Kristofer Svor (1835–1914) and Ragnhild Svor née Seljeset (1834–1902). He was born and raised at the Svor farm, just outside Grodås in Eid Municipality (later part of Hornindal Municipality, and since 2020, part of Volda Municipality). Already as a boy he showed unusual abilities in wood carving, which would be the start of his artist life.

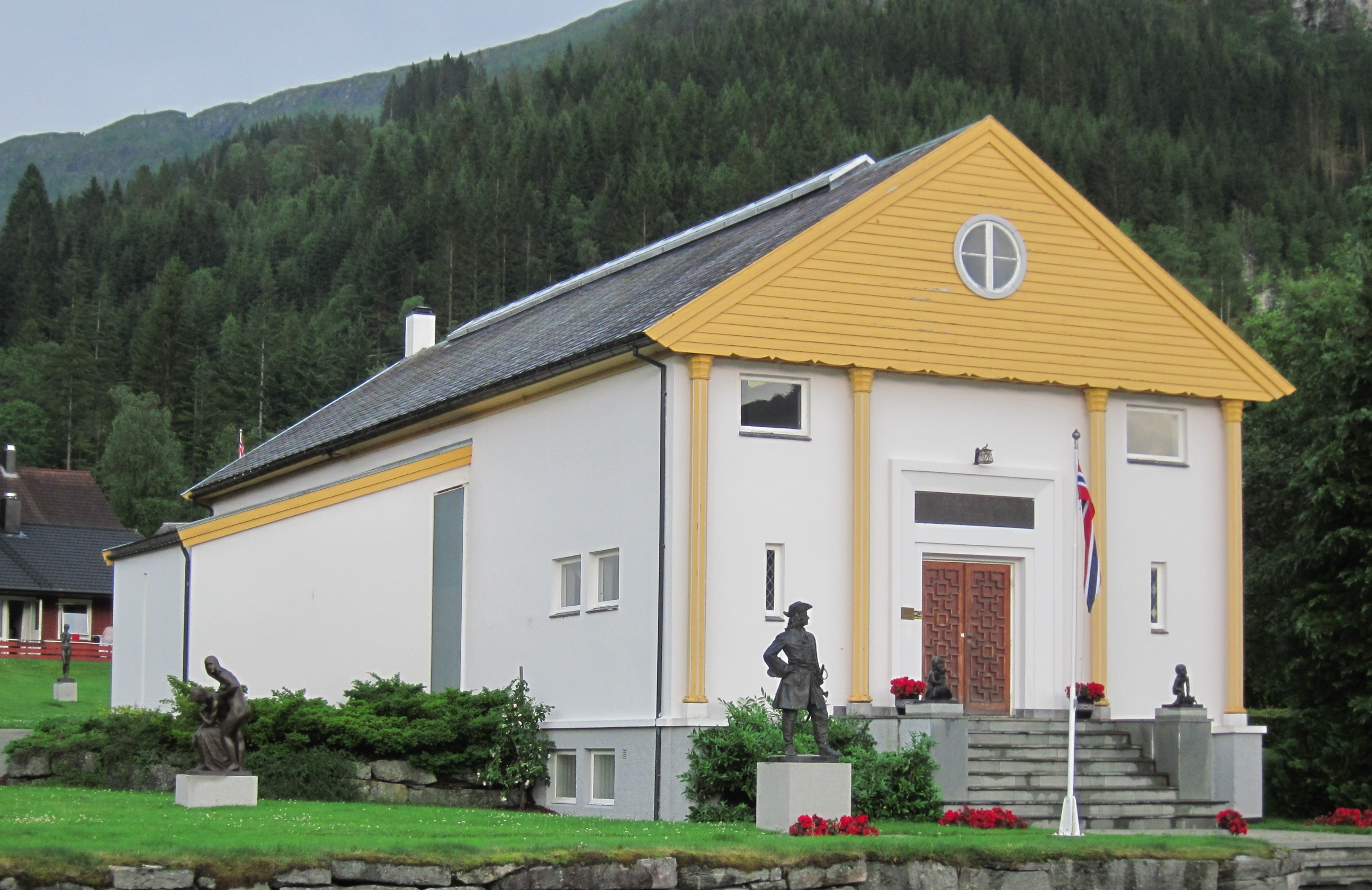
The Anders Svor Museum at Grodås in Volda Municipality

At the age of 17, he traveled to Kristiania (now Oslo), where he began as a woodcutter at the Hals Brothers piano factory. Later he became a student at the Royal Drawing School (now the Norwegian National Academy of Craft and Art Industry), where he studied under Julius Middelthun. At the age of 21 he went to Copenhagen, where he became a student at the Royal Danish Academy of Fine Arts and studied under Stephan Sinding and Vilhelm Bissen.

Svor lived for a time in Paris, but settled in Kristiania, where he had his studio and residence. He lived alone and died on May 2, 1929. He is buried at Hornindal Church.

In his native Hornindal, the Anders Svor Museum was opened in the village of Grodås in 1953. It contains about 450 works by the artist.

== Career ==
Svor participated in several art exhibitions in Kristiania, Copenhagen, Paris, and Chicago. Svor experienced his great breakthrough with his sculpture David. At an international art exhibition in Berlin in 1891, he received a gold medal for this work of art, a prestigious award. The statue was destroyed while being shipped from an exhibit in Chicago. Together with Sofus Madsen, Svor participated in the 1924 Summer Olympics in Paris with his sculpture Diskoskaster (Discus Thrower).

In 1891 Svor won the competition for the Tordenskjold monument in Kristiania. However, he was unable to complete it, which was a difficult blow for the young artist. After his death, Svor's Tordenskiold-statuen (Tordenskjold Statue) was unveiled by King Olav V in Horten, and a copy was unveiled by Crown Prince Harald at Haakonsvern.

Regarding Svor's sculpture Bølgen (The Wave) exhibited at Skillebekk and Etter badet (After the Bath) outside Bislet Baths, the novelist Edvard Hoem wrote that he was struck by what the statues express; that they have "both excitement and grace." According to Hoem, Svor's work was overshadowed by the dominant sculptor Gustav Vigeland. The writer Morten Johan Svendsen writes that Svor's figurative imagery seems "both outdated and foreign today," while both Svendsen and the writer Inge Fænn believe that Svor was one of Norway's foremost sculptors after Vigeland.

== Sculptures ==
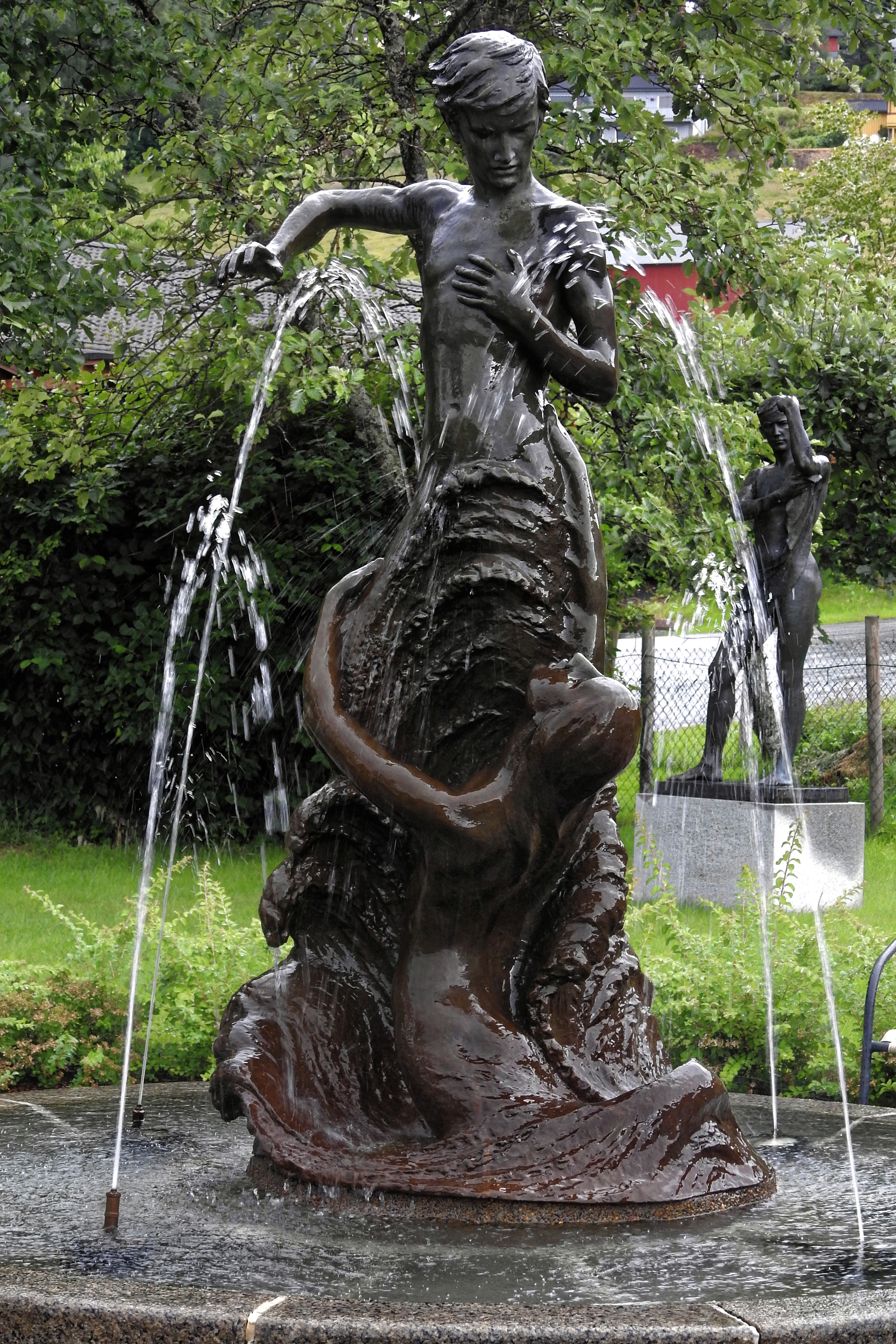
Bolgen (The Wave)

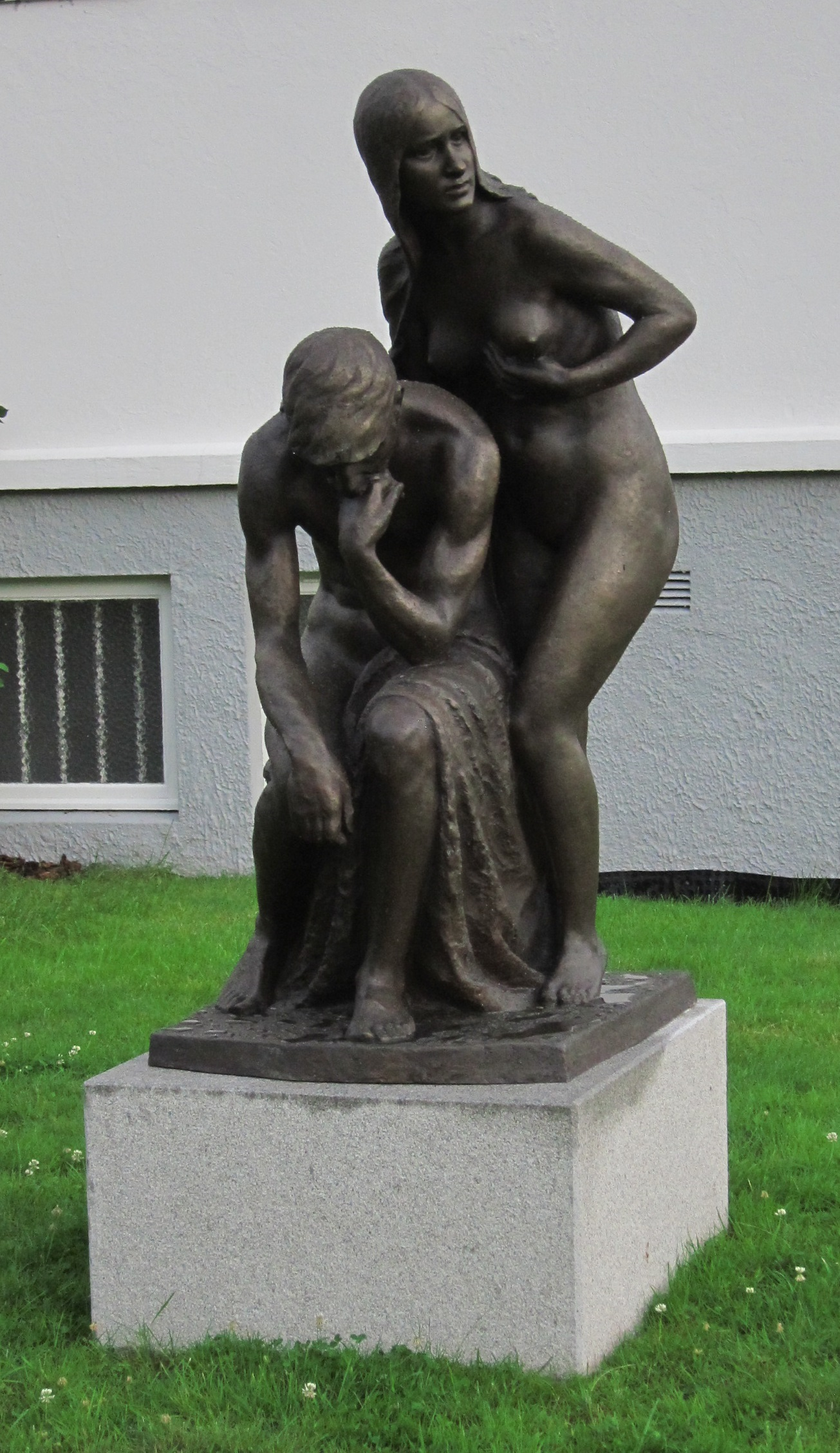
Outdoor sculpture at the Anders Svor Museum

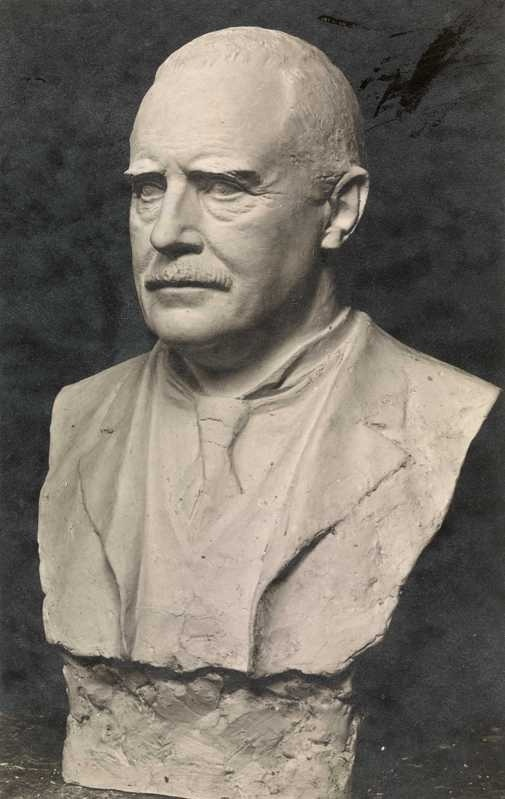
Bust of Wollert Konow

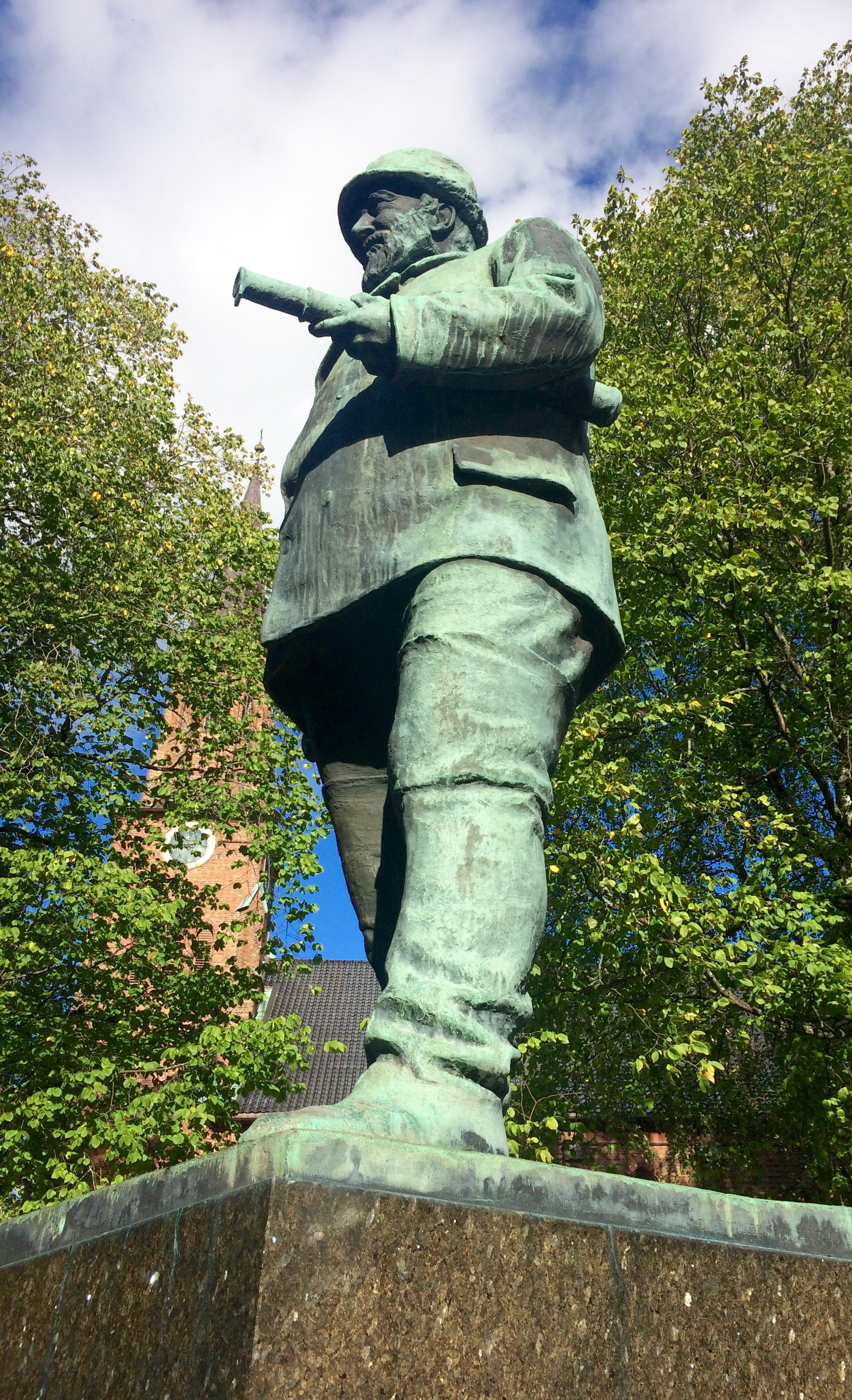
Statue of Svend Foyn

- Tordenskiold-statuen (Tordenskjold Statue) at the Naval Officers Club (Norwegian: Sjømilitære Samfund) in Horten, unveiled by King Olav V, copy at Haakonsvern unveiled by Crown Prince Harald
- Bolgen (The Wave), a.k.a. Havfruefontenen (The Mermaid Fountain) at Skillebekk in Oslo
- David, a prize-winning work at a competition in Berlin
- Christian Michelsen and Oscar II at the Anders Svor Museum
- Etter badet (After the Bath) at Bislet Baths in Oslo
- Statue of Svend Foyn in Tønsberg
- Bust of Bjørnstjerne Bjørnson
- Bust of Christian Michelsen
- Bust of Henrik Ibsen
- Bust of Wollert Konow
- Bust of Fridtjof Nansen
