= Theodor Madsen =

Norwegian writer

- Born: January 14, 1858
- Died: November 5, 1935 (aged 77)
- Occupation: Writer

Hans Mathias Theodor Jacob Madsen (January 14, 1858 – November 5, 1935) was a Norwegian writer.

Madsen debuted with the novel I Drift (In Operation) in 1890. Most of his works are written in the Naturalist style. Madsen was the father of the sculptor Sofus Madsen and the brother of the opera singer Ina Madsen.

== Works ==
- I drift (In Operation, novel), 1890
- Guds finger (The Finger of God, novel), 1893
- Marionetter (Puppets, play), 1895
- Under kundskabens træ (Under the Tree of Knowledge, novel), 1897
- Per Gadd (play), 1915
