= Hornindalsrokken =

Mountain in Møre og Romsdal, Norway

- Rokken
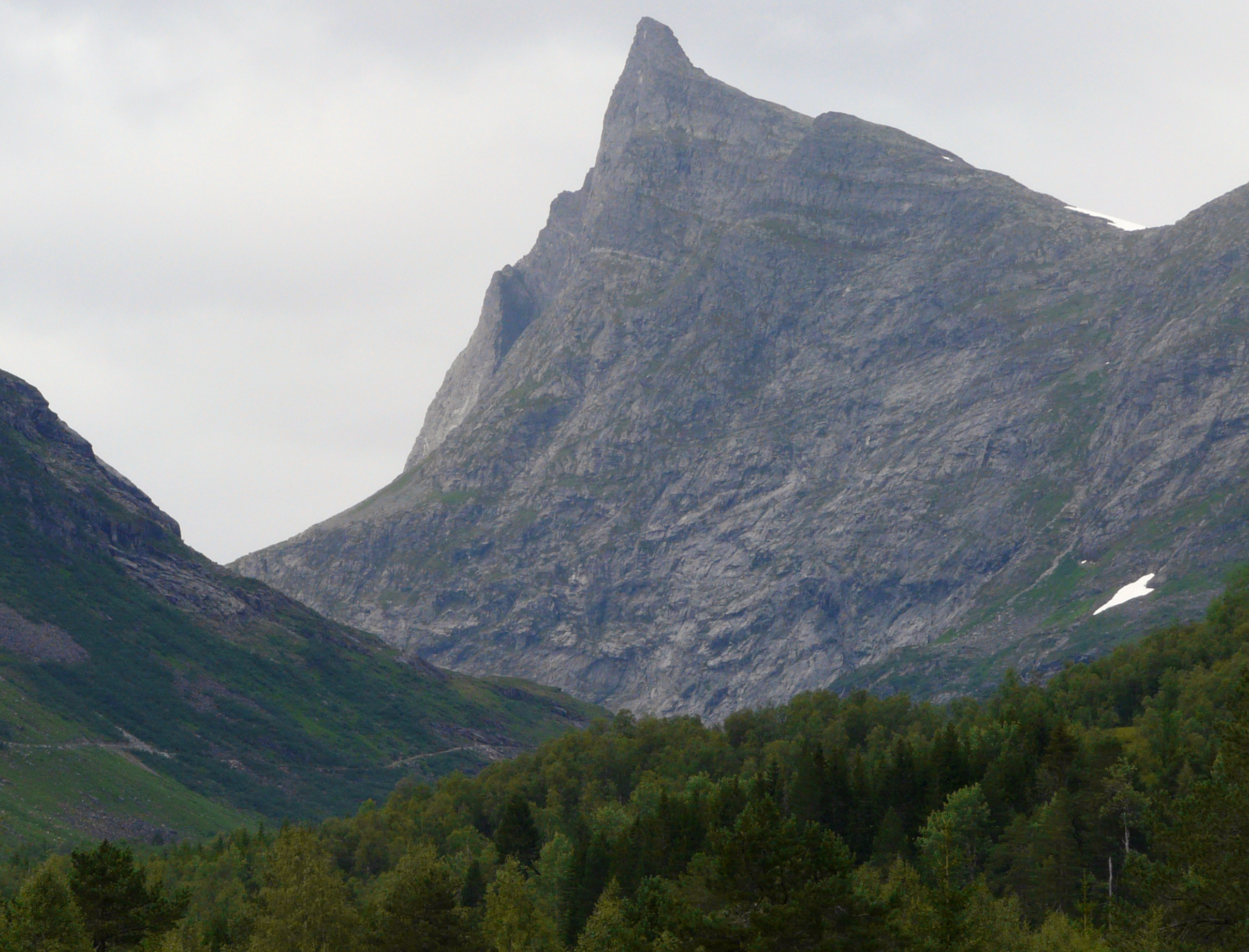
- View from Fylkesvei 60

Highest point
- Elevation: 1,527 m (5,010 ft)
- Prominence: 451 m (1,480 ft)
- Parent peak: Kvitegga
- Isolation: 2.5 km (1.6 mi)
- Coordinates: 62°04′19″N 6°39′27″E

Geography
- Interactive map of the mountain
- Location: Møre og Romsdal, Norway
- Parent range: Sunnmørsalpene
- Topo map: 1219 III Hjørundfjord

Hornindalsrokken is a 1,527-metre (5,010 ft) tall mountain in Møre og Romsdal county, Norway. It is located on the border of two municipalities: Stranda Municipality and Volda Municipality. The mountain is sometimes also called Honndalsrokken or sometimes just Rokken or Rokkjen.

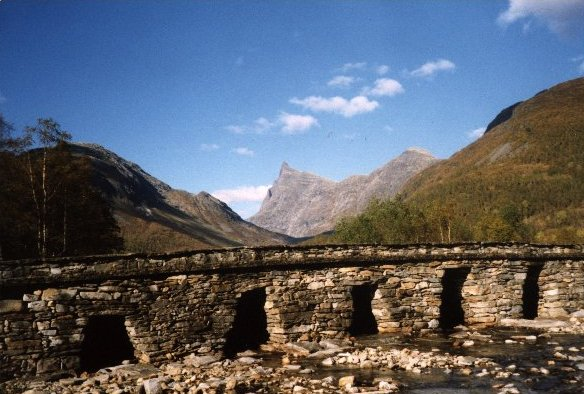
Seen from Indre Hornindal by Hornindal bridge.

The mountain is located about 14 kilometres (8.7 mi) northeast of the village of Grodås and lake Hornindalsvatnet. It is also located about 11 kilometres (6.8 mi) west of the village of Hellesylt in Stranda Municipality. It lies about 6 kilometres (3.7 mi) southeast of the village of Leira in Volda Municipality. The mountain Kvitegga is 3 kilometres (1.9 mi) to the northeast on the Volda/Stranda municipal border.

The easiest ways to climb the mountain are from the Sæterdalen valley in Volda Municipality or from the Kjellstaddalen valley in Stranda Municipality. A popular viewpoint of the summit is from the Honndøla bridge which was built in 1810. The bridge lies near Norwegian County Road 60 in Indre Hornindal. North of the mountain lies the lake Tyssevatnet which is the innermost lake in the Hjørundfjorden area.

== See also ==
- List of mountains of Norway
