= Anders Svor Museum =

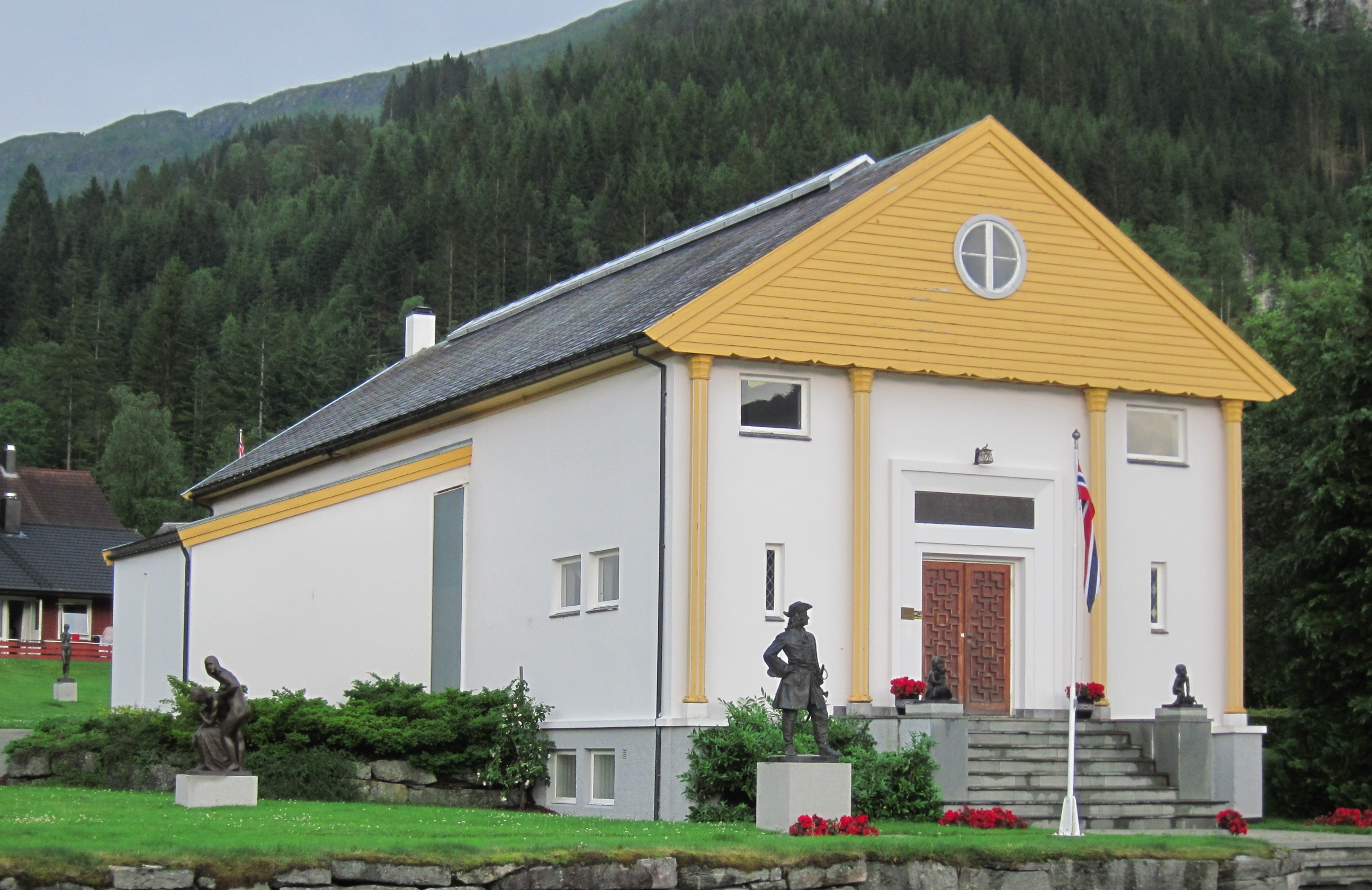
- Museum with outdoor sculptures, 2014

- Location within Vestland
- Established: 1953
- Location: Grodås, Norway
- Coordinates: 61°57′55″N 6°31′26″E
- Type: Art museum
- Website: https://misf.no/en/anders-svor-museum

The Anders Svor Museum is an art museum in Grodås, Norway dedicated to the sculptor Anders Svor (1864–1929), who was from the village. The museum building, which contains most of the sculptor's work, a total of 450 works, was opened in 1953.

The collection was transferred to the municipality free of charge by Anders Svor's heirs in a deed of gift of 1941. A condition in the deed was that a fireproof museum building should be built. Because of the war, it took time to carry out the plans, but in 1951 a building permit was granted by the Ministry of Provisioning and Reconstruction. The building was inaugurated on July 12, 1953. A bust of Svor stands in the yard outside. In 1992, the museum was expanded and the exhibition space for the sculpture collection was improved. Since 2004, the museum has been run by the Sogn og Fjordane Art Museum, and, since 2009, the museum has been part of the consortium Museums of Sogn og Fjordane. The museum underwent an internal renovation in 2014 for the 150th anniversary of Svor's birth.

Anders Svor's art has a Realist form, often combined with a Romantic leaning. Anders Svor is represented around Norway by a number of major works, including ones displayed at the National Museum of Art, Architecture and Design in Oslo.

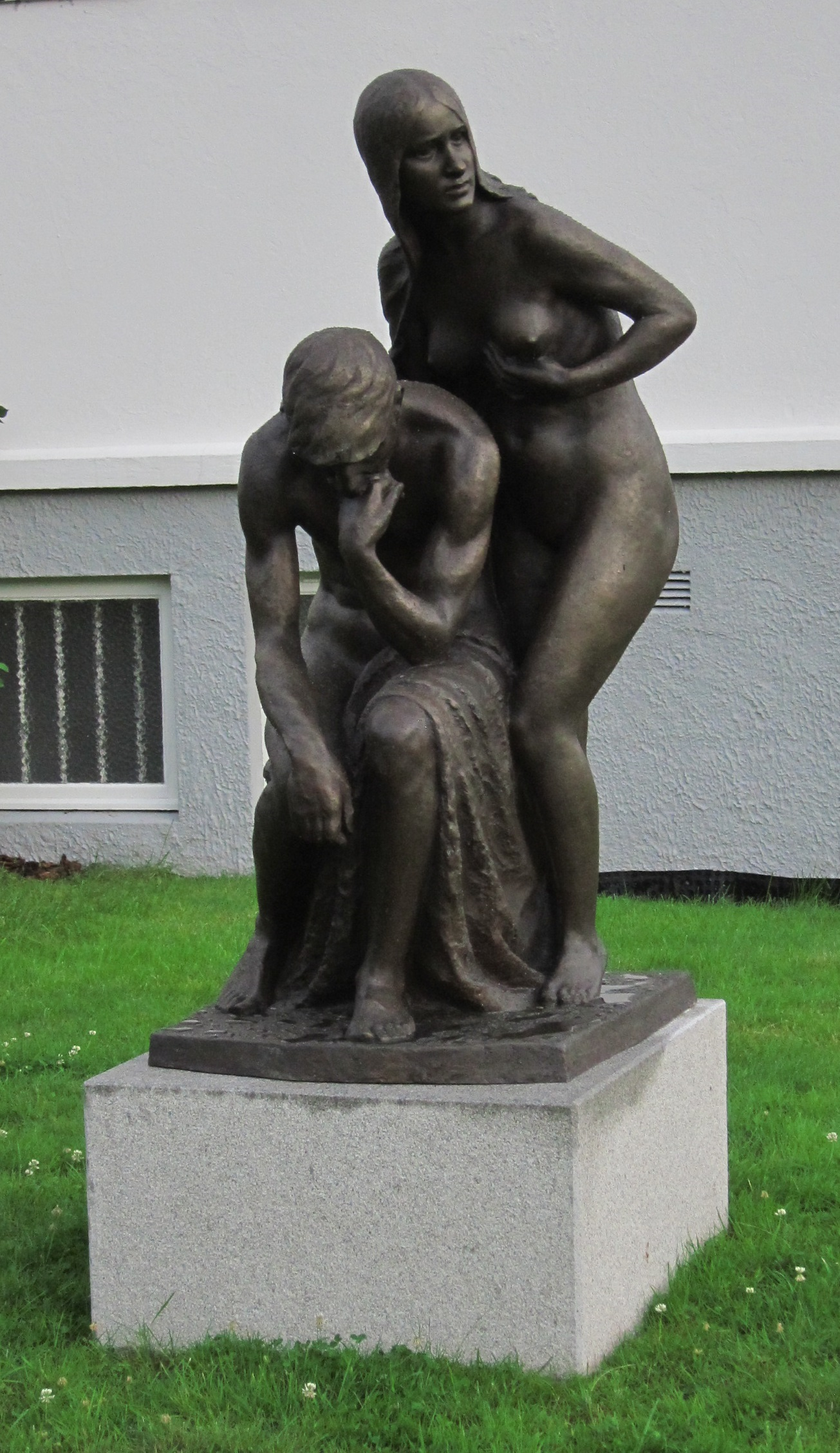
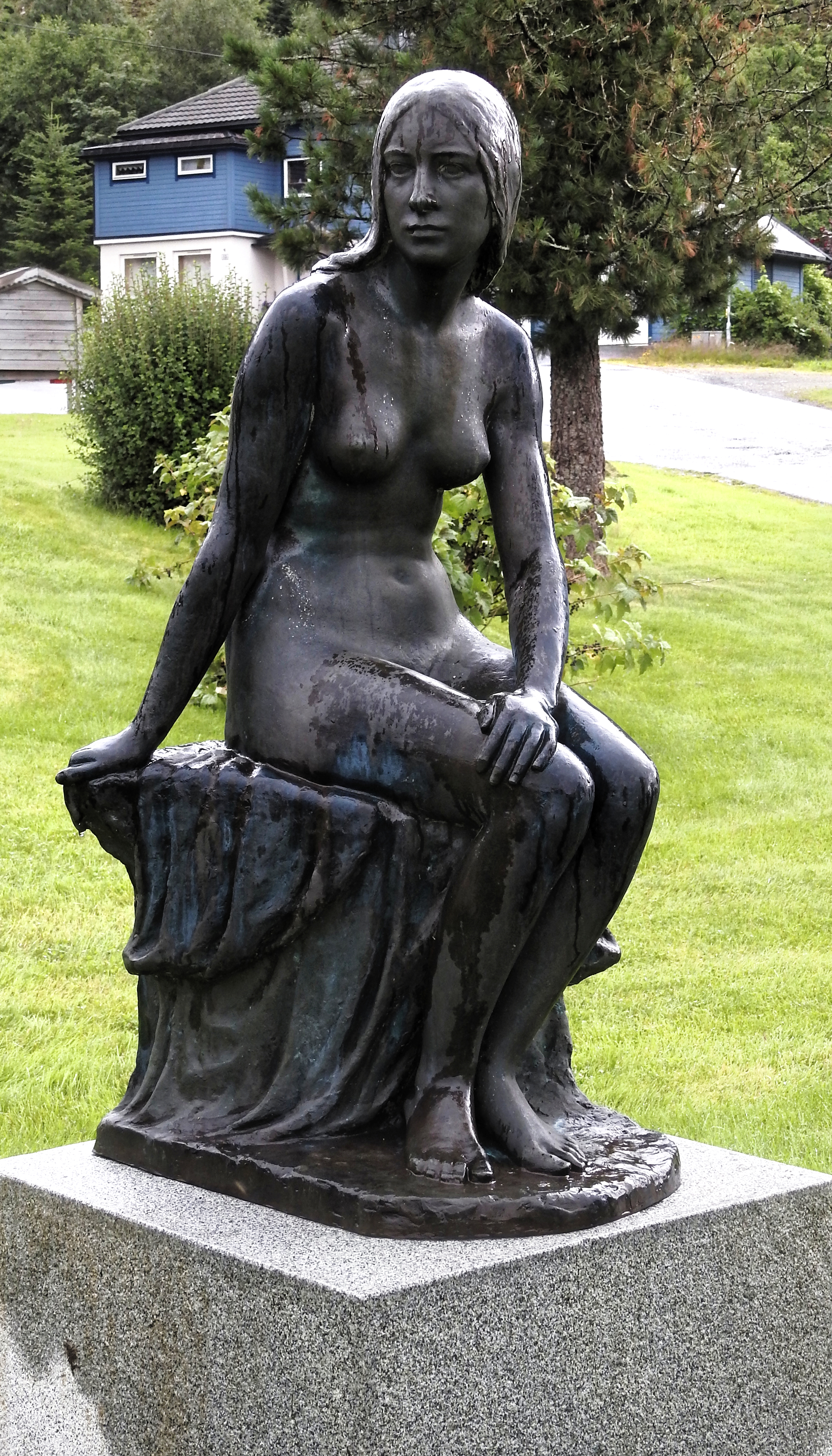
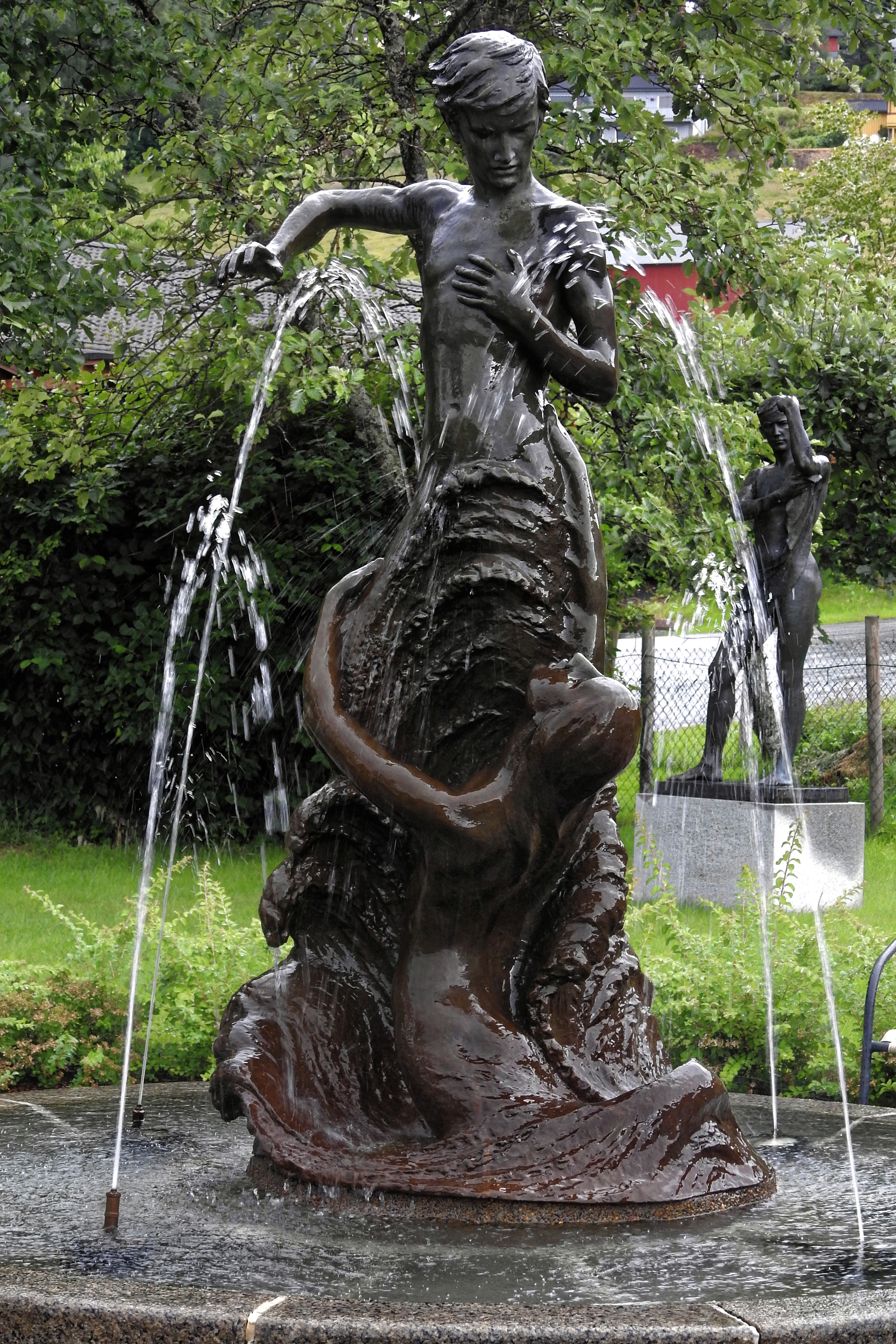
Sculptures outside the Anders Svor Museum in Grodås
