= Mogrenda =

Village in Stad Municipality, Norway

- Village
- Interactive map of Mogrenda
- Location within Vestland Location within Norway
- Coordinates: 61.9180°N 6.0825°E
- Country: Norway
- Region: Western Norway
- County: Vestland
- District: Nordfjord
- Municipality: Stad Municipality

Area
  - Total: 0.31 km^{2} (0.12 sq mi)
- Elevation: 64 m (210 ft)

Population (2024)
  - Total: 375
  - Density: 1,210/km^{2} (3,100/sq mi)
- Time zone: UTC+01:00 (CET)
  - Summer (DST): UTC+02:00 (CEST)
- Post Code: 6770 Nordfjordeid

Mogrenda is a village in Stad Municipality in Vestland county, Norway. The village is located at the western end of the lake Hornindalsvatnet along the river Eidselva. It is about 5 kilometres (3.1 mi) east of the village of Nordfjordeid, about 10 kilometres (6.2 mi) north of the village of Lote, and about 10 kilometres (6.2 mi) west of the village of Heggjabygda.

The European route E39 highway and the Norwegian National Road 15 run concurrently through Mogrenda. These road connections link Mogrenda to Nordfjordeid to the west, Volda to the north, Otta to the east, and Sandane to the south.

The 0.31-square-kilometre (77-acre) village has a population (2024) of 375 and a population density of 1,210 inhabitants per square kilometre (3,100/sq mi).
