= Sofus Madsen =

Norwegian sculptor

- Born: June 11, 1881; Kristiania, Norway
- Died: January 19, 1977 (aged 95); Bergen, Norway
- Occupation: Sculptor

Sofus Trygve Madsen (June 11, 1881 – January 19, 1977) was a Norwegian sculptor that has influenced the cityscape of Bergen with a total of 28 major and minor works. He was the son of the teacher and author Theodor Madsen.

== Life and work ==
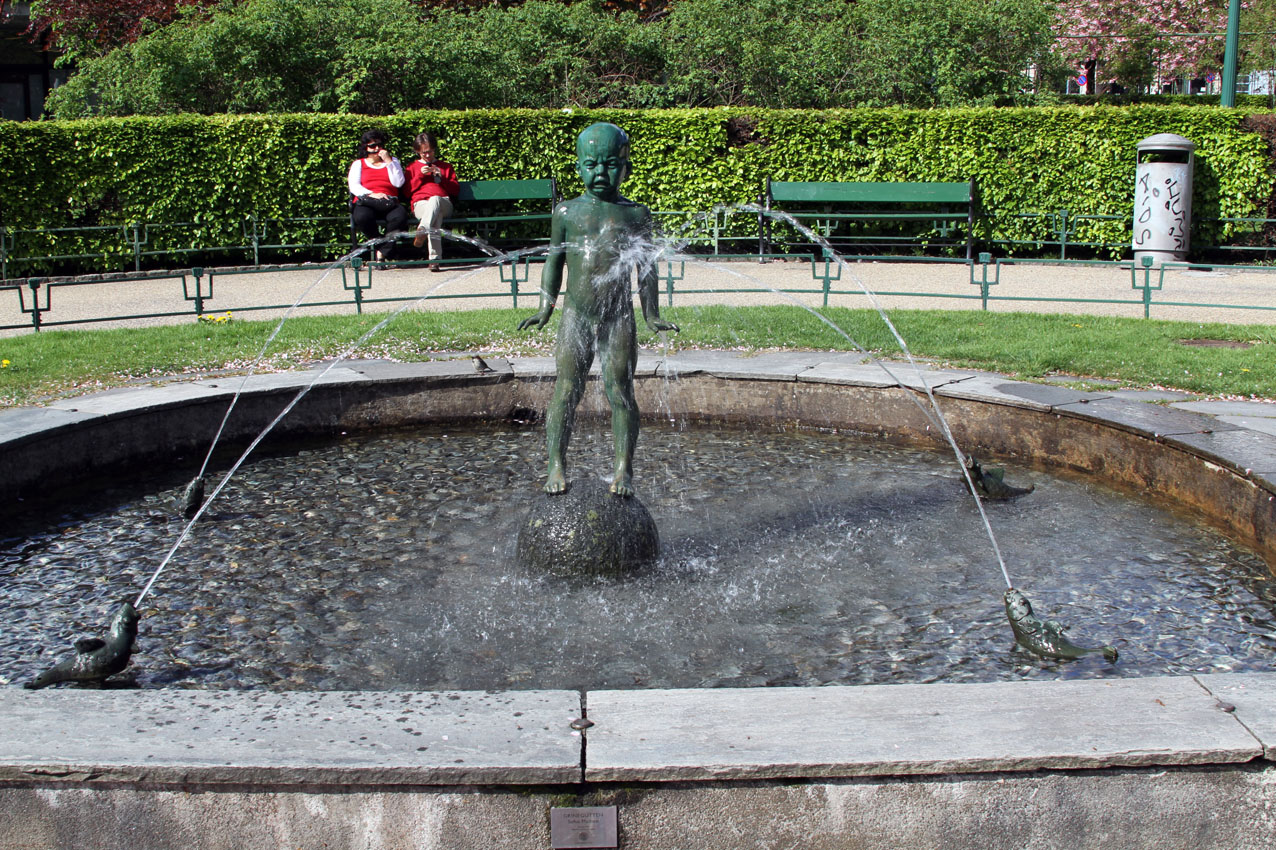
Sofus Madsen's Grinegutten (The Crying Boy)

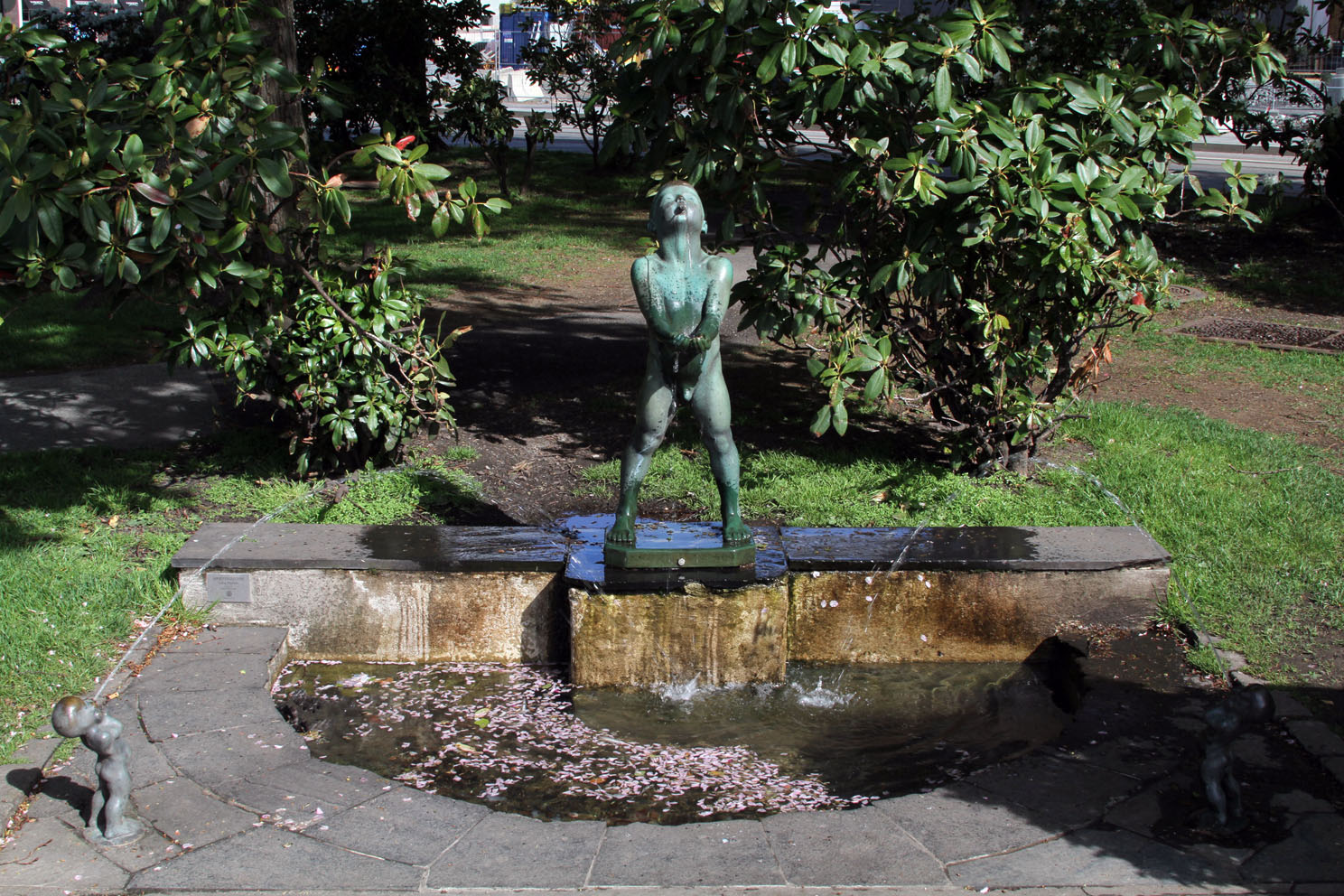
Sofus Madsen's Sprøytegutten (The Spraying Boy)

Madsen was born in Kristiania (now Oslo), but his family moved to Bergen when he was three years old. He studied under the sculptor Ingebrigt Vik and mostly worked as a stucco artist at that time. Madsen received his artistic education at the Royal Danish Academy of Fine Arts in Copenhagen and continued his education in Berlin and Paris before settling in Bergen in 1914. Together with Anders Svor he participated in the 1924 Summer Olympics in Paris with two sculptures. He settled on Kanonhaugen Street in the Landås neighborhood of Bergen, in a house and studio that he designed himself.

In 1999, the Sofus Madsen Museum opened in the house. It contains up to 180 sculptures, medals, drawings, and tapestries, some of which were made by his wife, Grethe Corneliussen Madsen. Madsen mostly created human figures in a classicist style with poses and expressions reflecting the attitudes and emotions in the themes he addressed. His most prominent work is Merkur (Mercury), which is located on the tower of the Sundt department store on the main square in Bergen, Torgallmenningen. The tower and statue rise 35 meters (115 ft) above the six-story building itself. Altogether there are 28 sculptures and reliefs by Sofus Madsen in Bergen.
