= Ina Madsen =

Norwegian opera singer

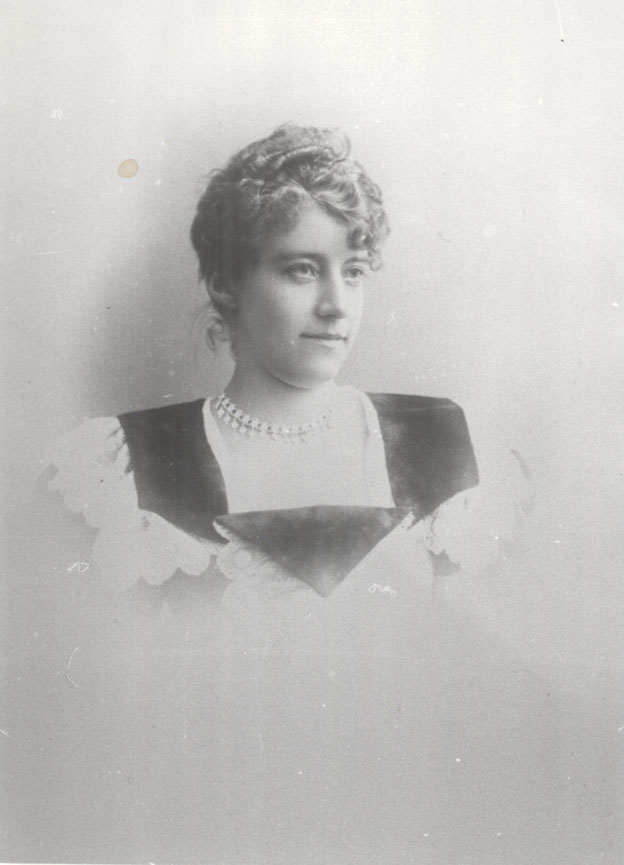
- Born: December 31, 1867; Ofoten, Norway
- Died: August 16, 1935 (aged 67); Copenhagen, Denmark
- Occupation: Singer

Jacobine Susanne "Ina" Madsen (December 31, 1867 – August 19, 1935) was a Norwegian opera singer and voice teacher.

== Family ==
Ina Madsen was the daughter of the shipowner Jacob Edvard Didrik Madsen and Susanne Sofie Clausen, and the sister of the writer Theodor Madsen. She married the architect Børge Rosenkilde (c. 1869–1927). Her father died before she was baptized in Bergen.

== Life and work ==
Madsen studied under Camilla Wiese and Julius Stockhausen. She received the state scholarships two times, was twice a recipient of the Henrichsen scholarship (established by Theodor Henrichsen), and studied in Paris under Pauline Viardot. She debuted on May 22, 1889 at the National Theater in Bergen in the role of Zerlina in Mozart's opera Don Giovanni. She performed at the same venue in June 1889, together with Christian Zangenberg as Griolet, in the role of Stella in Jacques Offenbach's The Drum Major's Daughter.

In the 1890s, she performed in Bergen, where she had grown up, and then toured Europe with concerts in Cologne, Düsseldorf, Frankfurt, and elsewhere. On February 20, 1898, she held her official farewell concert in Norway, in the Gamle Logen banquet hall. There she performed a selection of folk songs, arias, and songs by a wide variety of composers, such as Halfdan Kjerulf, Edvard Grieg, Agathe Backer Grøndahl, and Gaetano Donizetti. She received considerable praise for her aria interpretation of Donizetti's opera Lucia di Lammermoor in Germany.

In 1900 she performed at the National Theater in Oslo in the role of Siébel in Faust. In addition to her roles in operas, Madsen often performed as a concert singer. She worked for many years as a voice teacher and concert singer in Berlin, where she lived during her married life.

== Selected roles ==
- Zerlina in Wolfgang Amadeus Mozart's Don Giovanni (National Theater, 1889)
- Stella in Jacques Offenbach's The Drum Major's Daughter (National Theater, 1889)
- Siébel in Charles Gounod's Faust (National Theater, 1900)
- Micaëla in Georges Bizet's Carmen

== Awards ==
- 1897: Government Grant for Artists, NOK 750
- 1900: Theodor Henrichsen scholarship, NOK 2,000
