= Heggjabygda =

Village in Stad Municipality, Norway

- Village
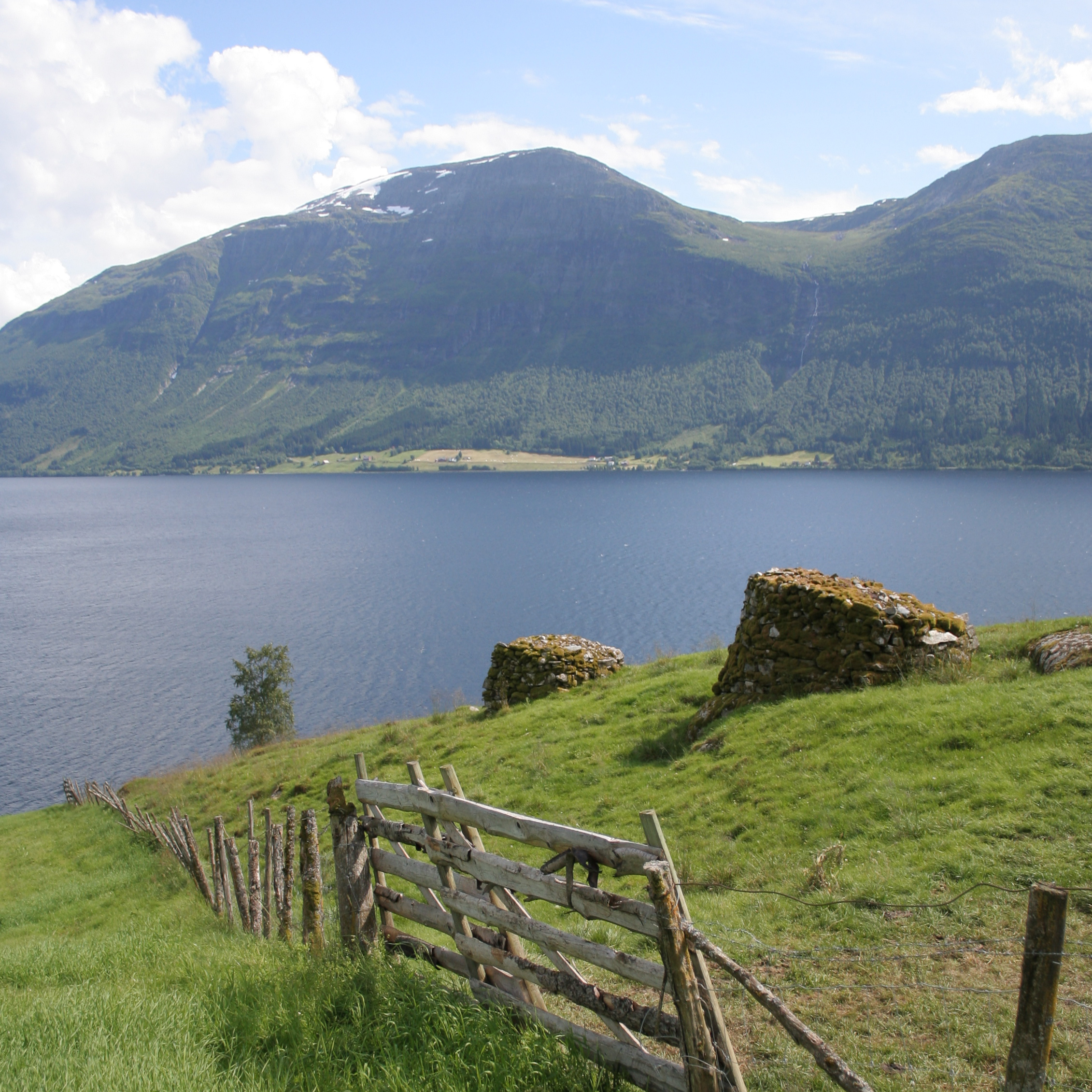
- View from Heggjabygda across the lake
- Interactive map of Heggjabygda
- Location within Vestland Location within Norway
- Coordinates: 61.9348°N 6.2668°E
- Country: Norway
- Region: Western Norway
- County: Vestland
- District: Nordfjord
- Municipality: Stad Municipality
- Elevation: 54 m (177 ft)
- Time zone: UTC+01:00 (CET)
  - Summer (DST): UTC+02:00 (CEST)
- Post Code: 6770 Nordfjordeid

Heggjabygda is a village in Stad Municipality in Vestland county, Norway. The village is located along the northern shore of the large lake Hornindalsvatnet. The village of Mogrenda lies about 10 kilometres (6.2 mi) to the west. Heggjabygda Church is located in the village, right along the lake shore. The village sits at the intersection of Norwegian county roads 664 and 665 with connections to the village of Fyrde (in Volda Municipality) to the north and the villages of Mogrenda and Nordfjordeid to the east.

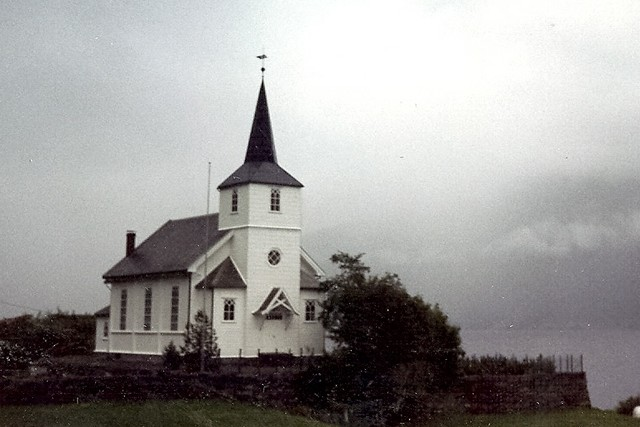
View of the local Heggjabygda Church
