= Bjørn Lødemel =

Norwegian politician (born 1958)

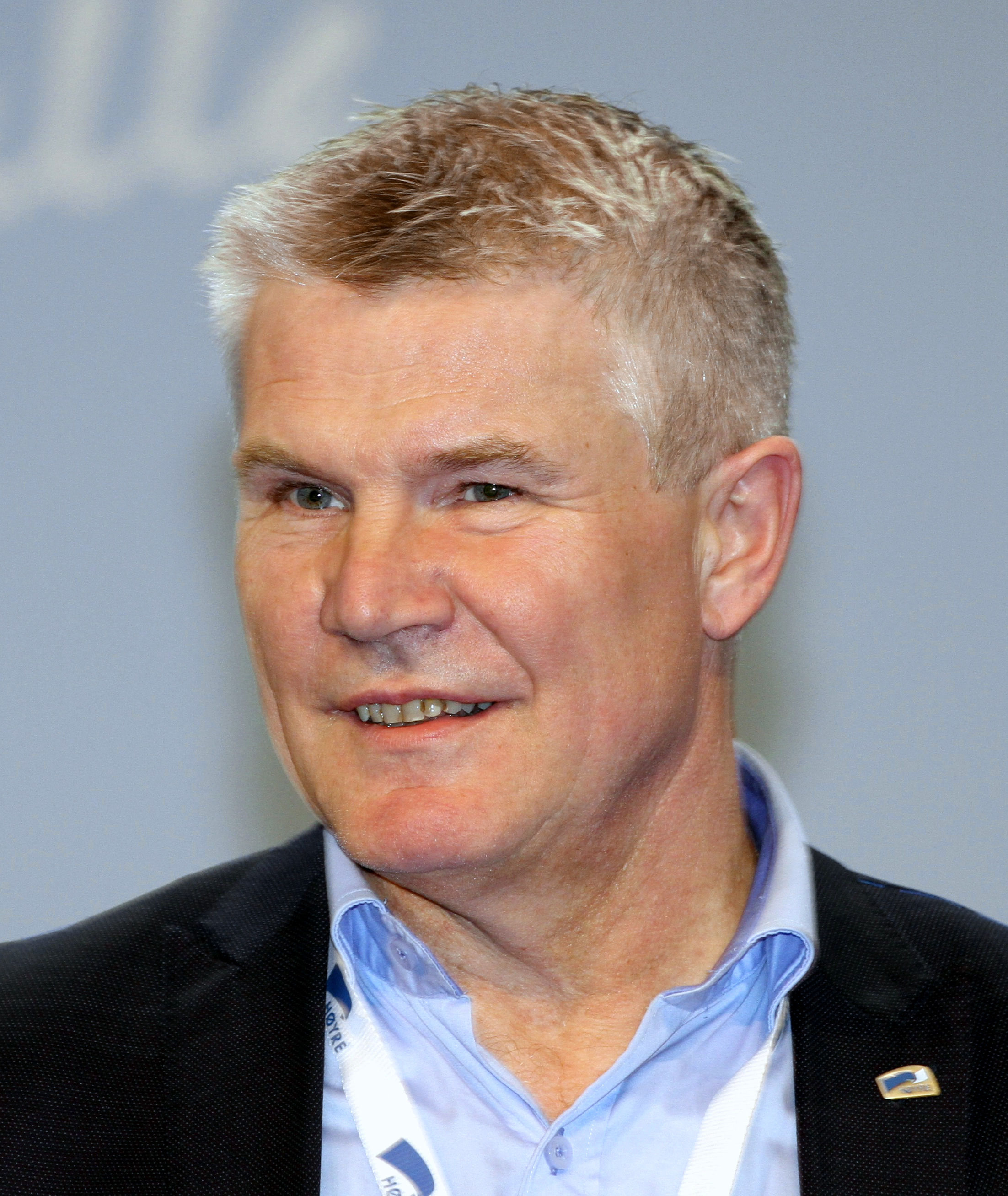
Bjørn Lødemel

Bjørn Lødemel (born 19 August 1958) is a Norwegian politician and a member of the Conservative Party of Norway (Høyre). He was elected to the Stortinget from Sogn og Fjordane in 2009. He had been mayor of Hornindal Municipality since 1995, and a member of the council since 1991. He has also been regional council leader, and is the leader of Sogn og Fjordane Conservative Party.

Lødemel has previously worked in business and the military, and has worked in factories and been a self-employed businessman.

== Storting committees ==
- 2009–2013 member of Energy and environment committee

Political offices
Preceded by Ola Are Ytrehorn	Mayor of Hornindal Municipality; 1995-2009	Succeeded by Edvin Haugen
