= Hornindal Church =

Church in Møre og Romsdal, Norway

- Hornindal kyrkje
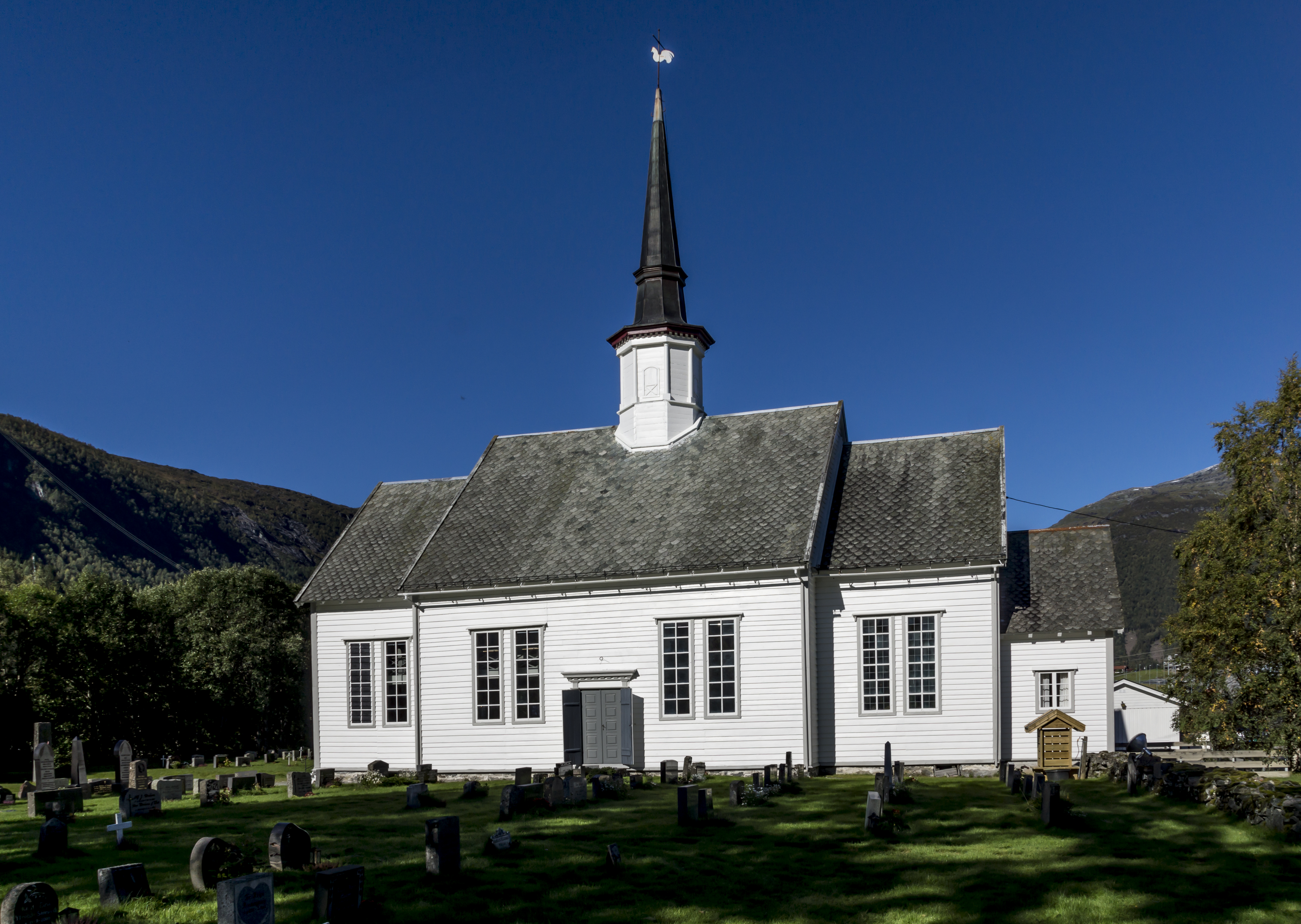
- View of the church
- Hornindal Church
- 61.9738492242°N 6.5219387412°E
- Location: Volda, Møre og Romsdal
- Country: Norway
- Denomination: Church of Norway
- Churchmanship: Evangelical Lutheran

History
- Status: Parish church
- Founded: 13th century
- Consecrated: 30 November 1856

Architecture
- Functional status: Active
- Architect: Ludolph Rolfsen
- Architectural type: Long church
- Completed: 1856 (170 years ago)

Specifications
- Capacity: 400
- Materials: Wood

Administration
- Diocese: Møre bispedømme
- Deanery: Søre Sunnmøre prosti
- Parish: Hornindal
- Norwegian Cultural Heritage Site
- Type: Church
- Status: Listed
- ID: 84633

Hornindal Church (Norwegian: Hornindal kyrkje) is a parish church of the Church of Norway in Volda Municipality in Møre og Romsdal county, Norway. It is located in the village of Grodås, at the eastern end of the lake Hornindalsvatnet. It is the church for the Hornindal parish which is part of the Søre Sunnmøre prosti (deanery) in the Diocese of Møre. The white, wooden church was built in a long church design in 1856 using plans drawn up by the architect Ludolph Rolfsen using plans created by Hans Linstow. The church seats about 400 people. The sculptor Anders Svor is buried in the church cemetery.

== History ==
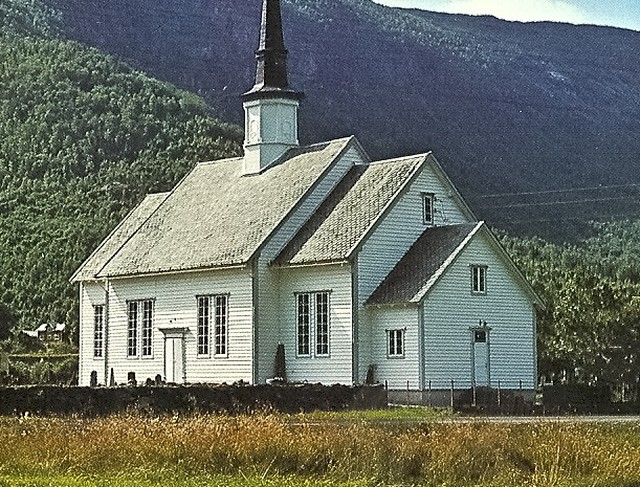
View of the exterior of the church

The earliest existing historical records of the Hornindal church date back to the year 1330, but the church was not new that year. The first church in Hornindal was a wooden stave church called Hornynarkyrkja and it was located in Ytrehorn, just west of the present location. The church was likely founded in the 13th century. This church was demolished around the year 1600. It was replaced by a low, wooden long church at the nearby Kirkhorn farm. In 1703, the tower was rebuilt. In 1856, new church was built about 30 metres (98 ft) north of the older church. The architect Ludolph Rolfsen designed the building using plans created by the famous architect Hans Linstow. The builder was first Anders Muldsvor, but he died before the work was finished, and was replaced by Gjert Lien. The church was consecrated on 30 November 1856 by the priest Wilhelm Frimann Koren. After the new church was in use, the old church was torn down. In 1907, the original tile roof was replaced with a slate roof. In 1956, a sacristy was built adjacent to the chancel.

Prior to 1 January 2020, the church was part of the Nordfjord prosti in the Diocese of Bjørgvin. On 1 January 2020, Hornindal Municipality was merged into Volda Municipality which was in a different county, so also on that date it was transferred to Søre Sunnmøre prosti in the Diocese of Møre.

== See also ==
- List of churches in Møre
