= Hotel Alexandra (Loen) =

Historic hotel in Loen, Norway

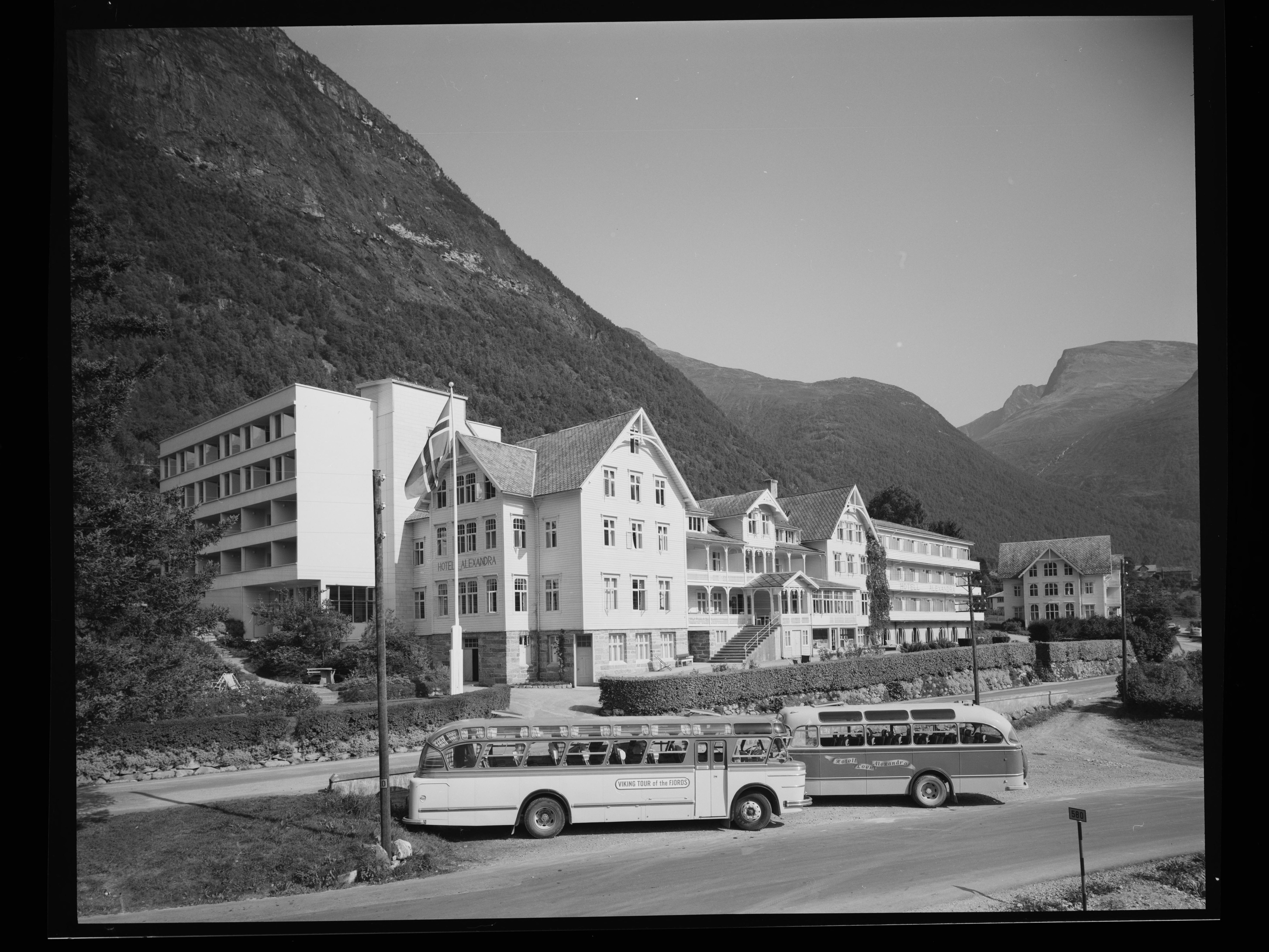

- Location of the hotel Hotel Alexandra (Loen) (Norway)

General information
- Location: Loen, Stryn, Norway
- Coordinates: 61°52′23″N 06°50′39″E
- Opening: 1884
- Owner: Loen family

Other information
- Number of rooms: 187

Website
- Hotel Alexandra

Hotel Alexandra is a historic hotel in the village of Loen in Stryn Municipality in Vestland county, Norway.

== History ==
The hotel was opened by Markus Anders Loen (1862-1927) under the name Loen's Hotel in 1884, but since 1892 has been in continuous operation under the name Hotel Alexandra. The hotel is named after Princess Alexandra of Denmark. The hotel, which overlooks the Nordfjorden, has undergone several minor and major developments and changes over the years, but stands today as a modern family-tourist and conference hotel.

The hotel is part of a group that also owns the neighboring hotel Hotel Loenfjord. There is currently fourth and fifth generation of the same family running it. Eivind Grov has been director since 1965. As of 2012, Alexandra Hotel has 190 hotel rooms, four restaurants, two bars, a nightclub/disco, personal wine cellar, and spa.

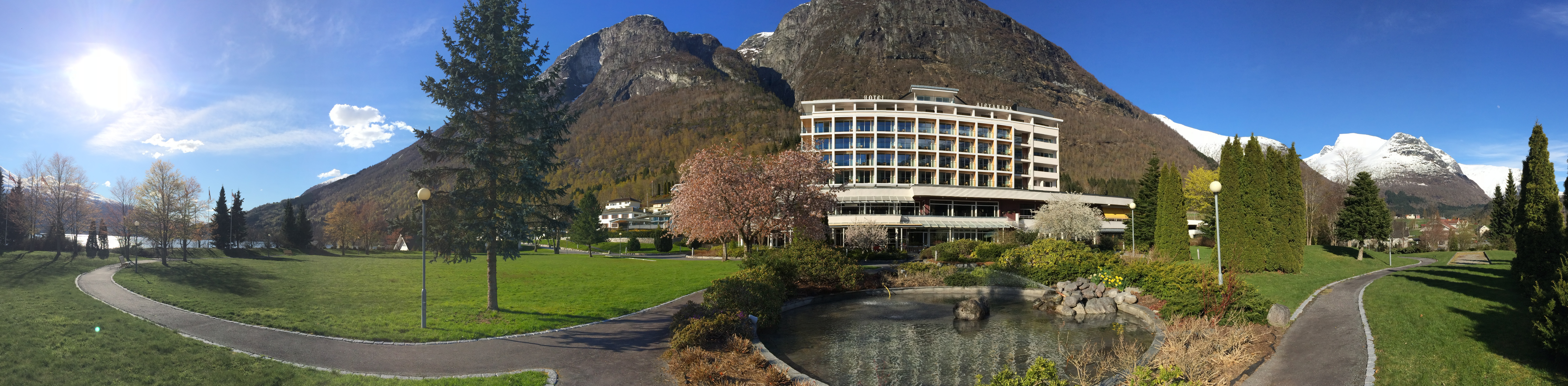
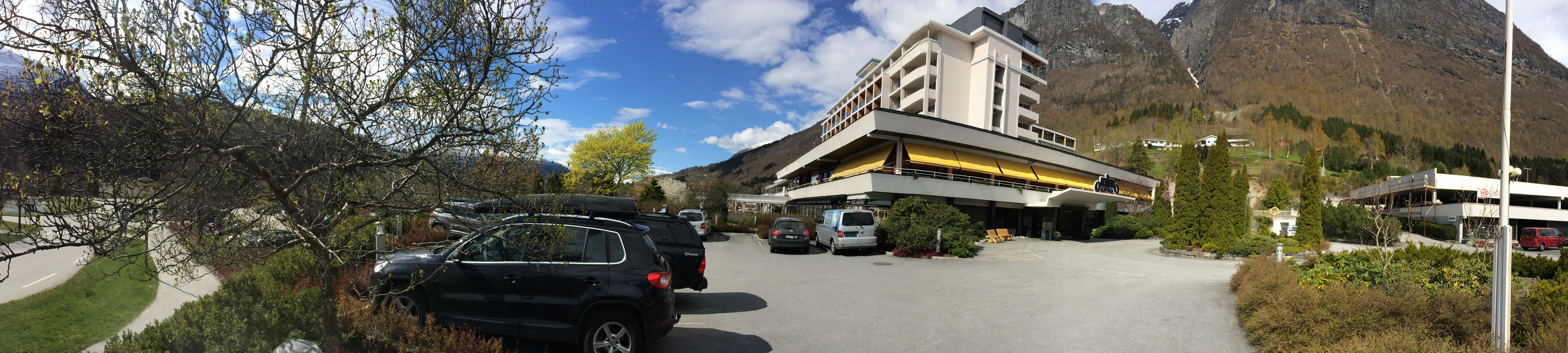
