= Kviven Tunnel =

Road tunnel in Volda, Norway

Kviven Tunnel Kvivstunnelen
- Interactive map of Kviven Tunnel; Kvivstunnelen

Overview
- Location: Møre og Romsdal, Norway
- Coordinates: 62.0362°N 6.4190°E
- Route: E39
- Start: Kalvatn
- End: Grodås

Operation
- Work began: 2009
- Opened: 2012
- Traffic: Automotive
- Toll: No

Technical
- Length: 6,563 metres (4.1 mi)

The Kviven Tunnel (Norwegian: Kvivstunnelen) is a 6,563-metre (21,532 ft) long road tunnel through the mountain Kviven, along the European route E39 highway. The tunnel is located in Volda Municipality in Møre og Romsdal county, Norway. The eastern end of the tunnel is at Kalvatn, just east of the village of Fyrde and the western end is at the village of Grodås.

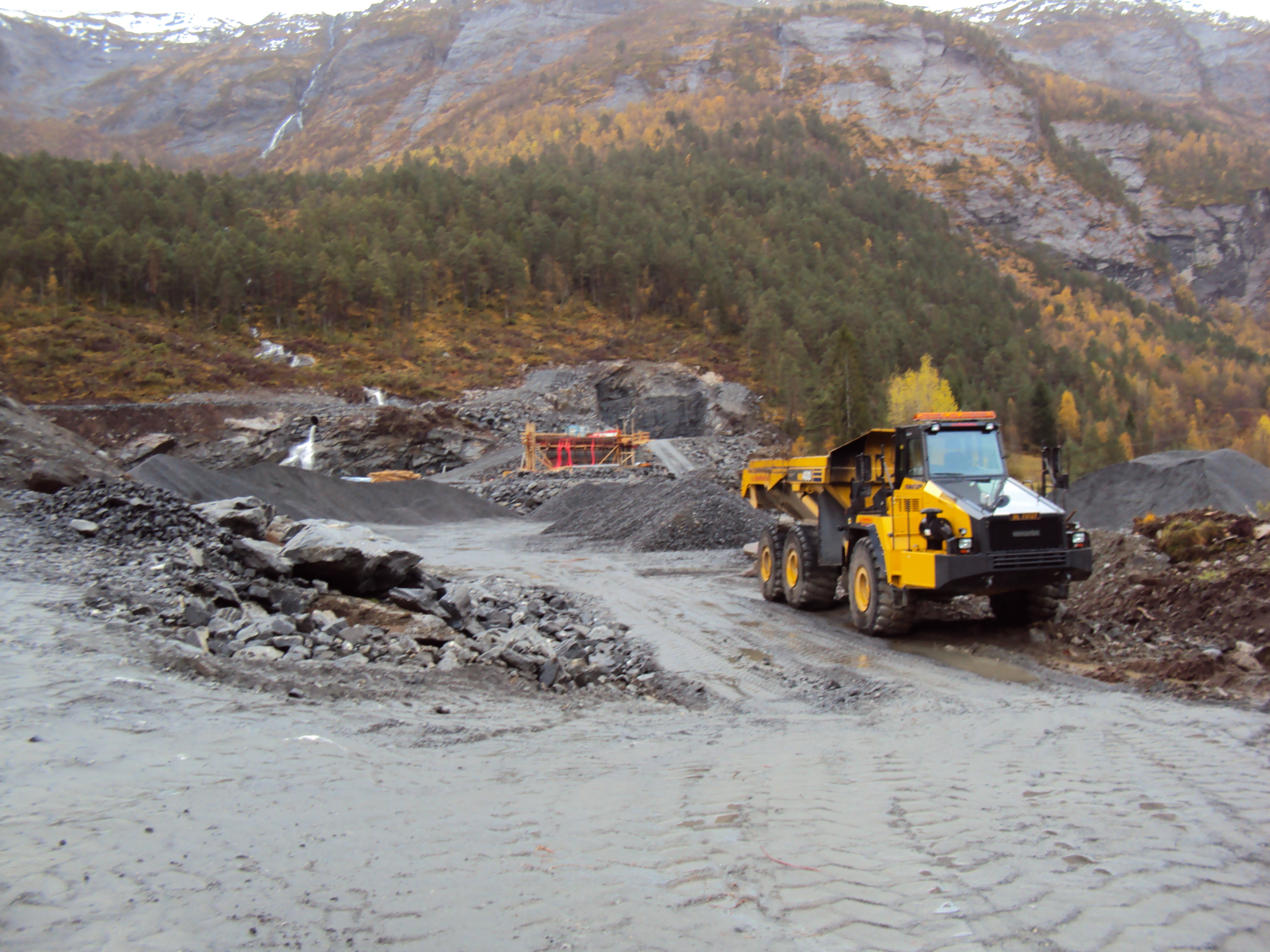
During construction of the tunnel

The tunnel was approved for construction in 2008 and it was completed in 2012. The tunnel was officially opened on 22 September 2012 by Liv Signe Navarsete, the Norwegian Minister of Local Government and Regional Development. The tunnel is part of a new ferry-free route for the E39 highway.
