= Grodås =

Village in Volda Municipality, Norway

- Village
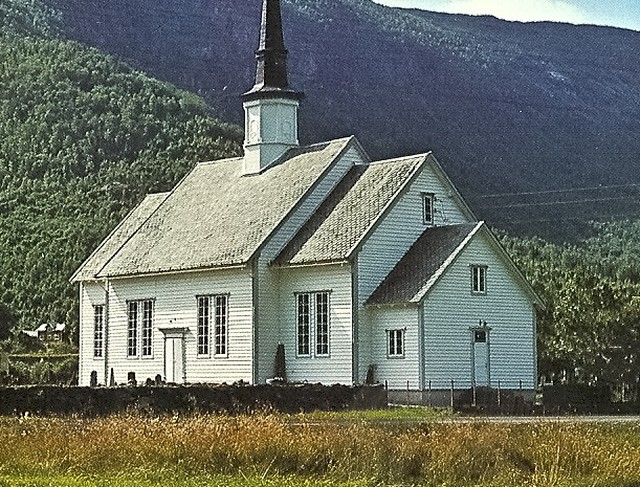
- Hornindal Church
- Interactive map of Grodås
- Location within Møre og Romsdal Location within Norway
- Coordinates: 61.9667°N 6.5250°E
- Country: Norway
- Region: Western Norway
- County: Møre og Romsdal
- District: Sunnmøre
- Municipality: Volda Municipality

Area
  - Total: 0.66 km^{2} (0.25 sq mi)
- Elevation: 55 m (180 ft)

Population (2024)
  - Total: 503
  - Density: 762/km^{2} (1,970/sq mi)
- Post Code: 6763 Grodås

Grodås is a village in Volda Municipality in Møre og Romsdal county, Norway. The village is located along the river Horndøla on the eastern end of the lake Hornindalsvatnet, about 13 kilometres (8.1 mi) southwest of the mountain Hornindalsrokken. The village sits at the eastern end of the Kviven Tunnel, part of the new route for the European route E39 highway.

The 0.66-square-kilometre (160-acre) village has a population (2024) of 503 and a population density of 762 inhabitants per square kilometre (1,970/sq mi).

The village area is a tourist destination, with the natural environment, mountains, and lake acting as a tourist attraction. It is also home to the Anders Svor Museum. Hornindal Church is located in the village. The industries located in the Grodås area include wood and furniture making as well as vacation home construction.

== History ==
Prior to 2020, the village was the administrative centre of the old Hornindal Municipality.
