= Hornindalsvatnet =

Lake in Norway, and Europe's deepest lake

- Horninsdalsvatnet
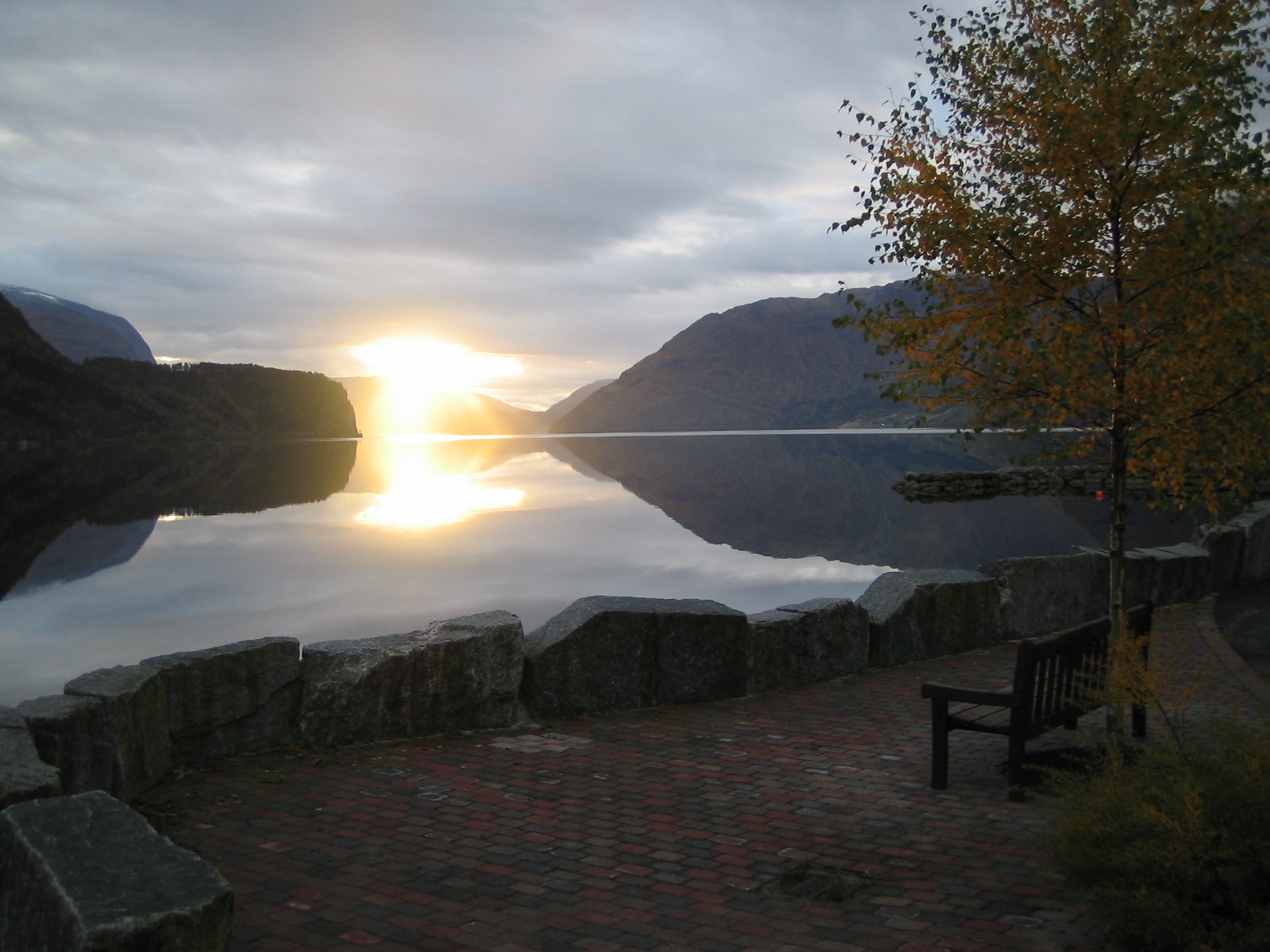
- Lake view from Grodås
- Interactive map of the lake
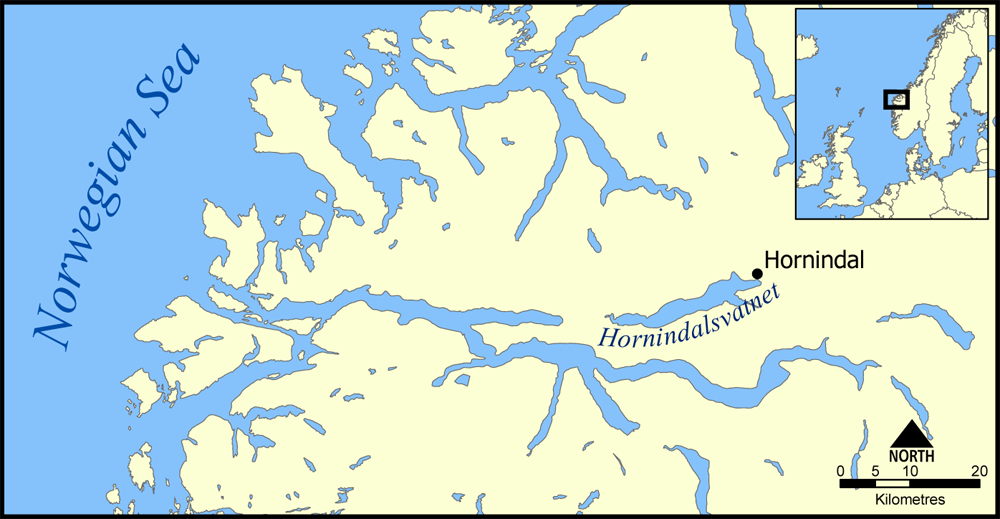
- Location: Møre og Romsdal and Vestland
- Coordinates: 61.93201°N 6.34873°E
- Type: Glacial fjord lake
- Primary inflows: Horndøla, Melheimselva (Heggjadalselva), Sindreelva and Vikaelva
- Primary outflows: Eidselva
- Catchment area: 381.68 km^{2} (147.37 sq mi)
- Basin countries: Norway
- Max. length: 24 km (15 mi)
- Max. width: 3.3 km (2.1 mi)
- Surface area: 50.76 km^{2} (19.6 sq mi)
- Average depth: 237.6 m (780 ft)
- Max. depth: 514 m (1,686 ft)
- Water volume: 12.06 km^{3} (2.89 cu mi)
- Shore length^{1}: 65.64 km (40.79 mi)
- Surface elevation: 53 m (174 ft)
- Islands: Bjørnaholmen
- References: NVE and Seppälä
- ^{1} Shore length is not a well-defined measure.

Hornindalsvatnet is Norway's and Europe's deepest lake, and the world's fourteenth deepest lake, officially measured to a depth of 514 m (1,686 ft). Its surface lies 53 m (174 ft) above sea level, which means that its bottom is 461 m (1,512 ft) below sea level.

The village of Grodås lies at the eastern end of the lake in Volda Municipality in Møre og Romsdal county and the village of Mogrenda is located on the western end of the lake in Stad Municipality in Vestland county. The European route E39 highway runs near the lake. The village of Heggjabygda and Heggjabygda Church lie on the northern shore of the lake.

Its volume is estimated at 12 km^{3} (2.9 cu mi), its area is 51 km^{2} (20 sq mi) and ranks 19th in area among Norway's lakes. The main outflow is the river Eidselva, which flows into the Eidsfjorden, an arm off the main Nordfjorden.

The deepest point of the lake was explored using a ROV in 2006. A small white fish was discovered on the lake bottom – probably a new species of Arctic charr (Salvelinus alpinus). It was previously also located in Lake Tinn, Norway's third deepest lake.

The lake is the site of the Hornindalsvatnet Marathon, held annually in July.

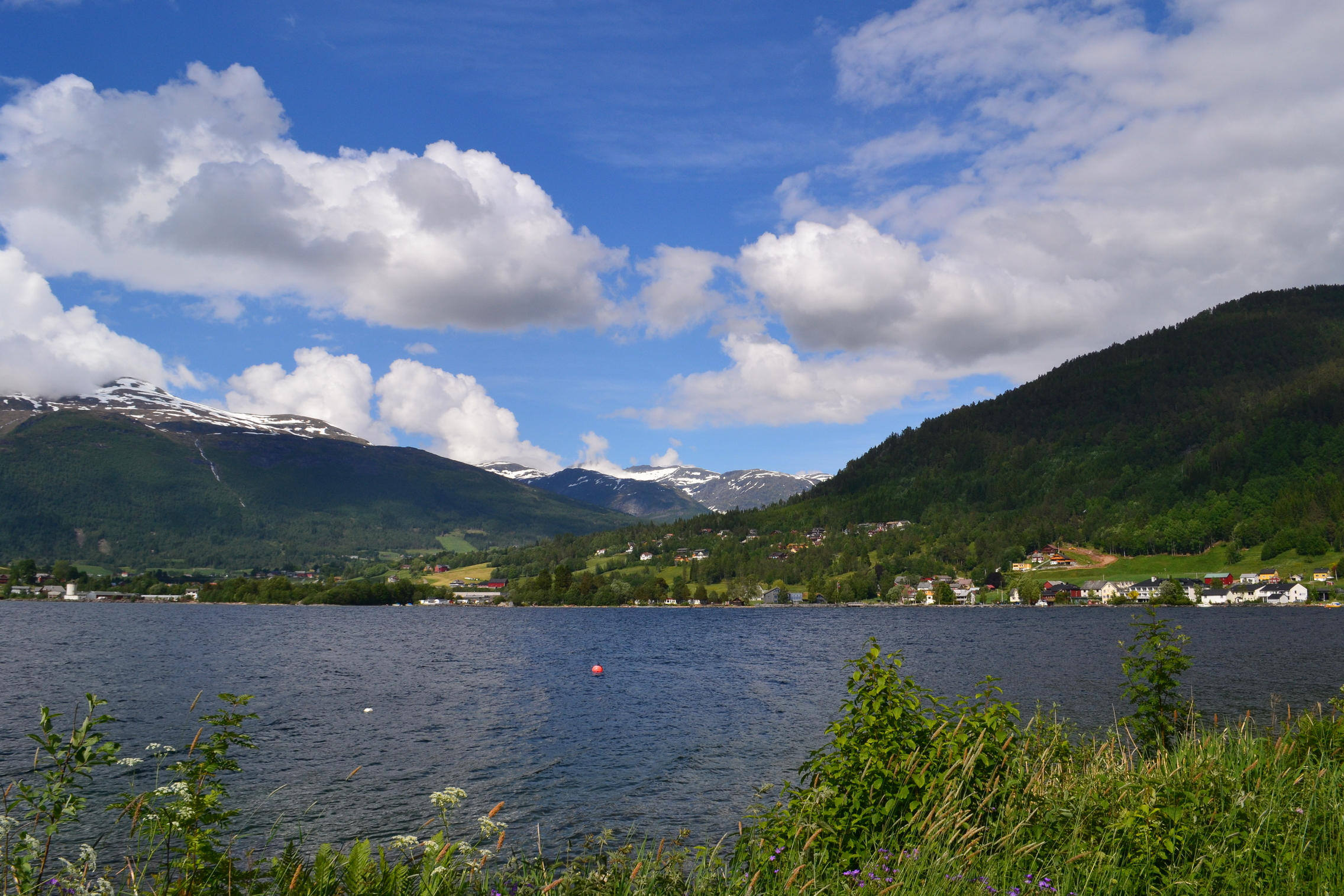

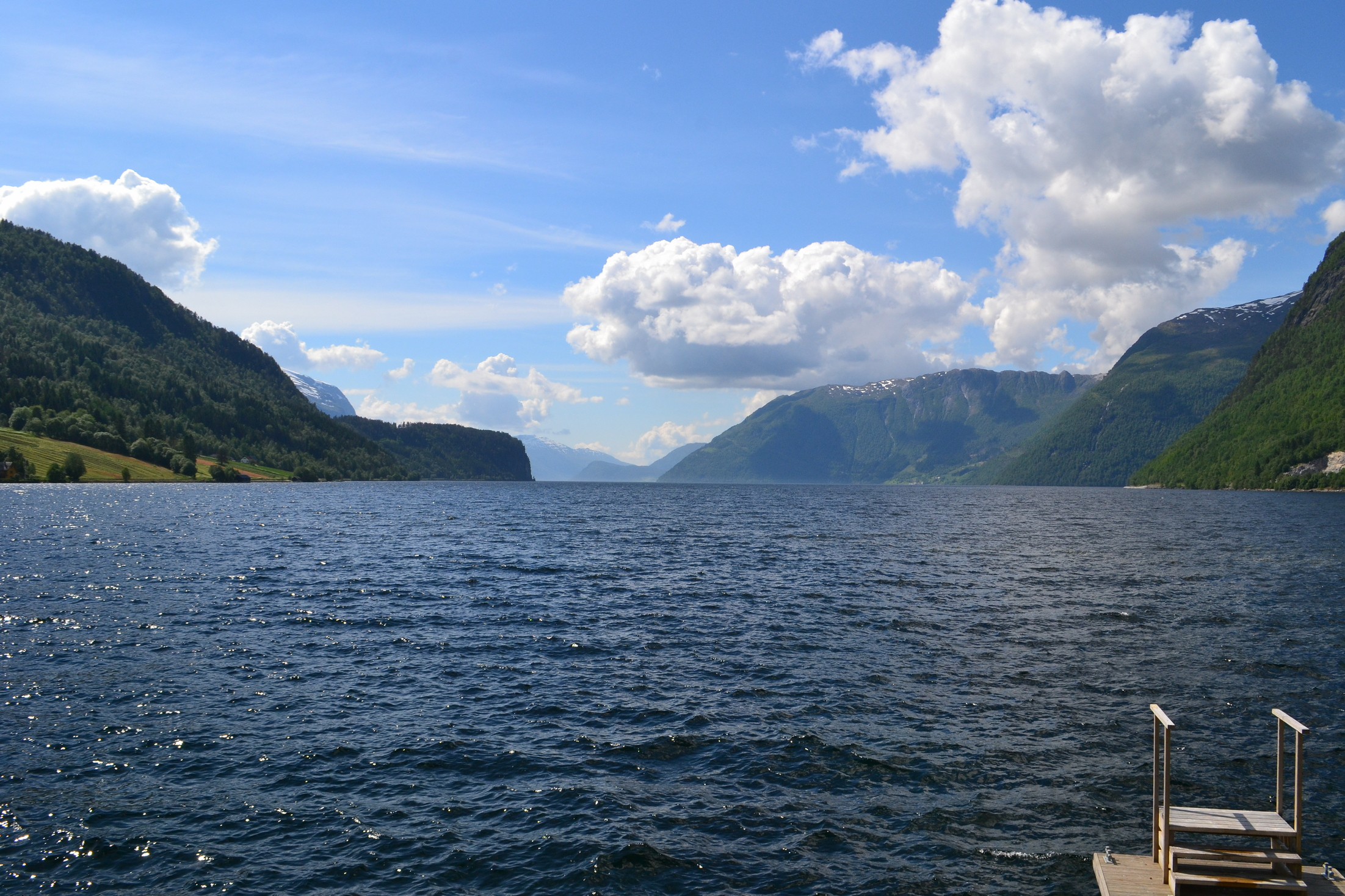

== See also ==
- List of lakes of Norway
