= Innvik Municipality =

Former municipality in Sogn og Fjordane county, Norway

Innvik Municipality Innvik herad
- Former municipality
- Indviken herred (historic name)
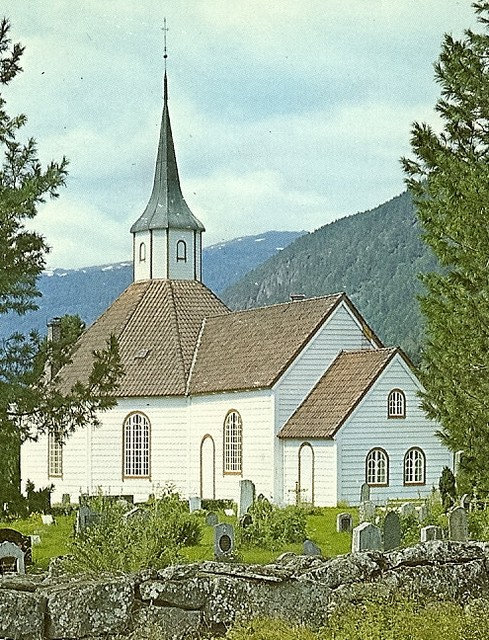
- View of the local Innvik Church

- Sogn og Fjordane within Norway

- Innvik within Sogn og Fjordane
- Coordinates: 61°51′06″N 06°37′00″E
- Country: Norway
- County: Sogn og Fjordane
- District: Nordfjord
- Established: 1 Jan 1838
  - Created as: Formannskapsdistrikt
- Disestablished: 1 Jan 1965
  - Succeeded by: Stryn Municipality
- Administrative centre: Innvik

Government
  - Mayor (1960-1964): Einar A. Skarstein

Area
  - Total: 492.8 km^{2} (190.3 sq mi)
  - Rank: #208 in Norway
- Highest elevation: 1,915 m (6,283 ft)

Population (1964)
  - Total: 3,035
  - Rank: #299 in Norway
  - Density: 6.2/km^{2} (16/sq mi)
  - Change (10 years): ▼ −2.9%

Official language
  - Norwegian form: Nynorsk
- Time zone: UTC+01:00 (CET)
  - Summer (DST): UTC+02:00 (CEST)
- ISO 3166 code: NO-1447

Innvik is a former municipality in the old Sogn og Fjordane county, Norway. The 492.8-square-kilometre (190.3 sq mi) municipality existed from 1838 until its dissolution in 1964. The area is now part of Stryn Municipality in the traditional district of Nordfjord in Vestland county. The administrative centre was the village of Innvik. Other villages in the municipality included Randabygda, Nordsida, Utvik, and Olden.

Prior to its dissolution in 1965, the 492.8-square-kilometre (190.3 sq mi) municipality was the 208th largest by area out of the 525 municipalities in Norway. Innvik Municipality was the 299th most populous municipality in Norway with a population of about 3,035. The municipality's population density was 6.2 inhabitants per square kilometre (16/sq mi) and its population had decreased by 2.9% over the previous 10-year period.

== General information ==
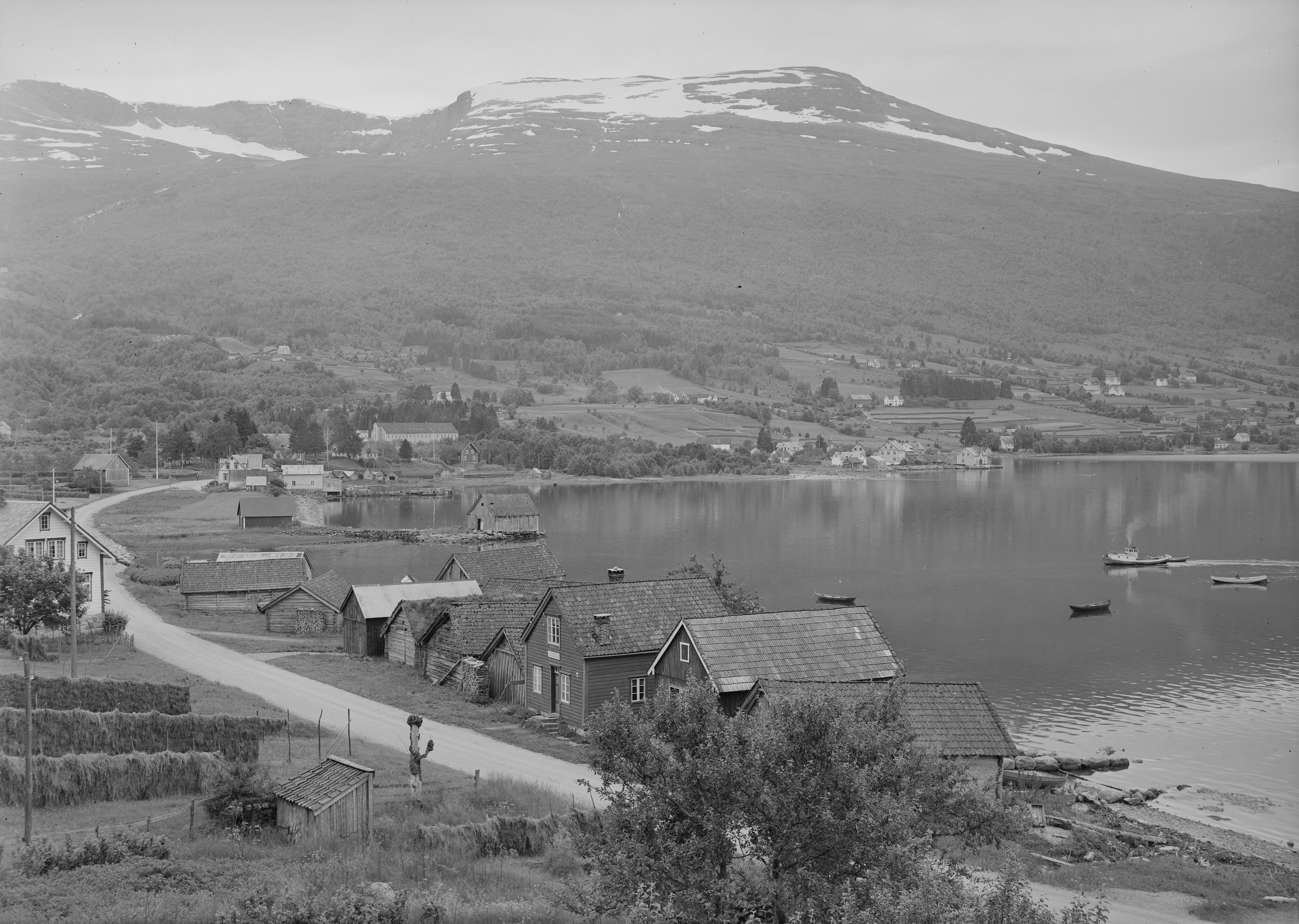
View of the village of Innvik (c. 1940s)

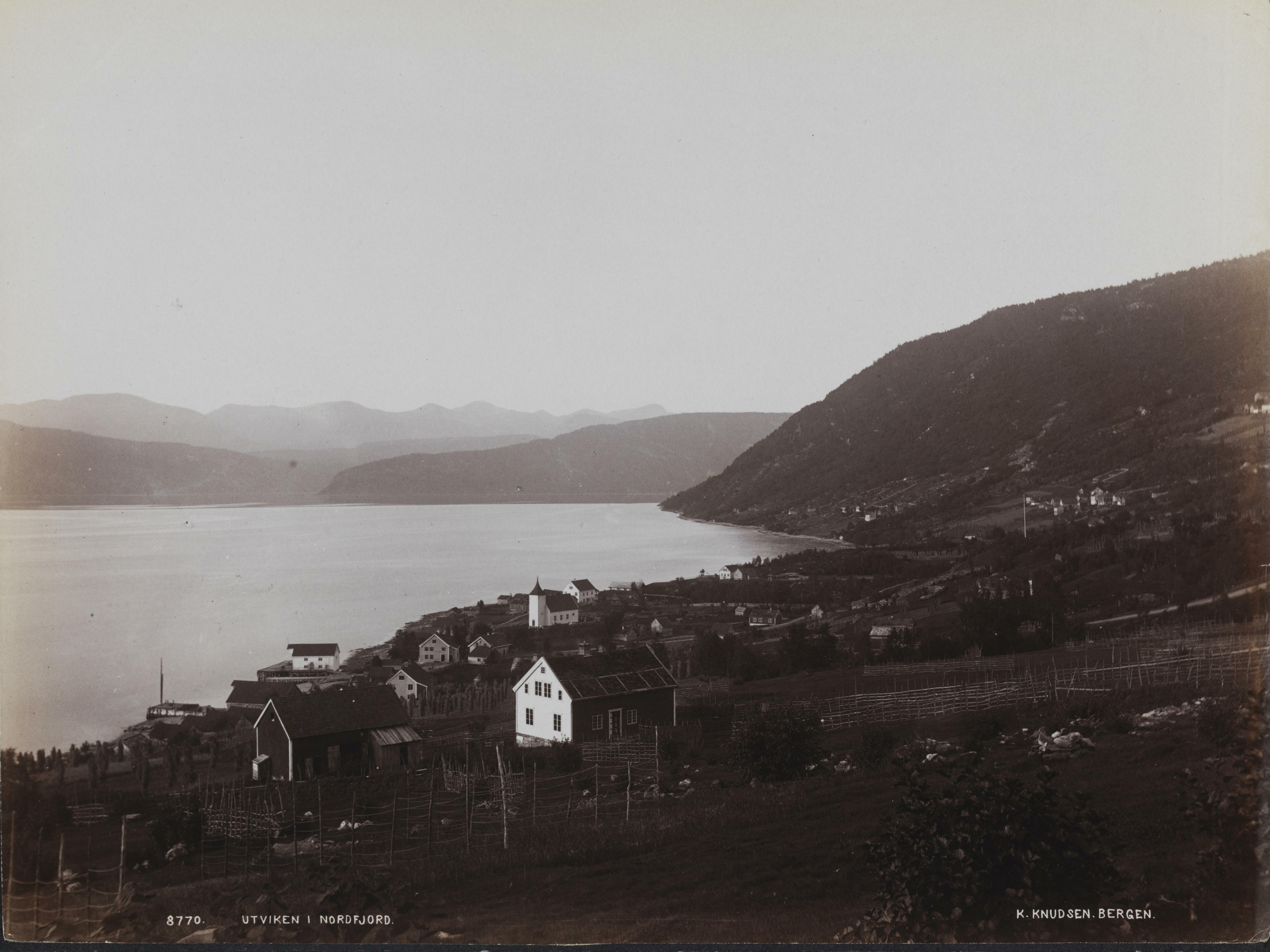
View of Utvik (c. 1890)

The parish of Indvigen (later spelled "Innvik") was established as a municipality on 1 January 1838 (see formannskapsdistrikt law). In 1843, the municipality was divided. The eastern part of the municipality (population: 2,401) formed the new Stryn Municipality and the western part of the municipality (population: 2,675) remained as a much smaller Innvik Municipality

On 1 October 1922, the Raksgrenda area (between the villages of Loen and Stryn), with 120 inhabitants, was administratively transferred from Innvik Municipality to Stryn Municipality.

During the 1960s, there were many municipal mergers across Norway due to the work of the Schei Committee. On 1 January 1965, the following areas were merged to form a new, much larger Stryn Municipality:

- all of Innvik Municipality (population: 3,003)
- all of Stryn Municipality (population: 2,982)
- the Hopland area of Gloppen Municipality (population: 42)
- the parts of Hornindal Municipality that were located east of Navelsaker and Holmøyvik (population: 1,184)

=== Name ===
The municipality (originally the parish) is named after the old Innvik farm (Old Norse: Víkr) since the first Innvik Church was built there. The original name was the plural form of the word vík which means "small bay", "cove", or "inlet". Some time around the 15th century, the prefix inn (which means "inside" or "inner") was added to distinguish the area from nearby Utvik (meaning "outer" Vik). Historically, the name of the municipality was spelled Indviken. On 3 November 1917, a royal resolution changed the spelling of the name of the municipality to Innvik, removing the definite form ending -en and using an "inn" instead of more Danish spelling of "ind".

=== Churches ===
The Church of Norway had three parishes (sokn) within Innvik Municipality. At the time of the municipal dissolution, it was part of the Innvik prestegjeld and the Nordfjord prosti (deanery) in the Diocese of Bjørgvin.

Churches in Innvik Municipality
Parish (sokn)	Church name	Location of the church	Year built
Innvik	Innvik Church	Innvik	1822
Olden	Olden Church	Olden	1934
Olden	Old Olden Church	Olden	1759
Olden	Ljosheim Chapel	Mykløy in Oldedalen	1924
Utvika	Utvik Church	Utvik	1840
Utvika	Randabygd Chapel	Randabygda	1916

== Geography ==
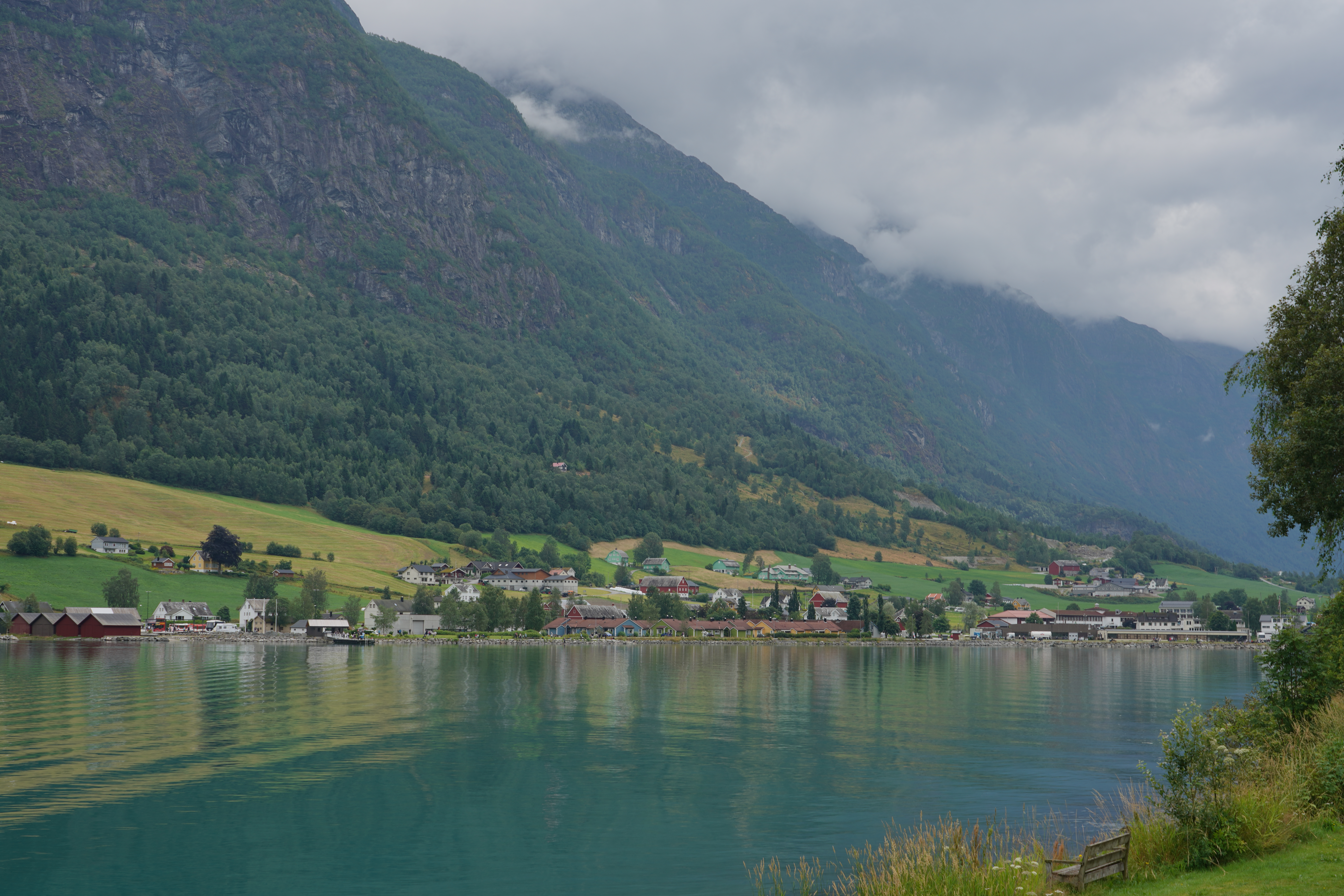
View of Olden

The municipality encompassed the western third of the present Stryn Municipality. Innvik Municipality included both sides of the Nordfjorden, from Randabygda in the west to just west of the village of Stryn. It stretched from the border with Hornindal Municipality in the north, through the Oldedalen valley all the way to the Jostedalsbreen glacier in the south. The highest point in the municipality was the 1,915-metre (6,283 ft) tall mountain Kvitekoll, located on the border with Hafslo Municipality.

Hornindal Municipality was located to the north, Stryn Municipality was located to the east, Hafslo Municipality was located to the south, Jølster Municipality was located to the southwest, Breim Municipality was located to the west, and Gloppen Municipality was located to the northwest.

== Government ==
While it existed, Innvik Municipality was responsible for primary education (through 10th grade), outpatient health services, senior citizen services, welfare and other social services, zoning, economic development, and municipal roads and utilities. The municipality was governed by a municipal council of directly elected representatives. The mayor was indirectly elected by a vote of the municipal council. The municipality was under the jurisdiction of the Gulating Court of Appeal.

=== Municipal council ===
The municipal council (Heradsstyre) of Innvik Municipality was made up of 25 representatives that were elected to four year terms. The tables below show the historical composition of the council by political party.

Innvik heradsstyre 1959–1963
Party name (in Nynorsk)	Number of representatives
Labour Party (Arbeidarpartiet)	2
Christian Democratic Party (Kristeleg Folkeparti)	2
Centre Party (Senterpartiet)	8
Liberal Party (Venstre)	3
Local List(s) (Lokale lister)	10
Total number of members:	25
Note: On 1 January 1965, Innvik Municipality became part of Stryn Municipality.

Innvik heradsstyre 1955–1959
Party name (in Nynorsk)	Number of representatives
Labour Party (Arbeidarpartiet)	3
Local List(s) (Lokale lister)	22
Total number of members:	25

Innvik heradsstyre 1951–1955
Party name (in Nynorsk)	Number of representatives
Labour Party (Arbeidarpartiet)	4
Christian Democratic Party (Kristeleg Folkeparti)	2
Joint List(s) of Non-Socialist Parties (Borgarlege Felleslister)	9
Local List(s) (Lokale lister)	9
Total number of members:	24

Innvik heradsstyre 1947–1951
Party name (in Nynorsk)	Number of representatives
Labour Party (Arbeidarpartiet)	3
Christian Democratic Party (Kristeleg Folkeparti)	2
Local List(s) (Lokale lister)	19
Total number of members:	24

Innvik heradsstyre 1945–1947
Party name (in Nynorsk)	Number of representatives
Labour Party (Arbeidarpartiet)	2
Liberal Party (Venstre)	1
List of workers, fishermen, and small farmholders (Arbeidarar, fiskarar, småbrukarar liste)	1
Joint List(s) of Non-Socialist Parties (Borgarlege Felleslister)	4
Local List(s) (Lokale lister)	16
Total number of members:	24

Innvik heradsstyre 1937–1941*
Party name (in Nynorsk)	Number of representatives
Labour Party (Arbeidarpartiet)	4
Farmers' Party (Bondepartiet)	2
Liberal Party (Venstre)	2
Joint List(s) of Non-Socialist Parties (Borgarlege Felleslister)	9
Local List(s) (Lokale lister)	7
Total number of members:	24
Note: Due to the German occupation of Norway during World War II, no elections were held for new municipal councils until after the war ended in 1945.

=== Mayors ===
The mayor (Nynorsk: ordførar) of Innvik Municipality was the political leader of the municipality and the chairperson of the municipal council. The following people have held this position:

- 1838–1841: Peter L. Brandt
- 1842–1843: Jørgen Fredrik Spørck
- 1844–1844: Arent Uchermann
- 1845–1845: Lars Olson Bruvoll
- 1846–1849: Ola Olson Flore
- 1850–1851: Anders Rasmusson Faleide
- 1852–1857: Ola Olson Flore
- 1858–1861: Hans Andersson Heggdal
- 1862–1871: Ola Hansson Langve
- 1872–1883: Anders H. Faleide
- 1884–1895: Anders H. Øiestad
- 1895–1908: Rasmus Elias Paulson Sindre (V)
- 1908–1910: Anders A. Drageset
- 1910–1931: Knut A. Taraldset
- 1932–1942: Hallvard R. Sindre
- 1942–1946: Anders J. Rustøen
- 1946–1951: Per Reme
- 1952–1959: Ola Bruland
- 1960–1964: Einar A. Skarstein

== See also ==
- List of former municipalities of Norway
