= Innvik =

Innvik may refer to:

== Places ==
- Innvik Municipality, a former municipality in the old Sogn og Fjordane county, Norway
- Innvik (village), a village in Stryn Municipality in Vestland county, Norway
- Innvik Church, a church in Stryn Municipality in Vestland county, Norway

== Other ==
- Innvik power plant, a hydroelectric power station in Stryn Municipality in Vestland county, Norway
