= Rune Skarstein =

Norwegian economist (born 1940)

Rune Skarstein (born 7 April 1940) is a Norwegian radical economist employed at the Norwegian University of Science and Technology (NTNU) in Trondheim, Norway. Skarstein was born on 7 April 1940 in the village of Olden in Nordfjord in Western Norway.

He graduated as a chartered engineer at the Norwegian Institute of Technology (now part of NTNU), with an emphasis on construction and building. He continued his education and obtained a PhD in social economy in 1974. He has worked at CMI in Bergen, later in Tanzania, and since 1980 he has worked for the University of Trondheim (UNiT) which is now part of NTNU.

== Main interests ==
- Developmental economy
- Editor-in-chief for the journal «Vardøger» (tutelary deity) from its beginning.
- Member of the Socialist Left Party and was twice inaugurated as a member of Trondheim City Council.
