= Svein Lundevall =

Norwegian civil servant

Svein Lundevall (born 28 May 1944) is a Norwegian civil servant.

He was born in Oslo and grew up in Hermansverk and Førde. He completed his secondary education in Sandane. He studied at the University of Oslo and Lund University, and took the cand.polit. degree in 1975. He worked in the Norwegian Ministry of Finance from 1971 to 1977. In 1977, he became the chief administrative officer (fylkesrådmann) of Sogn og Fjordane County Municipality. He held the position for twenty years, until 1997. He later worked as a consultant.

In 1993, he applied unsuccessfully, for the position as County Governor of Sogn og Fjordane. After resigning as chief administrative officer, he applied unsuccessfully for the positions of chief administrative officer in Porsgrunn Municipality, chief administrative officer in Vindafjord Municipality, and director of Innlandet health trust.

Lundevall was the chair of Vestlandsforskning in Sogndal Municipality from 1985 to 1990. He now lives in the village of Olden in Stryn Municipality.

Civic offices
Preceded by	Chief administrative officer of Sogn og Fjordane County Municipality; 1977–1997	Succeeded by Per Drageset
