= Per Drageset =

Norwegian civil servant (1944–2022)

Per Drageset (15 January 1944 – 12 November 2022) was a Norwegian civil servant.

Drageset was born in Innvik and grew up in Raudeberg. He graduated from the University of Oslo with the cand.oecon. degree in 1970, spent one year doing compulsory military service, and worked at the Norwegian Institute for Urban and Regional Research from 1971 to 1974. He started working in Sogn og Fjordane County Municipality in 1974, and was promoted to financial director in 1978. He was the chief executive officer of Førde Central Hospital from 1980 to 1981, returned to being financial director before leaving in 1988. From 1989 to 1995, he was the chief executive officer of Fylkesbaatane. In 1995, he became Assisting County Governor of Sogn og Fjordane, and from 1997, he was the chief administrative officer (fylkesrådmann) of Sogn og Fjordane County Municipality, He retired in 2006.

His wife is from Innvik, and spent most of her career as a pharmacist in Sogndal Municipality. When she retired in 2005.

Drageset died in Sogndal on 12 November 2022.

Civic offices
Preceded by Svein Lundevall	Chief administrative officer of Sogn og Fjordane County Municipality; 1997–2006	Succeeded by Jan Øhlckers
