= Rasmus Sindre =

Norwegian farmer, newspaper editor and politician

Rasmus Elias Paulson Sindre (23 July 1859 – 3 April 1908) was a Norwegian farmer, newspaper editor, and politician. He took over the farm Sindre in Nordfjord when his father died in 1882. He represented the party Venstre, being mayor of the Innvik Municipality from 1895, thereafter elected to the Parliament of Norway in 1899, serving for the period 1900–02. From 1895 to 1901 he was also editor of the newspaper Fjordabladet of Nordfjordeid. He was married to Gyda Sindre (b. Støyva, 1858–1946), and they had 8 children together. He died of cancer only 48 years old.
