= Randabygd Church =

Church in Vestland, Norway

- Randabygd kyrkje
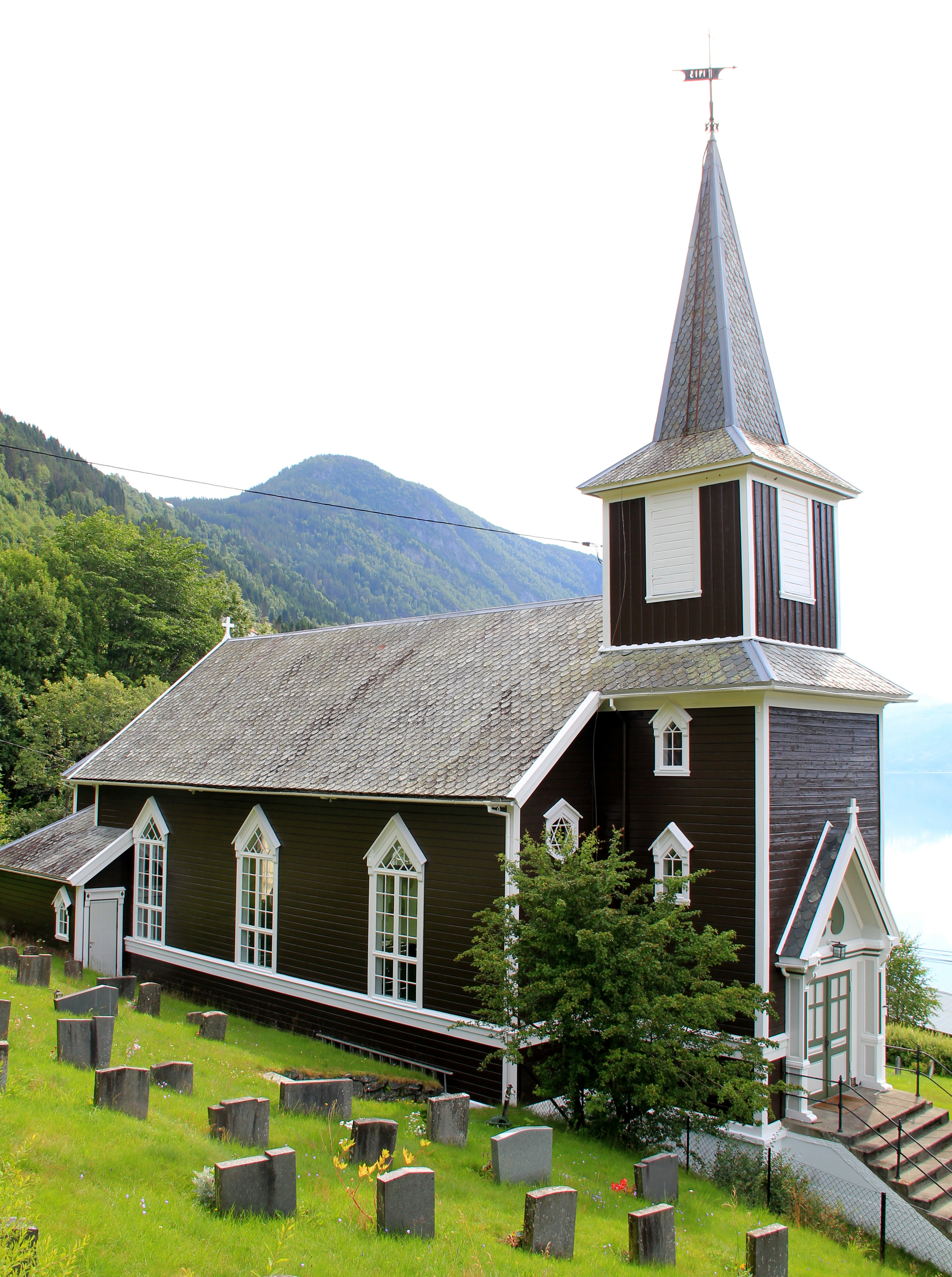
- View of the church
- Randabygd Church
- 61°51′49″N 6°19′15″E
- Location: Stryn Municipality, Vestland
- Country: Norway
- Denomination: Church of Norway
- Churchmanship: Evangelical Lutheran

History
- Former name: Randabygd Chapel
- Status: Parish church
- Founded: 1916
- Consecrated: 29 Aug 1916

Architecture
- Functional status: Active
- Architect: Jens Sølvberg
- Architectural type: Long church
- Completed: 1916 (110 years ago)

Specifications
- Capacity: 240
- Materials: Wood

Administration
- Diocese: Bjørgvin bispedømme
- Deanery: Nordfjord prosti
- Parish: Randabygd
- Norwegian Cultural Heritage Site
- Type: Church
- Status: Not protected
- ID: 85269

Randabygd Church (Norwegian: Randabygd kyrkje) is a parish church of the Church of Norway in Stryn Municipality in Vestland county, Norway. It is located in the village of Randabygda. It is the church for the Randabygd parish which is part of the Nordfjord prosti (deanery) in the Diocese of Bjørgvin. The brown, wooden church was built in a long church design in 1916 using plans drawn up by the architect Jens Sølvberg from Bryggja. The church seats about 240 people.

== History ==
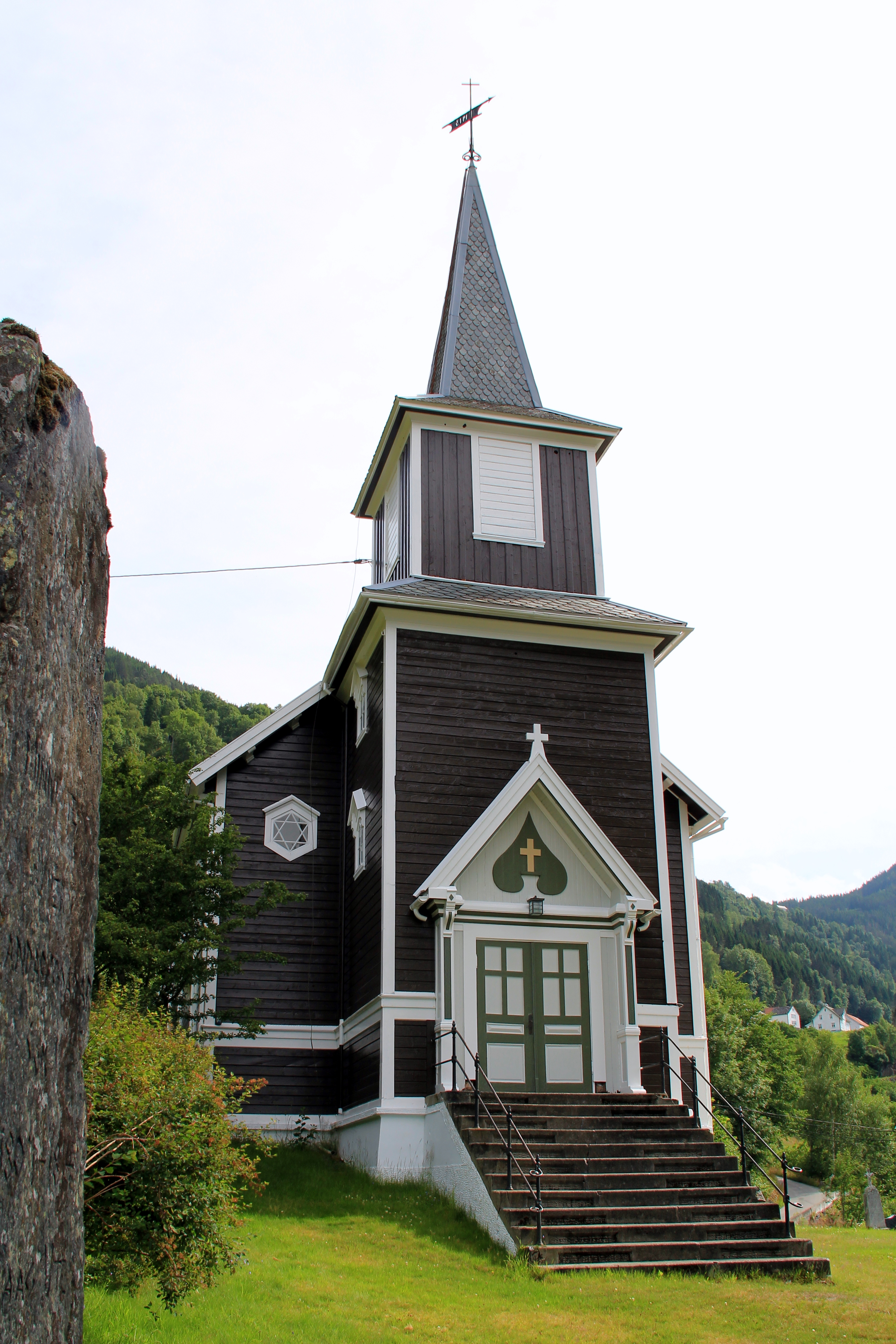
View of the front entrance

The residents of the Randabygda area had a 13-kilometre (8.1 mi) long journey across a large fjord to attend their parish church, Utvik Church. The local people wanted the Utvik Church moved about 10 kilometres (6.2 mi) to the northwest of the church to the village of Tisam. This would make the church more centrally located within the parish. These demands were rejected repeatedly by the parish for a number of years. Then in 1910, approval for a cemetery in Randabygda were approved. Not long afterwards, approval for the construction of an annex chapel was finally given. The architect Jens Sølvberg was hired to design the building and Rasmus Olsen Gald was hired as the lead builder for the project. Construction of the church took place in 1915-1916. The church is a wooden long church with a church porch on the west end with a tower above it. The choir is located on the east end of the nave. There is a sacristy on the north side of the choir. The church was consecrated on 29 August 1916 by the Bishop Peter Hognestad. It originally was an annex chapel in the Utvik Church parish. In 1967, it became an annex chapel under the Hornindal Church parish. Also that year, the church had electric heating installed and part of the basement was rebuilt as bathrooms. On 1 January 1981, it was upgraded to full parish church status and it was renamed Randabygd Church.

== See also ==
- List of churches in Bjørgvin
