= Jørgen Fredrik Spørck =

Norwegian politician and military officer (1787–1866)

Jørgen Fredrik Spørck (1787–1866) was a Norwegian military officer and politician.

As a politician, he served as mayor in Innvik Municipality from 1842 to 1843. He was also a deputy representative to the Norwegian Parliament.
