= Olden, Norway =

Village in Stryn Municipality, Norway

Olden
- Village
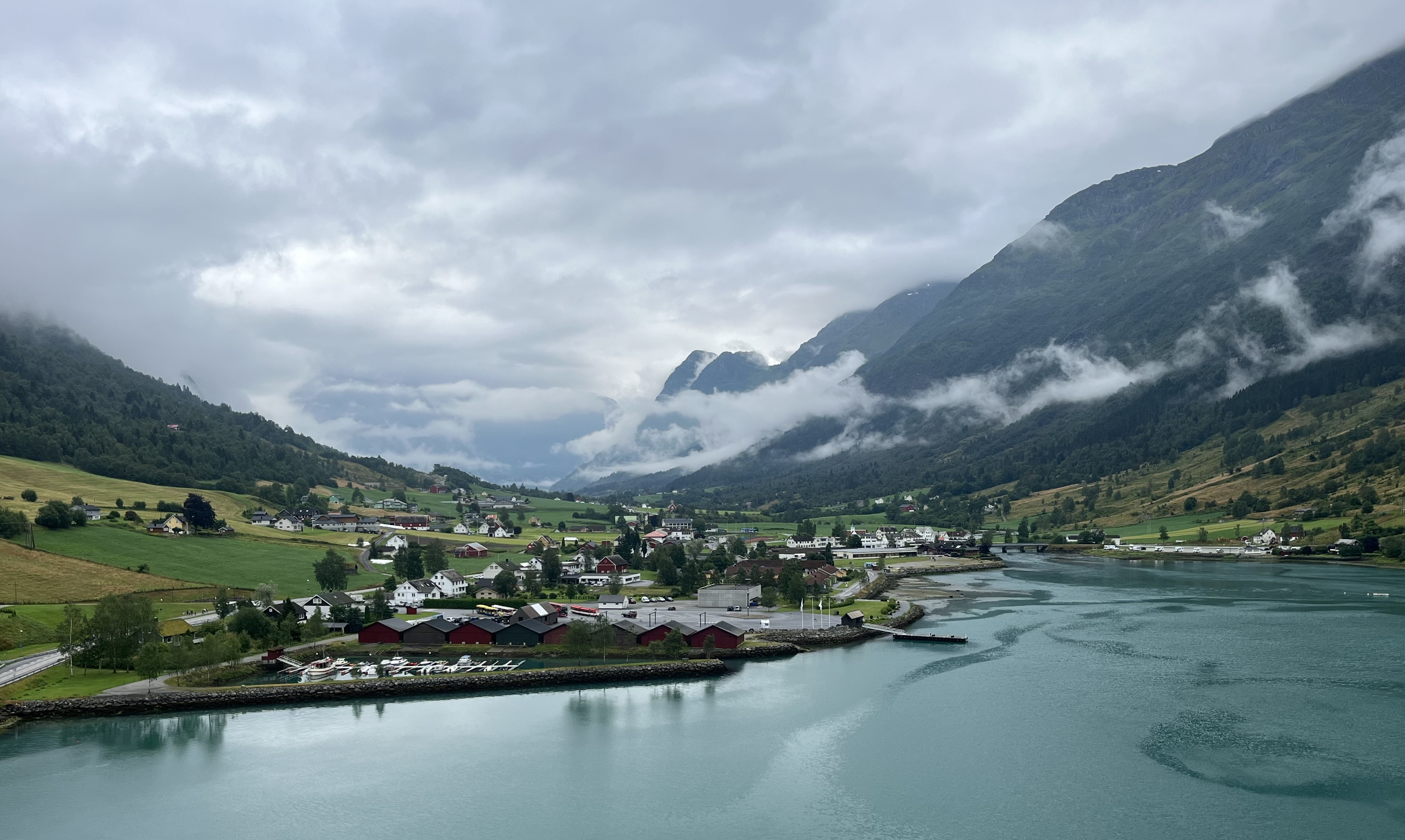
- Olden Norway
- Interactive map of Olden
- Location within Vestland Location within Norway
- Coordinates: 61.8328°N 6.8080°E
- Country: Norway
- Region: Western Norway
- County: Vestland
- District: Nordfjord
- Municipality: Stryn Municipality

Area
  - Total: 0.61 km^{2} (0.24 sq mi)
- Elevation: 131 m (430 ft)

Population (2024)
  - Total: 522
  - Density: 856/km^{2} (2,220/sq mi)
- Time zone: UTC+01:00 (CET)
  - Summer (DST): UTC+02:00 (CEST)
- Post Code: 6788 Olden

Olden is a village in Stryn Municipality in Vestland county, Norway. It is located at the mouth of the Oldeelva river and northern end of the Oldedalen valley on the southern shore of the Nordfjorden, 6 kilometres (3.7 mi) southwest of the village of Loen, 16 kilometres (9.9 mi) southeast of Stryn, and 15 kilometres (9.3 mi) east of the village of Innvik.

The 0.61-square-kilometre (150-acre) village has a population (2024) of 522 and a population density of 856 inhabitants per square kilometre (2,220/sq mi).

== Attractions ==
Olden is a major tourist area. The cruise port in Olden had 102 cruise ship arrivals in 2019. The Briksdalsbreen glacier, a popular hiking destination, is located about 25 kilometres (16 mi) south of Olden, at the end of the Oldedalen valley. It is a small arm off the main Jostedalsbreen glacier. There are two churches in Olden, the Old Olden Church (built in 1759) and Olden Church (built in 1934). Despite its relatively small population the village does contain several shops including a high-end clothes shop, a supermarket and a few gift shops.

== Notable people ==
- Svein Lundevall (born 1944), a Norwegian civil servant
- Rune Skarstein (born 1940), a radical economist

== Media gallery ==
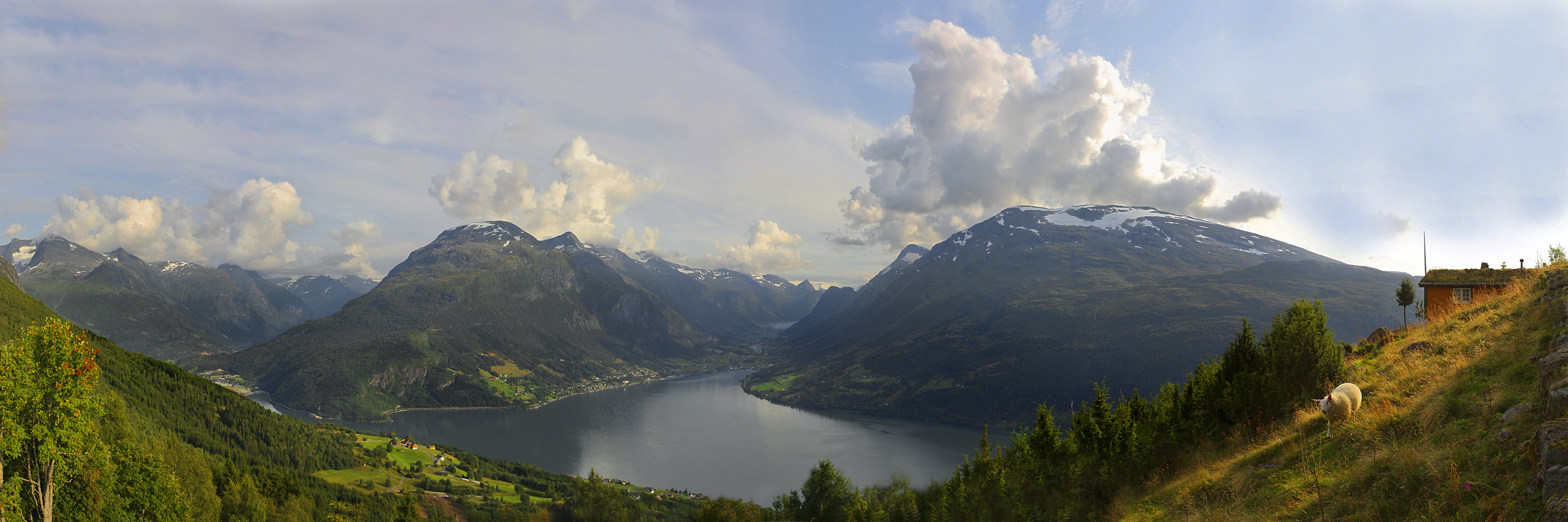
Panoramic view of mountains surrounding Olden

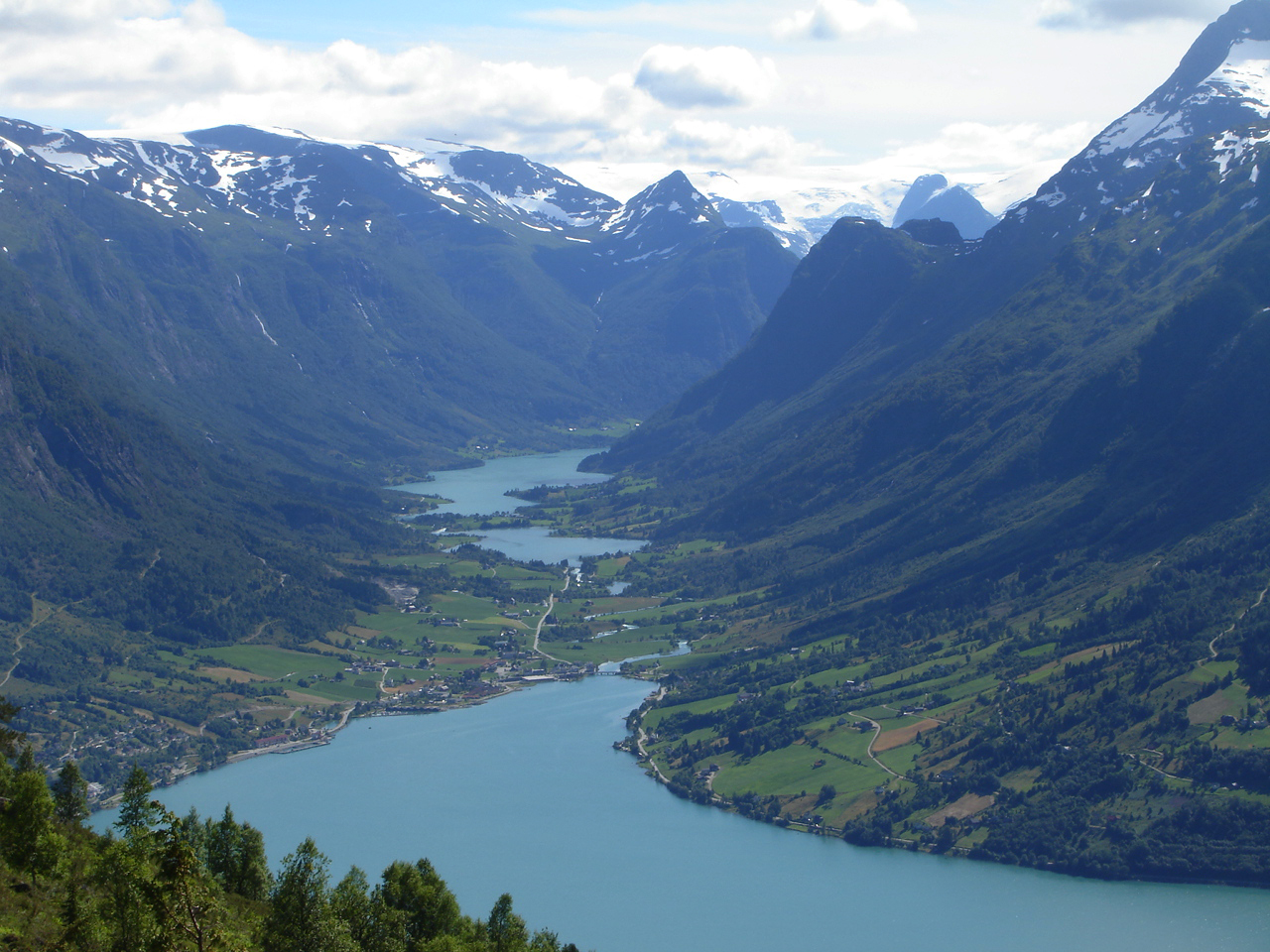
Olden by the shores of Oldebukta, a terminal bay in Nordfjorden

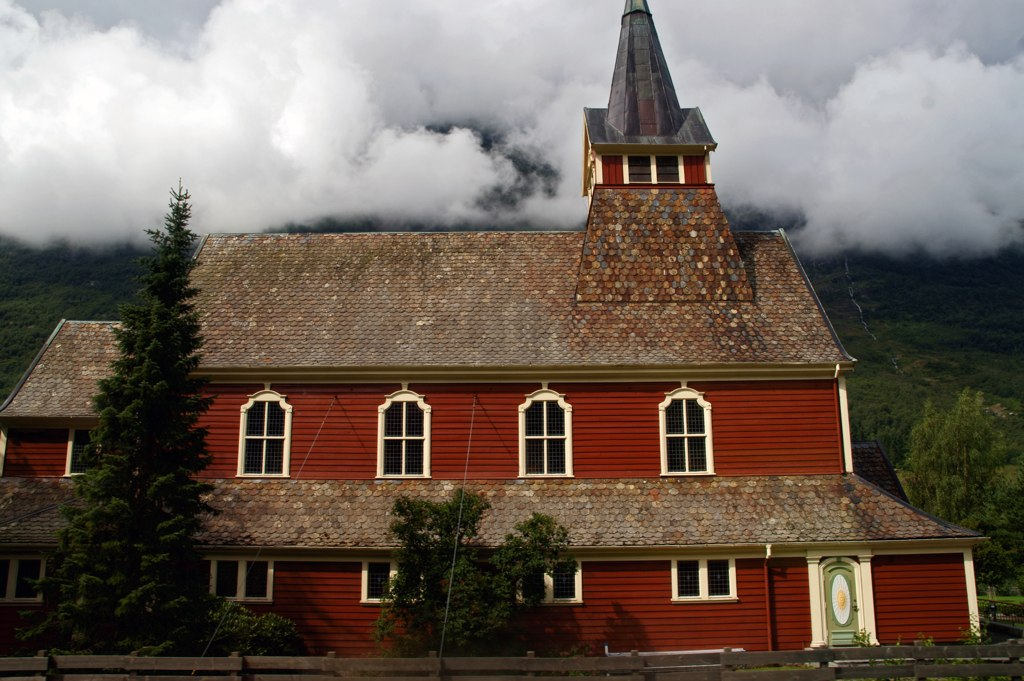
The "new" Olden Church, built in 1934

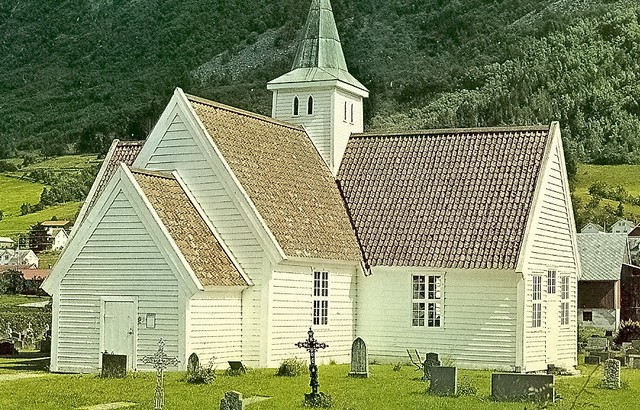
The "old" Olden church, built in 1759

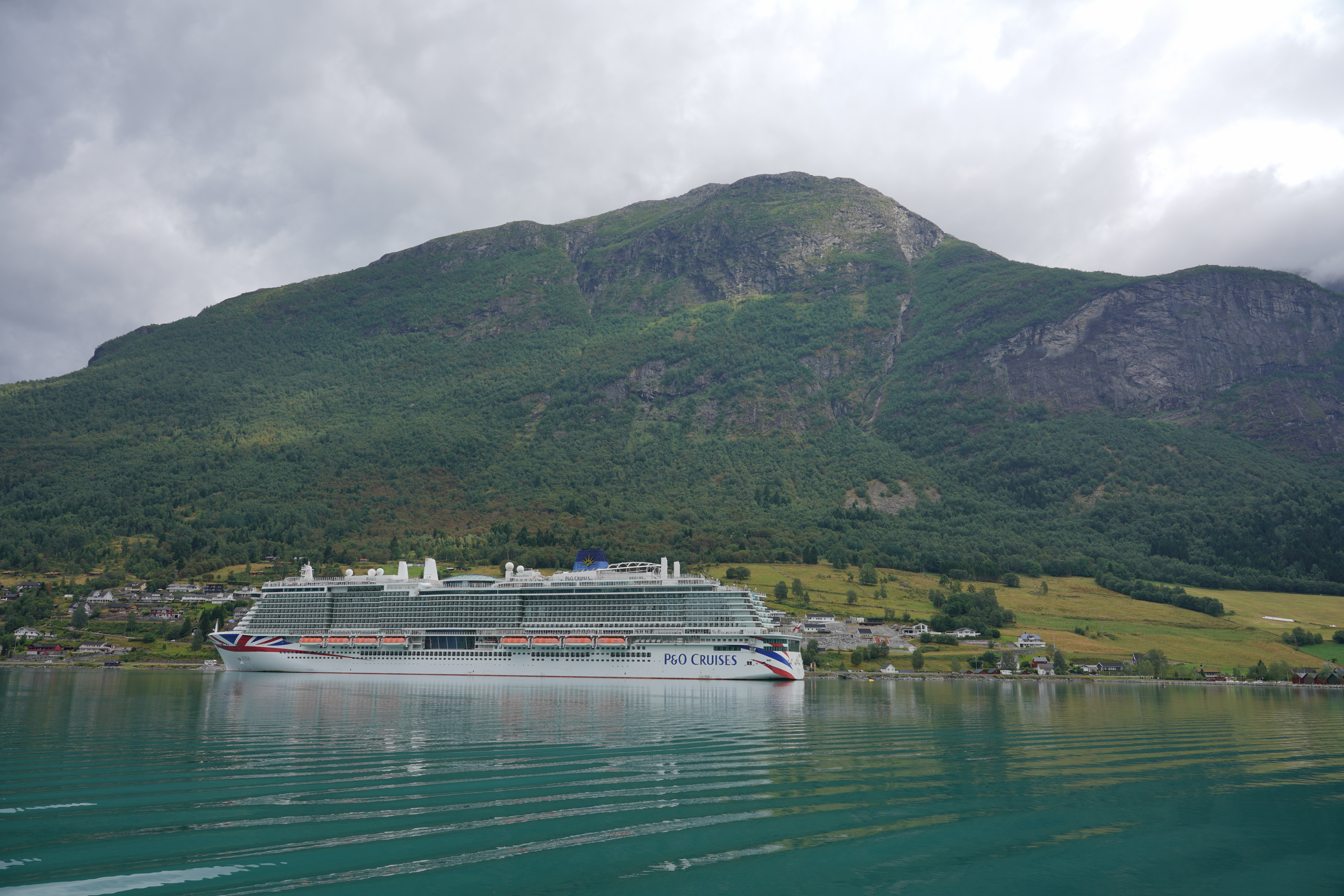
Cruise ship docked at Olden
