= Ljosheim Chapel =

Church in Vestland, Norway

- Ljosheim kapell
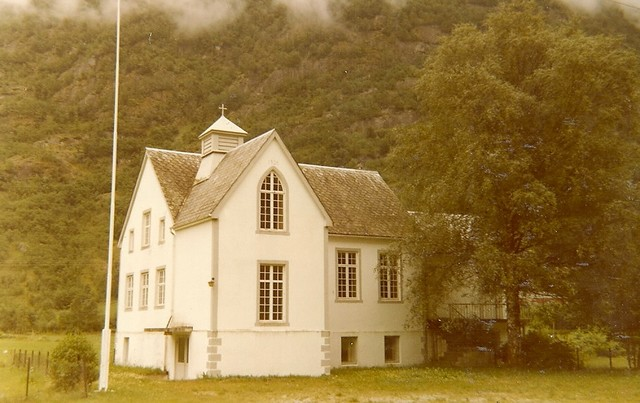
- View of the chapel
- Ljosheim Chapel
- 61°41′56″N 6°48′30″E
- Location: Stryn Municipality, Vestland
- Country: Norway
- Denomination: Church of Norway
- Churchmanship: Evangelical Lutheran

History
- Status: Chapel
- Founded: 1924
- Consecrated: 22 Oct 1935

Architecture
- Functional status: Active
- Architect: Andreas Sande
- Completed: 1924 (102 years ago)

Specifications
- Capacity: 100
- Materials: Stone

Administration
- Diocese: Bjørgvin bispedømme
- Deanery: Nordfjord prosti
- Parish: Olden
- Norwegian Cultural Heritage Site
- Type: Church
- Status: Not protected
- ID: 84313

Ljosheim Chapel (Norwegian: Ljosheim kapell) is a chapel of the Church of Norway in Stryn Municipality in Vestland county, Norway. It is located in the village of Mykløy at the southern end of the Oldedalen valley. It is an annex chapel in the Olden parish which is part of the Nordfjord prosti (deanery) in the Diocese of Bjørgvin. The white, concrete chapel was built in 1924 using plans drawn up by the architect Andreas Sande. The chapel seats about 100 people.

== History ==
The building was constructed in 1924 as a bedehus (a prayer house used for some church functions). In 1935, the building was renovated to give it a choir and sacristy so that it could be upgraded to the status of annex chapel. After the renovation the chapel had a long church design. The building was consecrated as a chapel on 22 October 1935. In 1970-1971, the entrance and the sacristy were expanded, and the rooms in the basement were renovated.

== See also ==
- List of churches in Bjørgvin
