= Utvik Church =

Church in Vestland, Norway

- Utvik kyrkje
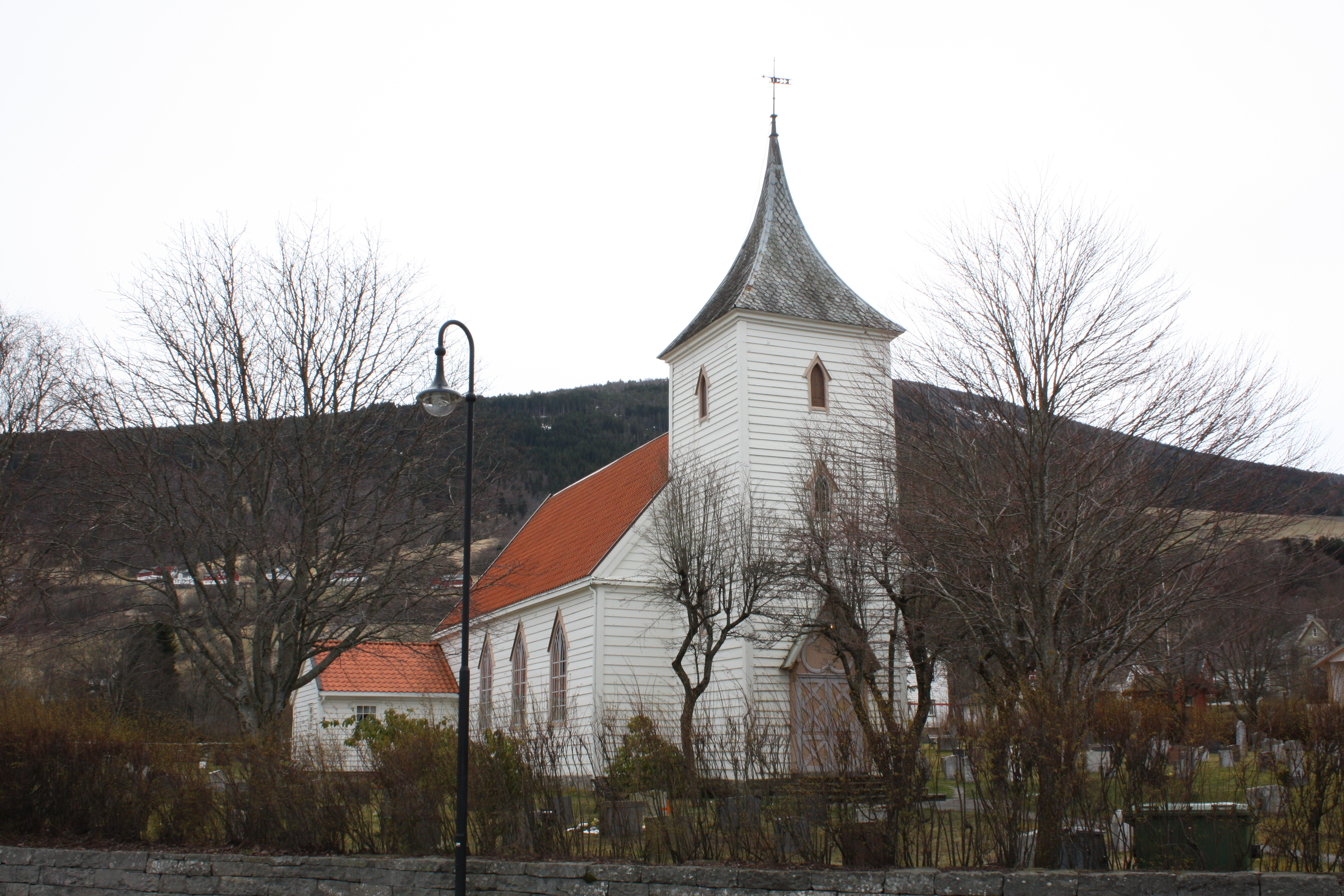
- View of the church
- Utvik Church
- 61°48′25″N 6°31′13″E
- Location: Stryn Municipality, Vestland
- Country: Norway
- Denomination: Church of Norway
- Churchmanship: Evangelical Lutheran

History
- Status: Parish church
- Founded: 13th century
- Consecrated: 29 Nov 1840

Architecture
- Functional status: Active
- Architect: Hans Linstow
- Architectural type: Long church
- Style: Neo-Gothic
- Completed: 1840 (186 years ago)

Specifications
- Capacity: 350
- Materials: Wood

Administration
- Diocese: Bjørgvin bispedømme
- Deanery: Nordfjord prosti
- Parish: Utvik
- Norwegian Cultural Heritage Site
- Type: Church
- Status: Automatically protected
- ID: 85736

Utvik Church (Norwegian: Utvik kyrkje) is a parish church of the Church of Norway in Stryn Municipality in Vestland county, Norway. It is located in the village of Utvik. It is the church for the Utvik parish which is part of the Nordfjord prosti (deanery) in the Diocese of Bjørgvin. The white, wooden church was built in a long church design in 1840 using plans drawn up by the architect Hans Linstow. The church seats about 350 people.

== History ==
The earliest existing historical records of the church date back to the year 1330, but the church was not new at that time. The first church was a wooden stave church that was likely built during the 13th century. The medieval church apparently existed until the early 17th century when it was torn down. In 1617, a new timber-framed cruciform church was built on the same site to replace the previous church. In 1840, the church was torn down and a new church was built on the same site. The new building was a wooden long church that was designed in a neo-Gothic style by the architect Hans Linstow. The building was consecrated on 29 November 1840. In 1902, the church was renovated. The choir was enlarged and the east wall was in the shape of a half-octagon. In 1968, the choir was again enlarged, making it back into a rectangular shape as well as adding a sacristy and bathroom.

== Media gallery ==
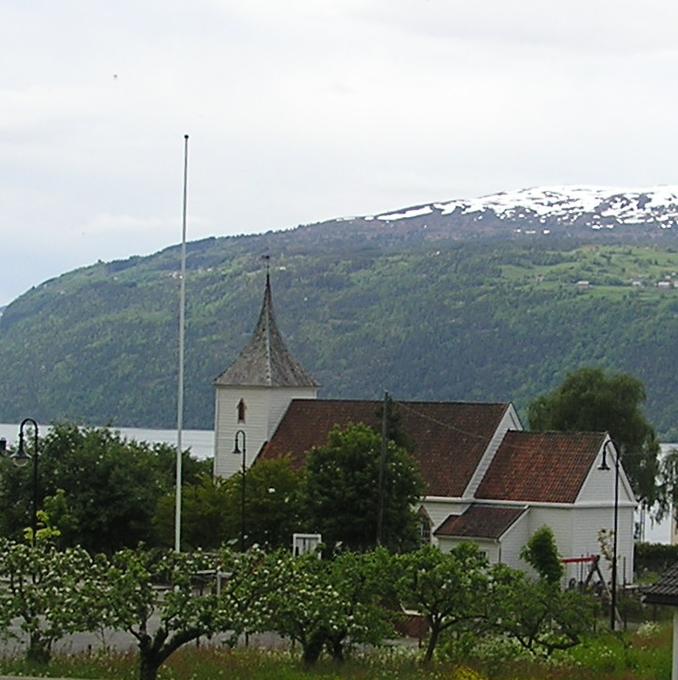

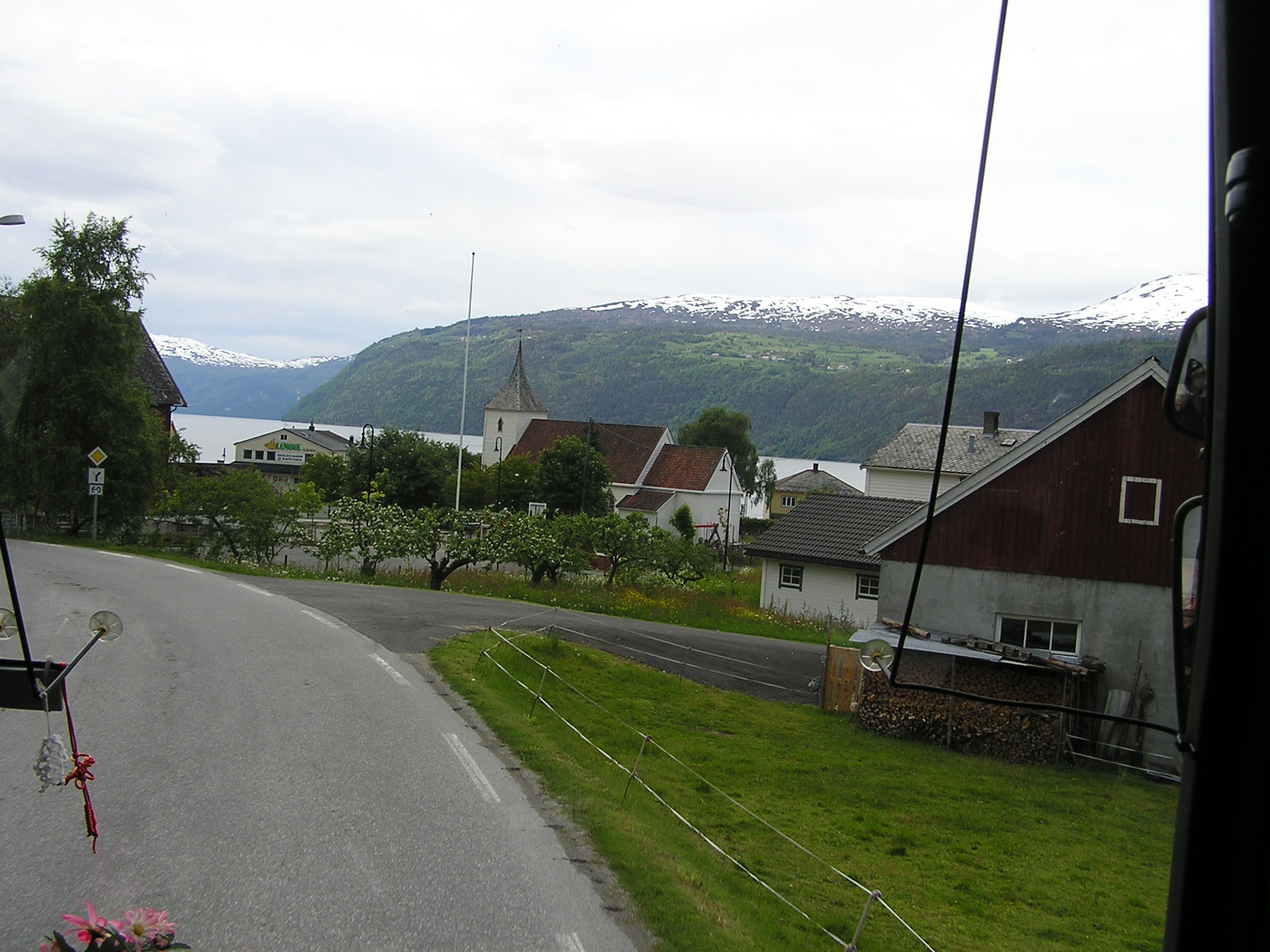

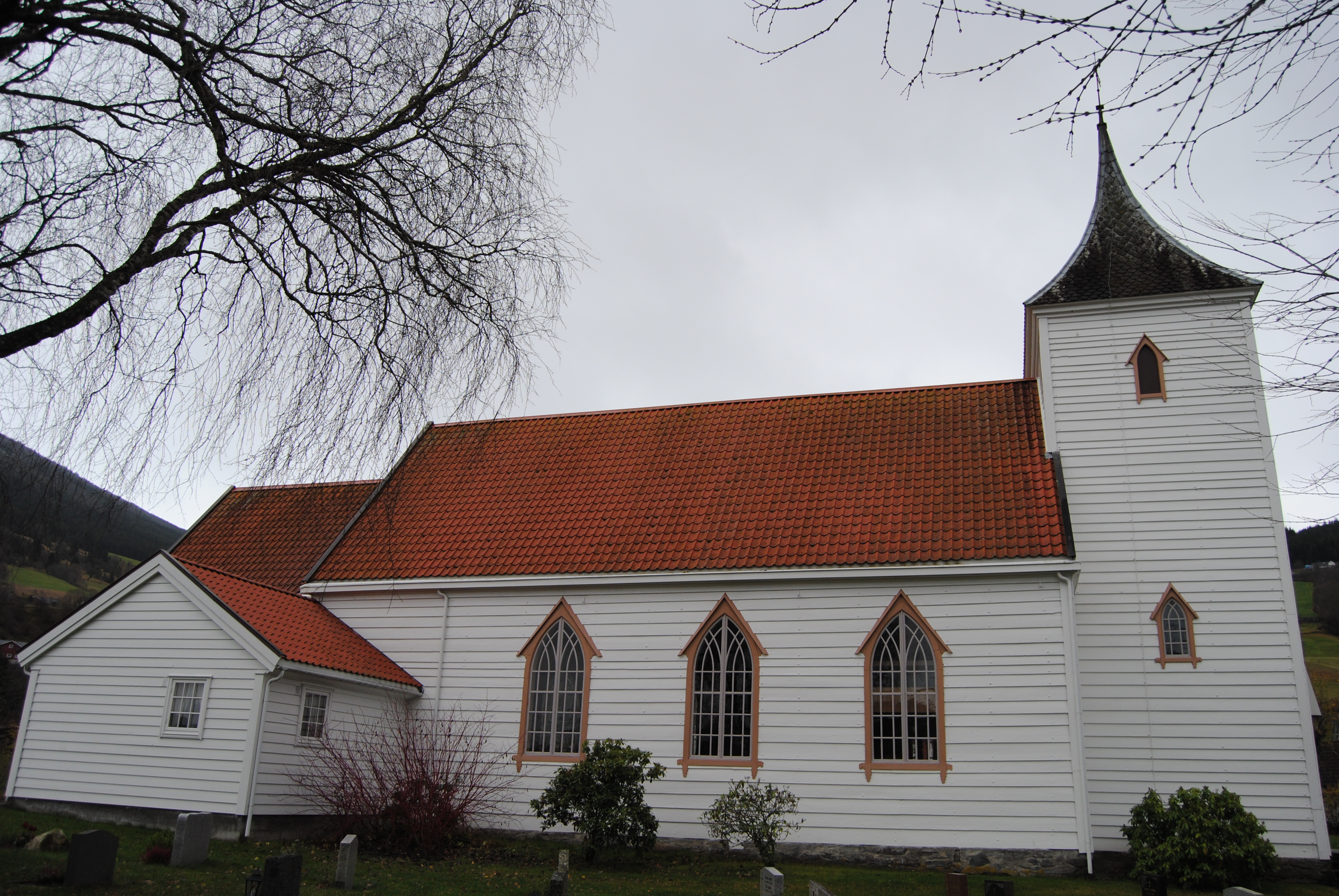

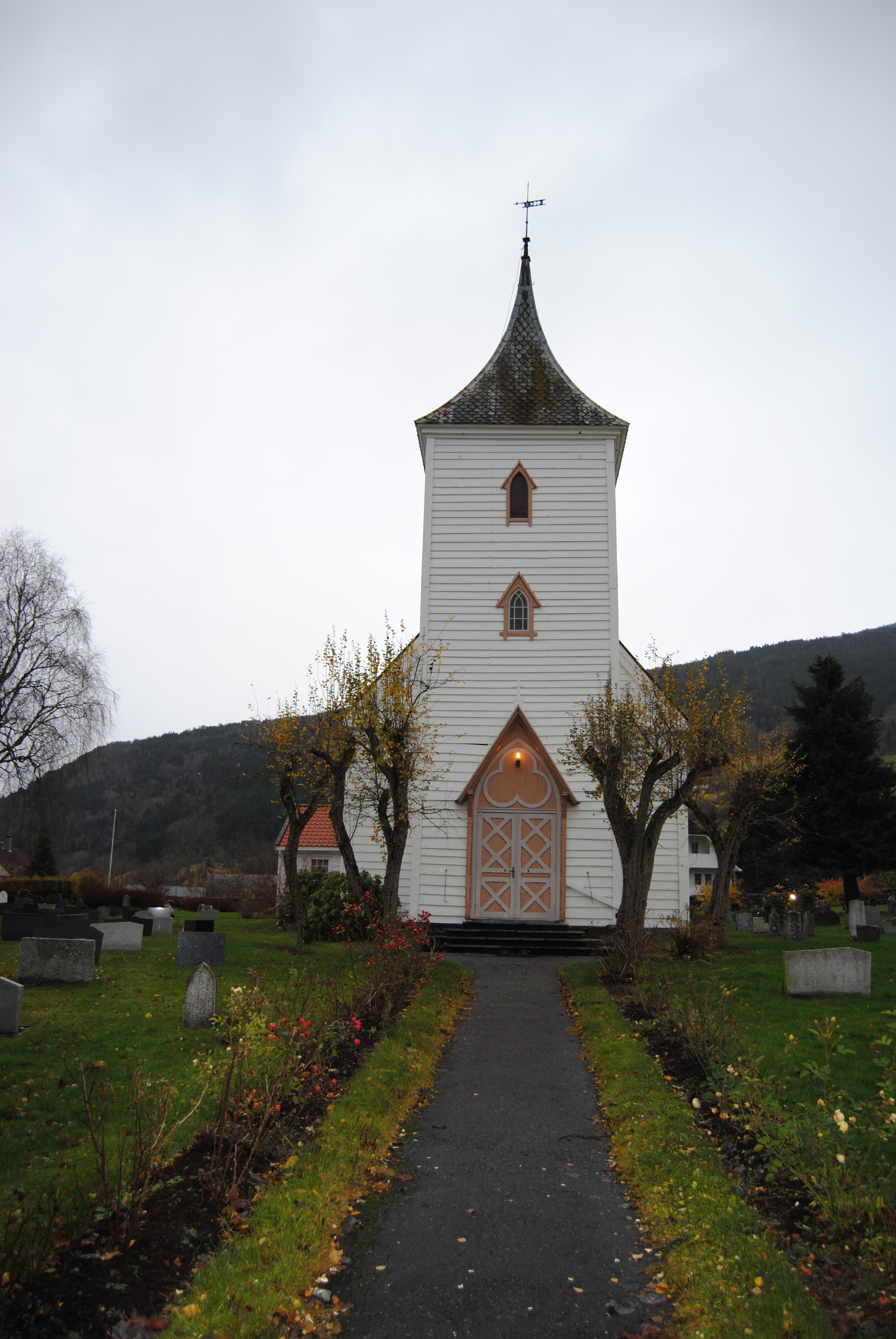

== See also ==
- List of churches in Bjørgvin
