= Innvik Church =

Church in Vestland, Norway

- Innvik kyrkje
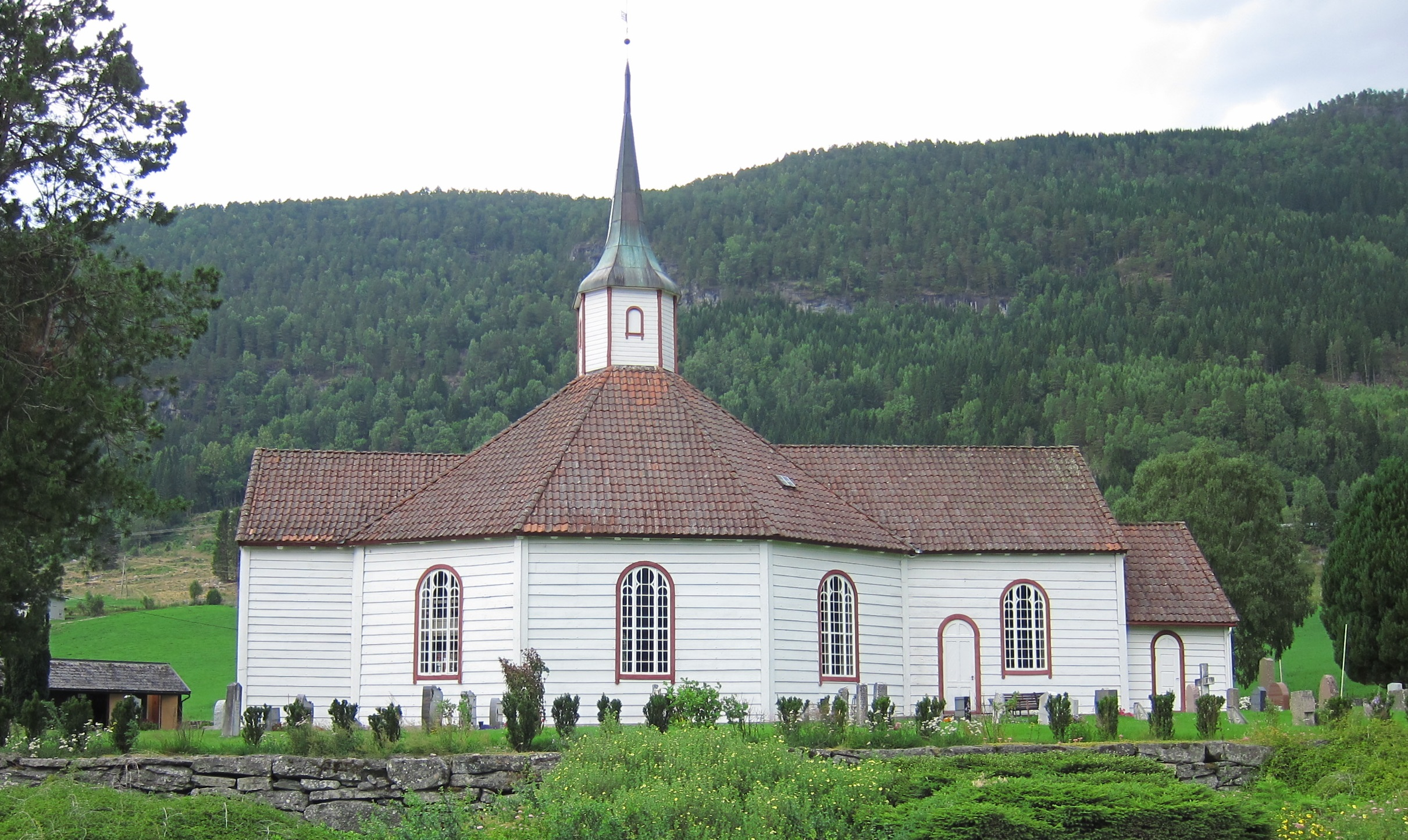
- View of the church
- Innvik Church
- 61°51′13″N 6°37′01″E
- Location: Stryn Municipality, Vestland
- Country: Norway
- Denomination: Church of Norway
- Churchmanship: Evangelical Lutheran

History
- Status: Parish church
- Founded: 13th century
- Consecrated: 28 July 1824

Architecture
- Functional status: Active
- Architect: Elling Olsson Walbøe
- Architectural type: Octagonal
- Completed: 1822 (204 years ago)

Specifications
- Capacity: 350
- Materials: Wood

Administration
- Diocese: Bjørgvin bispedømme
- Deanery: Nordfjord prosti
- Parish: Innvik
- Norwegian Cultural Heritage Site
- Type: Church
- Status: Automatically protected
- ID: 84726

Innvik Church (Norwegian: Innvik kyrkje) is a parish church of the Church of Norway in Stryn Municipality in Vestland county, Norway. It is located in the village of Innvik. It is the church for the Innvik parish which is part of the Nordfjord prosti (deanery) in the Diocese of Bjørgvin. The white, wooden church was built in an octagonal design in 1822 using plans drawn up by the architect Elling Olsen Waldboe. The church seats about 350 people.

== History ==
The earliest existing historical records of the church date back to the year 1330, but the church was not new that year. The first church in Innvik was a wooden stave church that was built at Hilde, about 600 metres (2,000 ft) east of the present site of the church. It was probably first constructed during the 13th century. In 1580, the church was dismantled and its materials were moved about 600 metres (2,000 ft) closer to the fjord, where it was rebuilt. When the church was being built on the new site, it was constructed in a long church design using a combination of stave church construction and timber-framed construction. In 1695, the church was inspected and found to be in poor condition so some renovations were carried out including the replacing the tower on the church with a new one.

In 1814, this church served as an election church (Norwegian: valgkirke). Together with more than 300 other parish churches across Norway, it was a polling station for elections to the 1814 Norwegian Constituent Assembly which wrote the Constitution of Norway. This was Norway's first national elections. Each church parish was a constituency that elected people called "electors" who later met together in each county to elect the representatives for the assembly that was to meet at Eidsvoll Manor later that year.

In 1820, the church measured 22 by 7 metres (72 ft × 23 ft) and it was deemed too small for the congregation. In 1822, the church was torn down and replaced with a new church with an octagonal design on the same site. The parish hired Elling Olsen Waldboe to design and build the new building. The tower on the new church was largely built using salvaged materials from the old church. The new church building was completed in 1822 and the first worship service was held on Christmas Day 1822. The church was not formally consecrated until 28 July 1824 by the Bishop Jacob Neumann. In 1899–1900, the church was renovated and enlarged. It was expanded to the east with a new choir and sacristy. It also got new window glass, its doors were replaced, and the interior fixtures were all redone. In 1914, the church had electric lights installed along with an organ. In 1961, electric heating was installed in the building.

== Media gallery ==
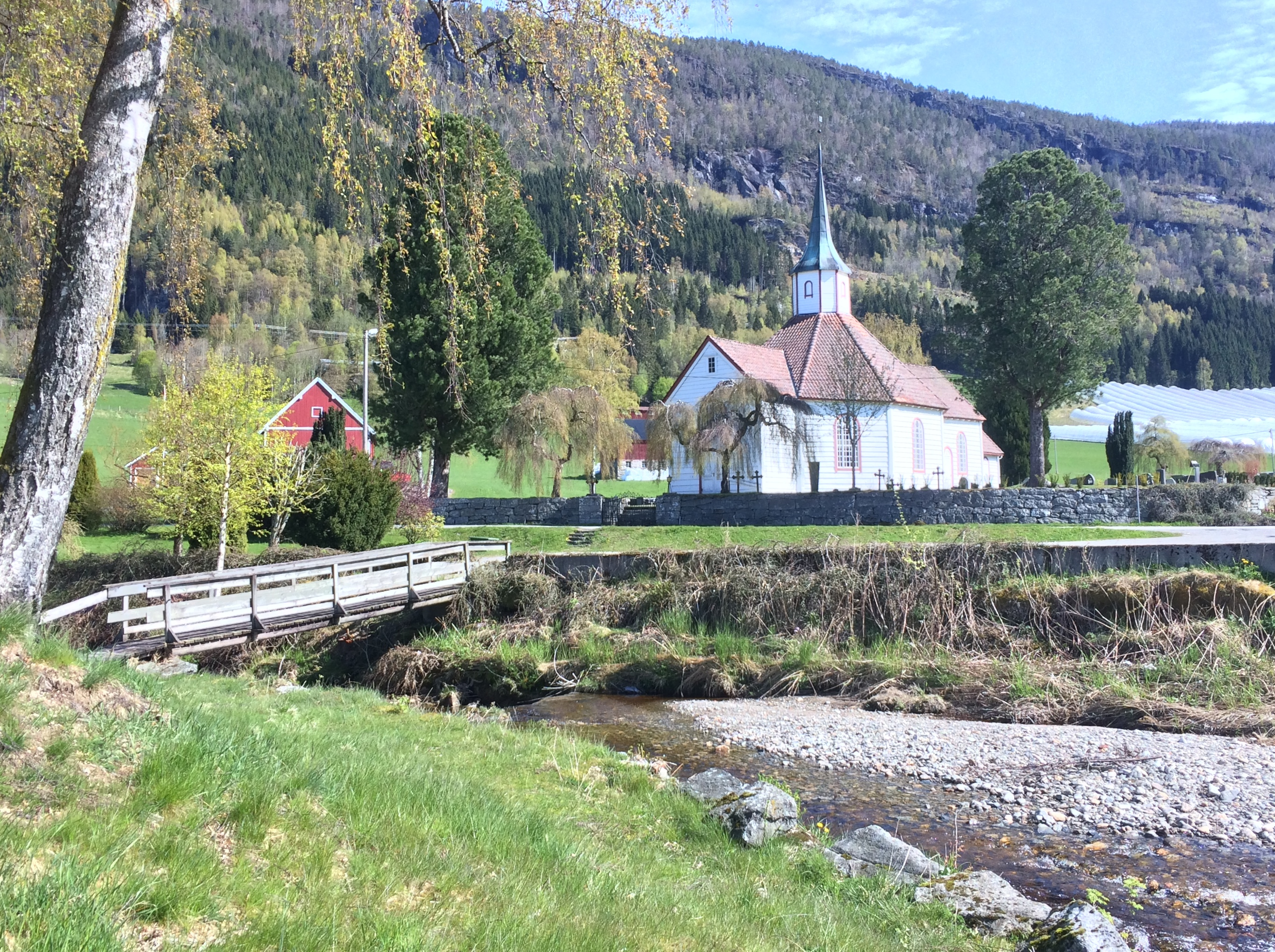

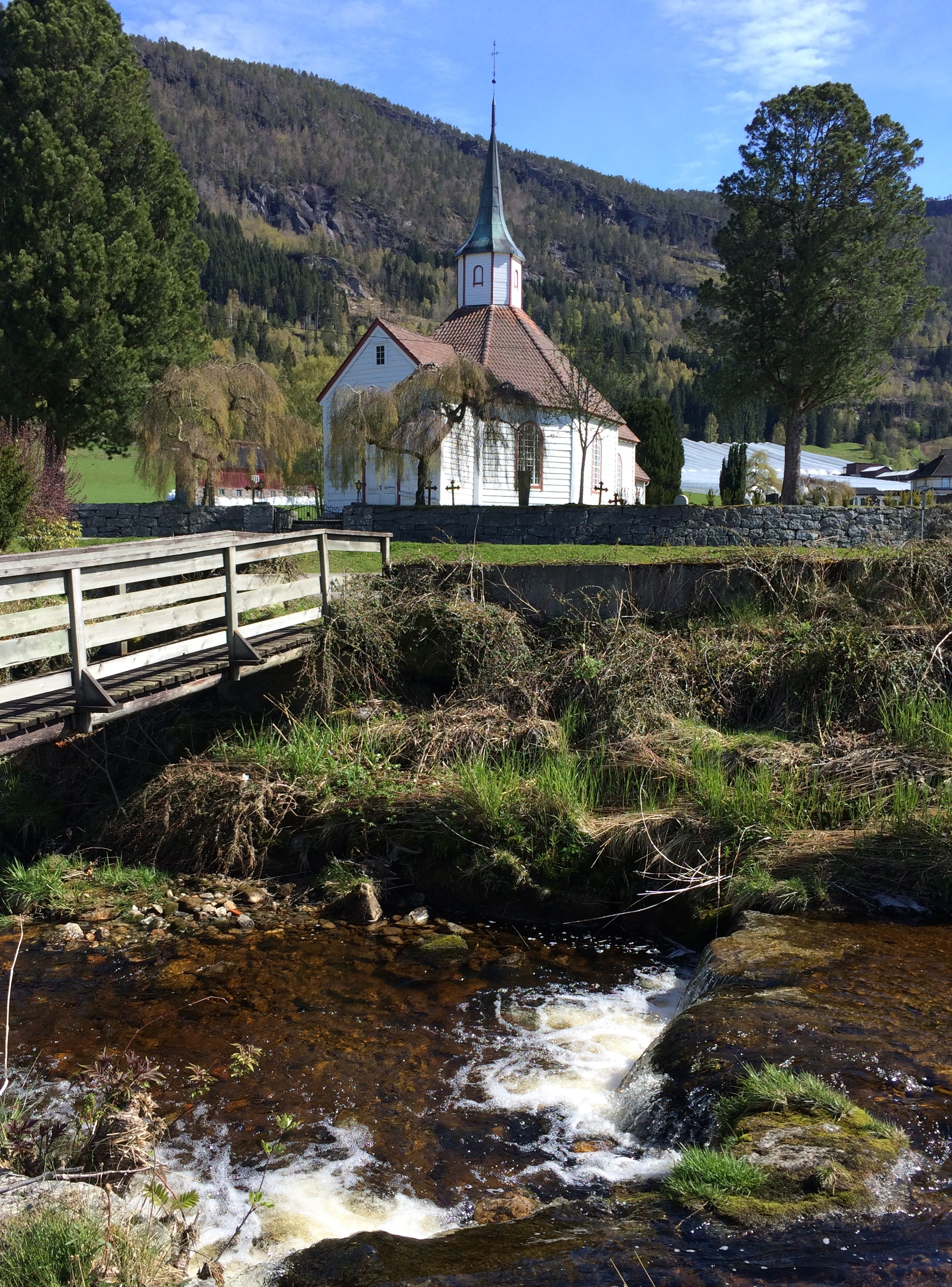

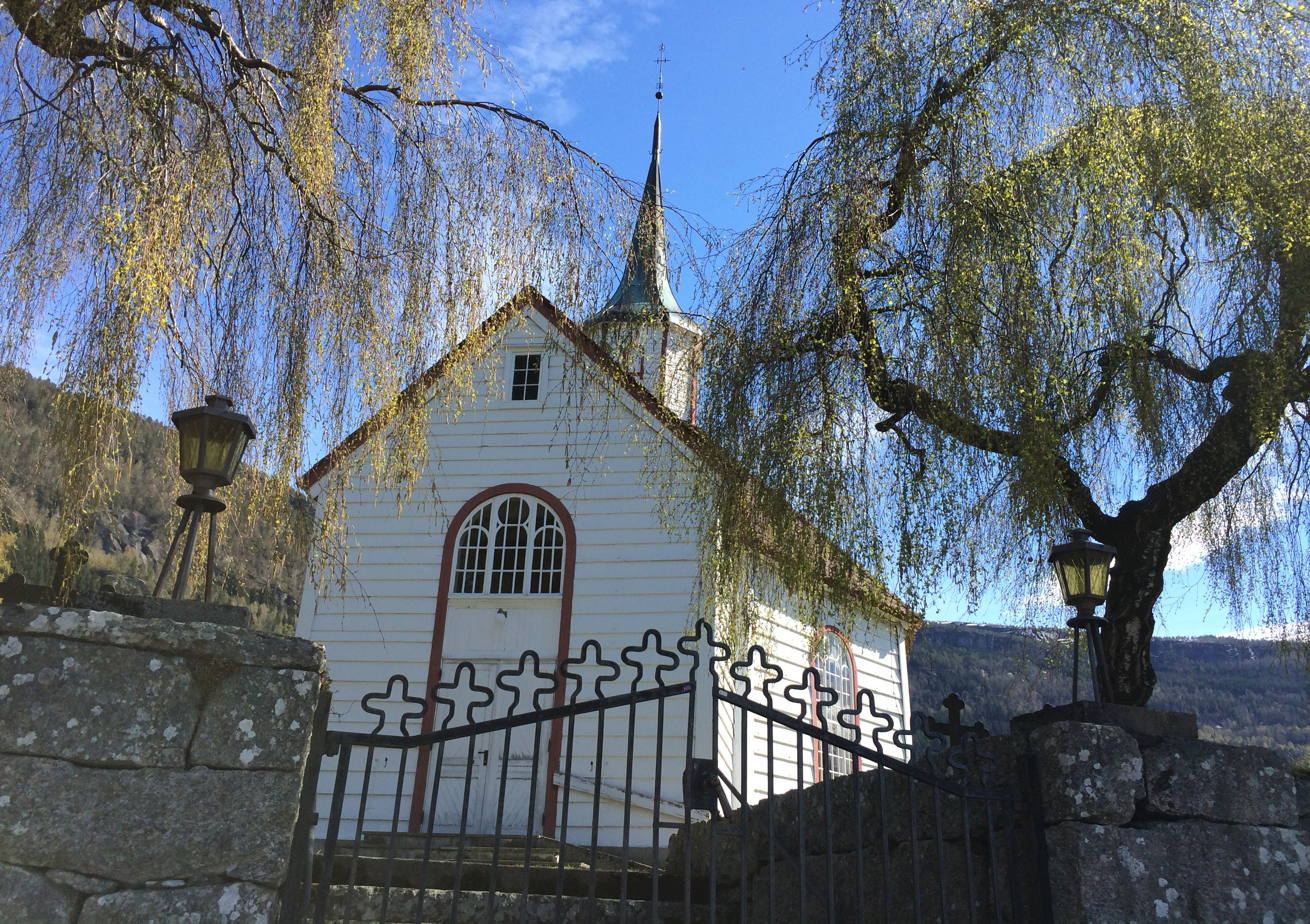

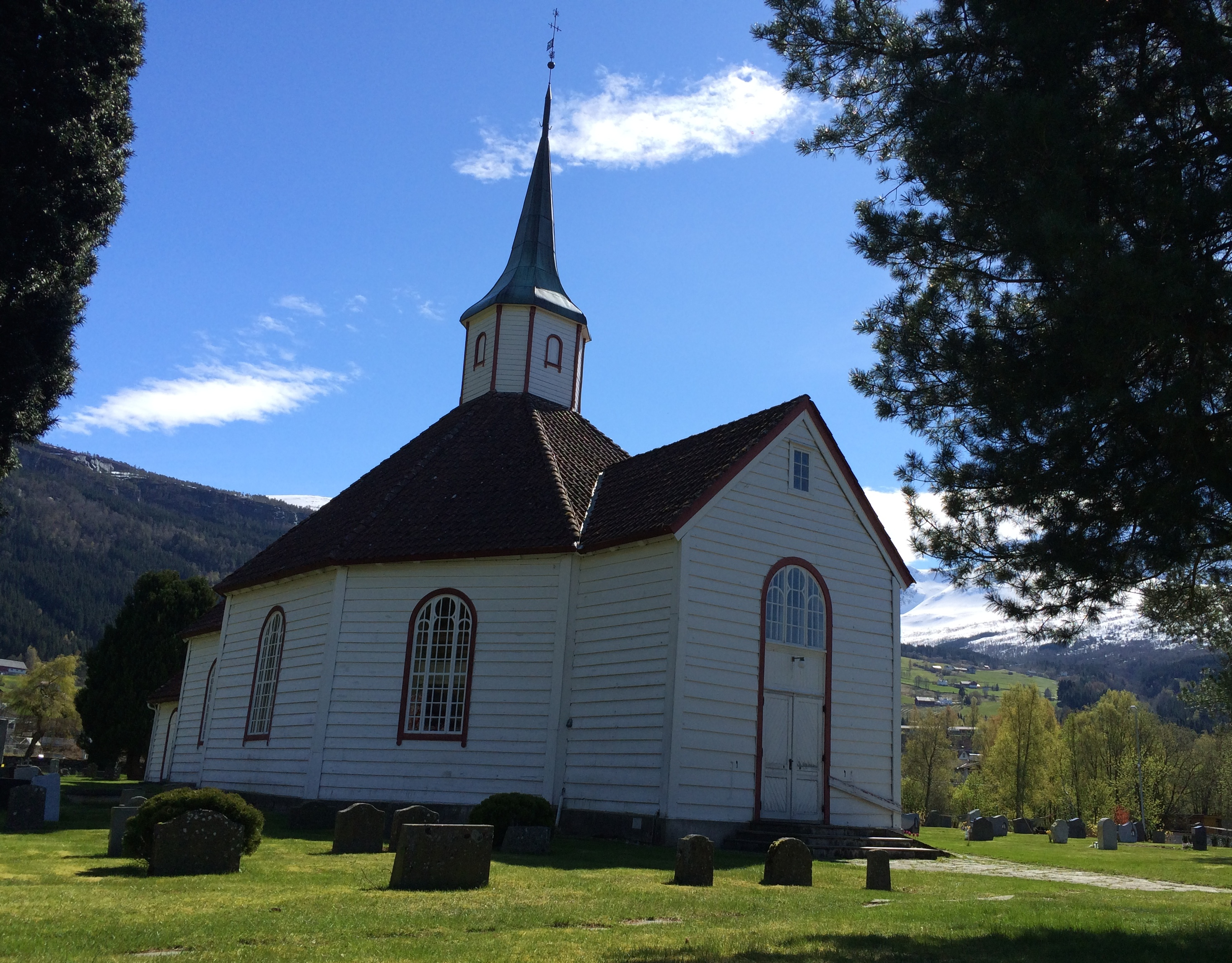

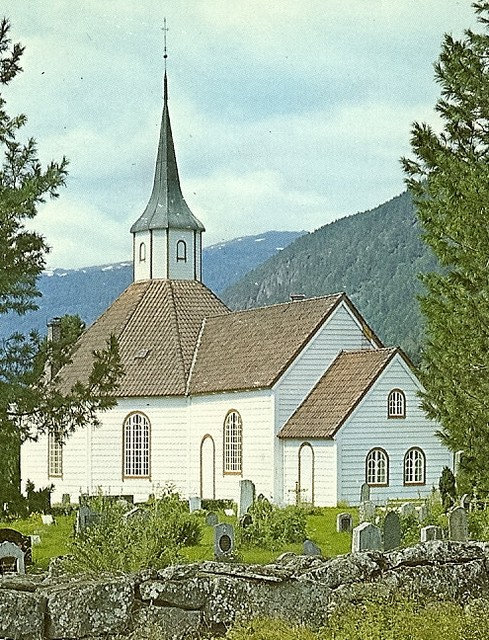

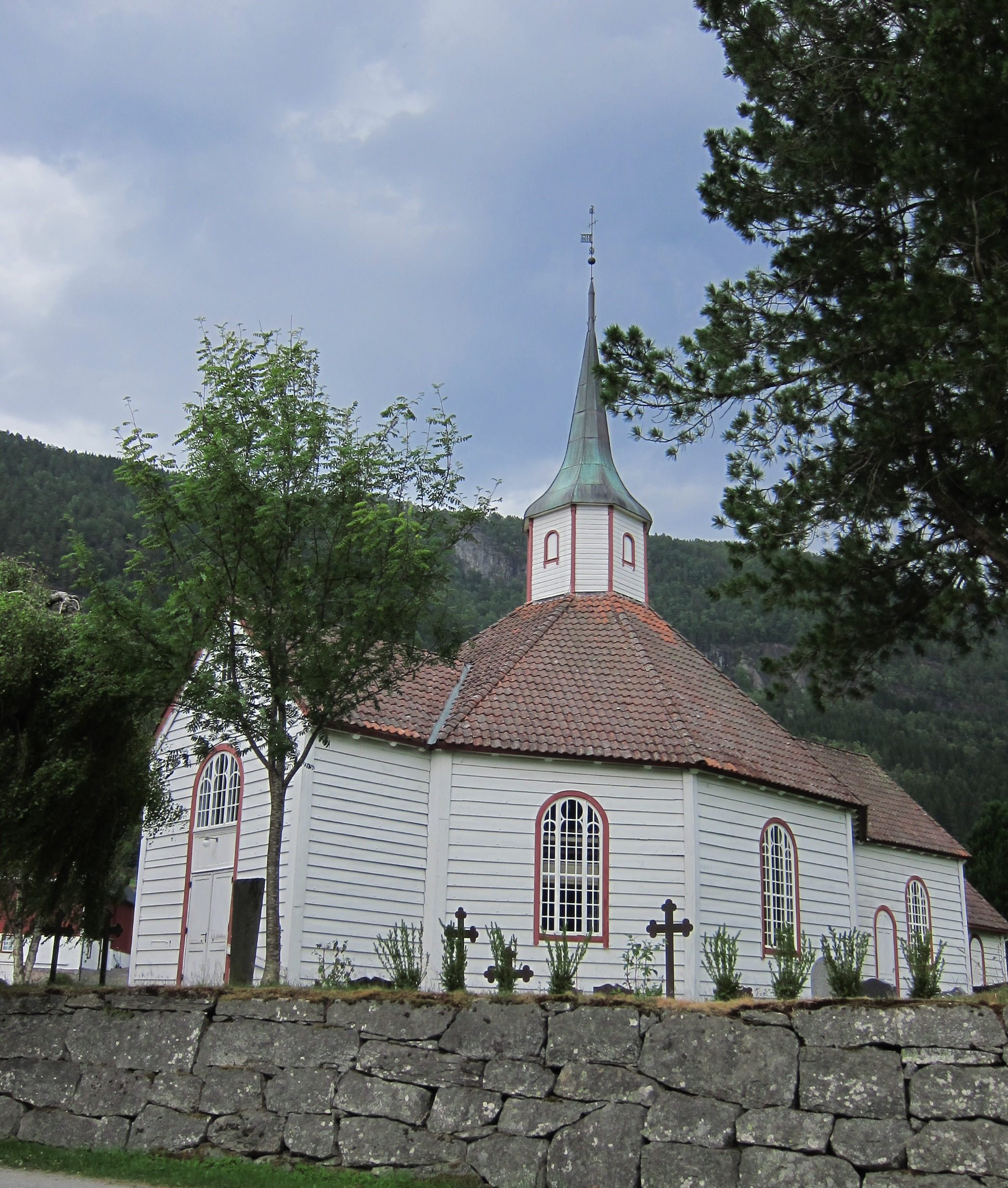

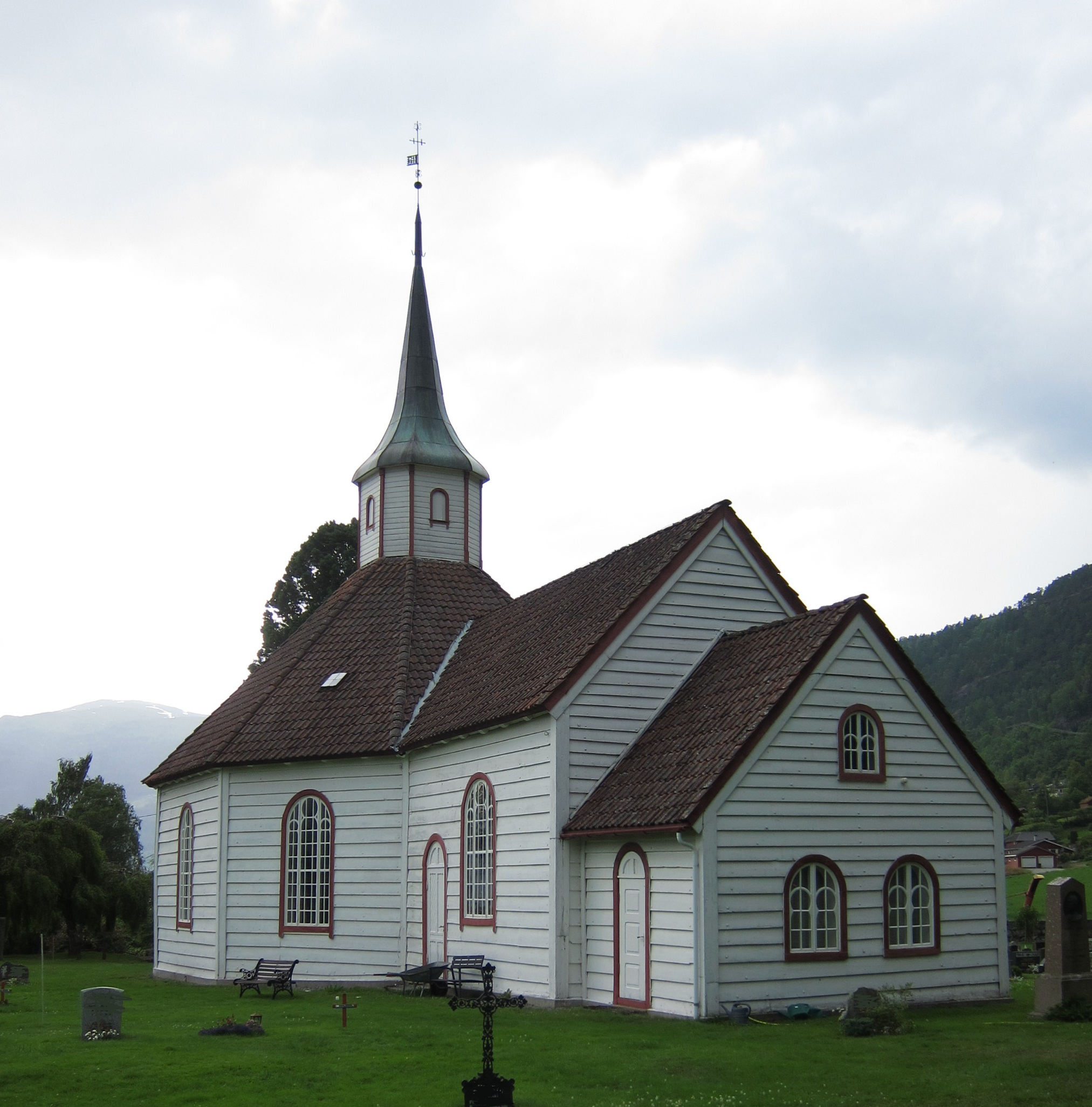
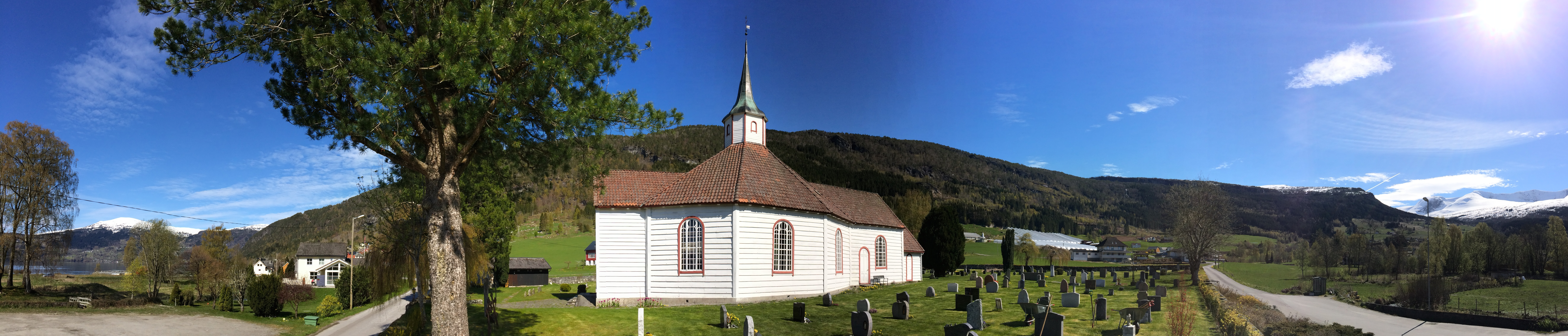

== See also ==
- List of churches in Bjørgvin
