= Nedstryn =

Village in Stryn Municipality, Norway

- Village
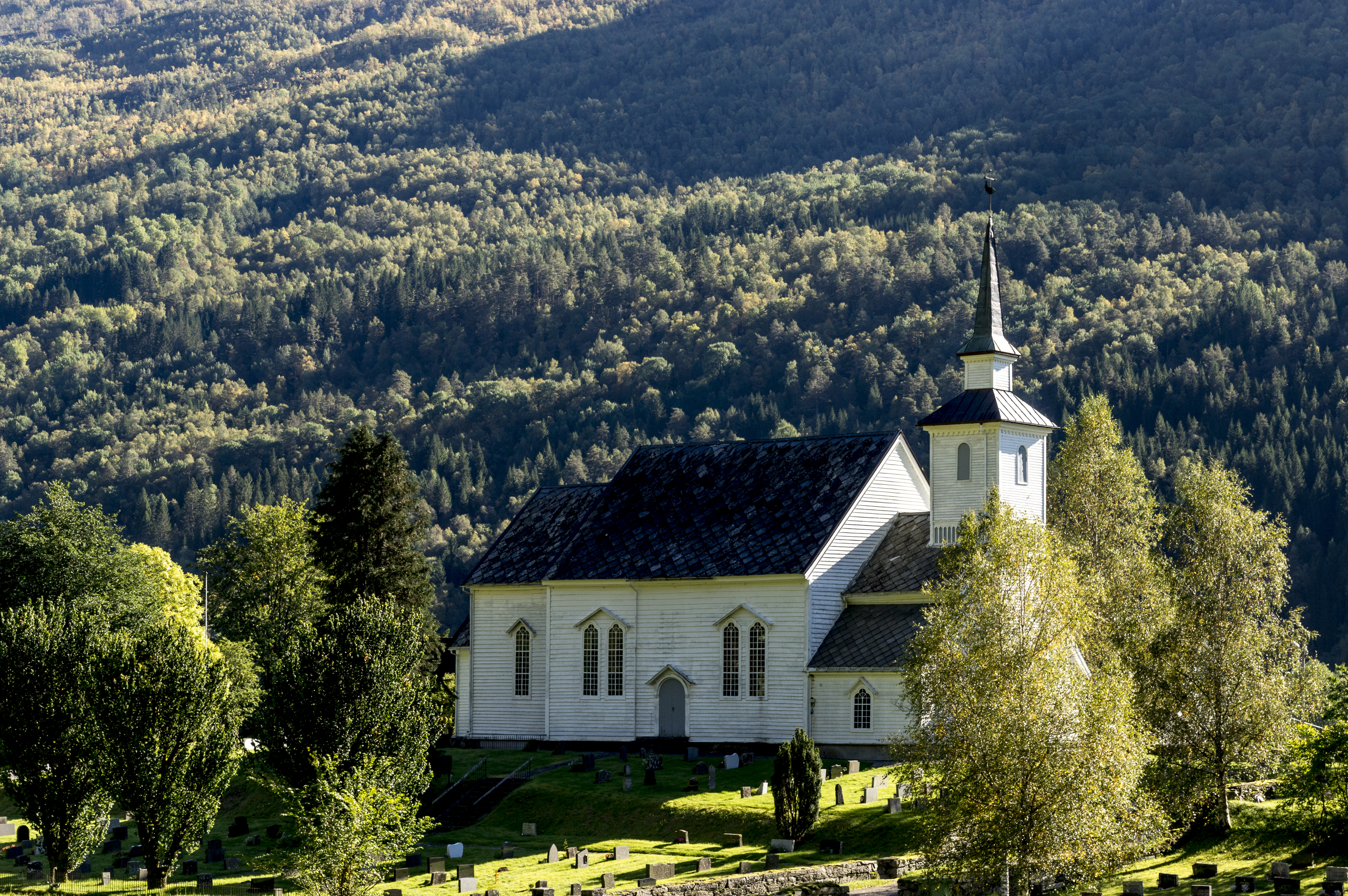
- View of the local church
- Interactive map of Nedstryn
- Location within Vestland Location within Norway
- Coordinates: 61.9189°N 6.7834°E
- Country: Norway
- Region: Western Norway
- County: Vestland
- District: Nordfjord
- Municipality: Stryn Municipality
- Elevation: 183 m (600 ft)
- Time zone: UTC+01:00 (CET)
  - Summer (DST): UTC+02:00 (CEST)
- Post Code: 6783 Stryn

Nedstryn is a small village in Stryn Municipality in Vestland county, Norway. The village is located along the river Stryneelva, about 3.5 kilometres (2.2 mi) east of the village of Stryn and the same distance west of the large lake Oppstrynsvatnet. The small village is home to Nedstryn Church. The church serves all of the residents in the area surrounding the church, including the nearby village of Stryn and the areas north of the lake Oppstrynsvatnet including the village of Flo.
