= Jostedalsbreen National Park Center =

- Jostedalsbreen nasjonalparksenter
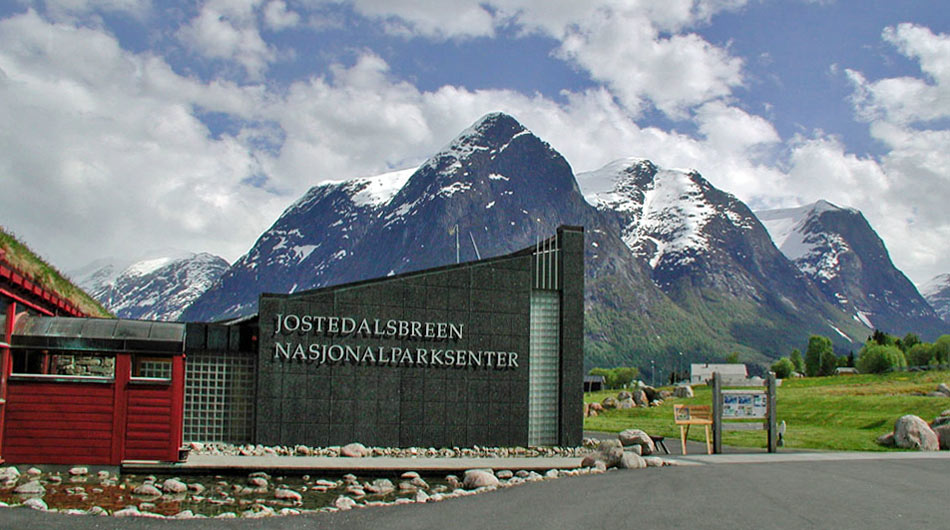
- Jostedalsbreen nasjonalparksenter
- Established: 1992
- Location: Oppstryn, Norway
- Coordinates: 61.9111°N 7.0494°E
- Type: Park Visitor Center
- Website: https://visitjostedalsbreen.no/en/

Jostedalsbreen National Park Center (Norwegian: Jostedalsbreen nasjonalparksenter) is a visitor center in the village of Oppstryn in Stryn Municipality in Vestland county, Norway. The center is east of the villages of Loen and Olden, on the shore of the lake Oppstrynsvatnet. The mountain Skåla and the glaciers Briksdalsbreen and Jostedalsbreen are to the southwest of this visitor center.

Jostedalsbreen National Park Center is one of the three visitor centers in Jostedalsbreen National Park, along with the Norwegian Glacier Museum and the Breheim Center. The center is owned by an independent foundation, in association with local government, Western Norway University of Applied Sciences, and several specialist groups. The Prime Minister Gro Harlem Brundtland officiated at the formal opening of the center on 19 June 1993, although it was opened to the public in 1992.

The main building at the center was constructed in a manner similar to Viking long houses where pillars rather than the walls are supporting the roof. The Viking longhouse here is the size of the biggest actual longhouse found in Norway. There is also a cinema building which is used to show a panorama film of the glaciers in the park. The center also has a botanical garden and geological park with native plants and rocks. The main building houses exhibits about the area's culture, animal life, and history. There is also information about avalanches.
