= Oppstryn =

Village in Stryn Municipality, Norway

Oppstryn Fosnes
- Village
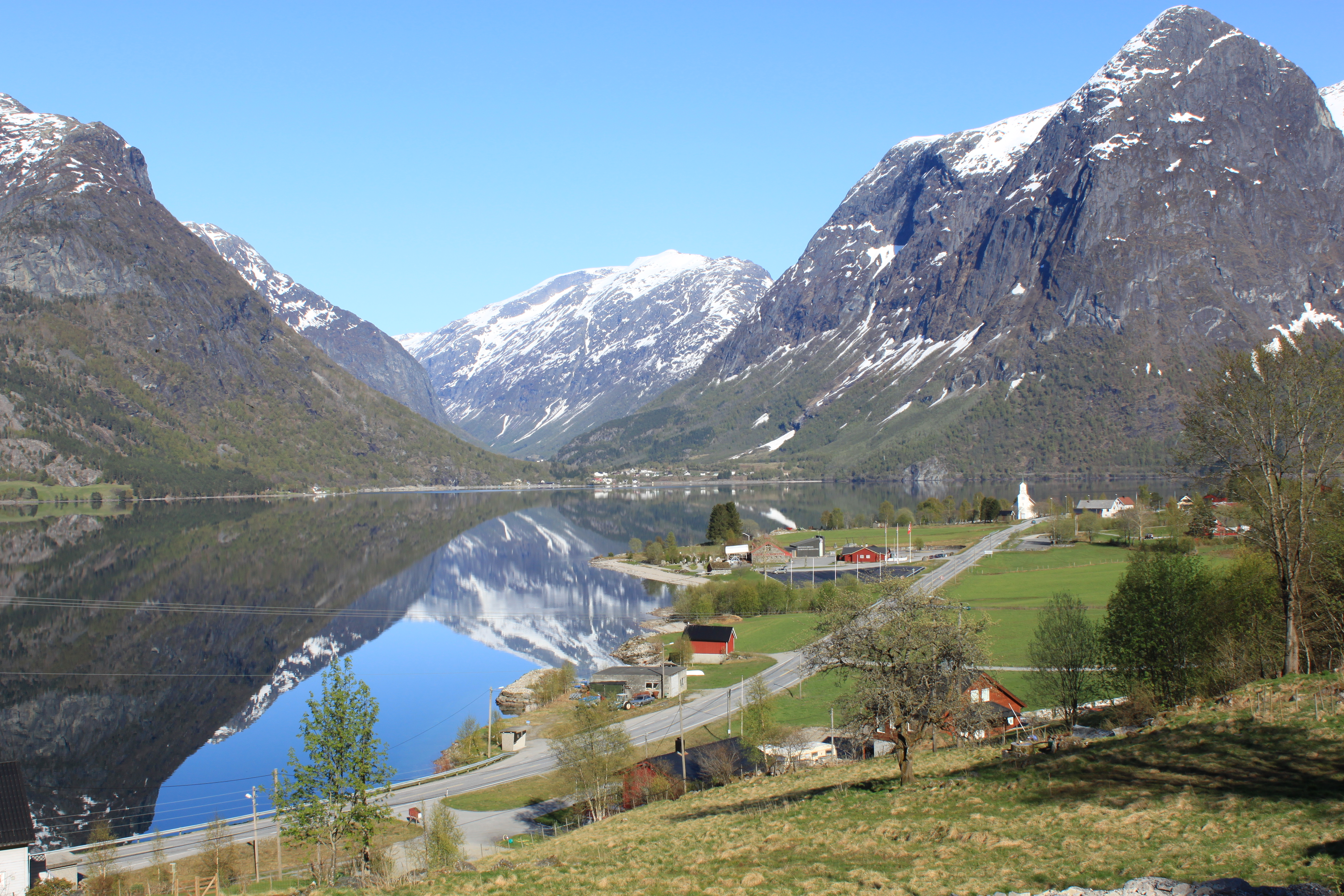
- View of the village
- Interactive map of Oppstryn; Fosnes
- Location within Vestland Location within Norway
- Coordinates: 61.9106°N 7.0549°E
- Country: Norway
- Region: Western Norway
- County: Vestland
- District: Nordfjord
- Municipality: Stryn Municipality
- Elevation: 55 m (180 ft)
- Time zone: UTC+01:00 (CET)
  - Summer (DST): UTC+02:00 (CEST)
- Post Code: 6799 Oppstryn

Oppstryn or Fosnes is a village in Stryn Municipality in Vestland county, Norway. The village is located on the southern shore of the large lake Oppstrynsvatnet. It is located about 15 kilometres (9.3 mi) from the village of Ospeli and about 4 kilometres (2.5 mi) south of the village of Flo (across the lake). Norwegian National Road 15 runs through the village on its way to the village of Stryn. Oppstryn Church is located in this village.

The mountain Skåla lies just southwest of the village, inside Jostedalsbreen National Park.
