= Tindefjellsbreen =

Glacier in Vestland, Norway

- Tindefjellbreen (unofficial)
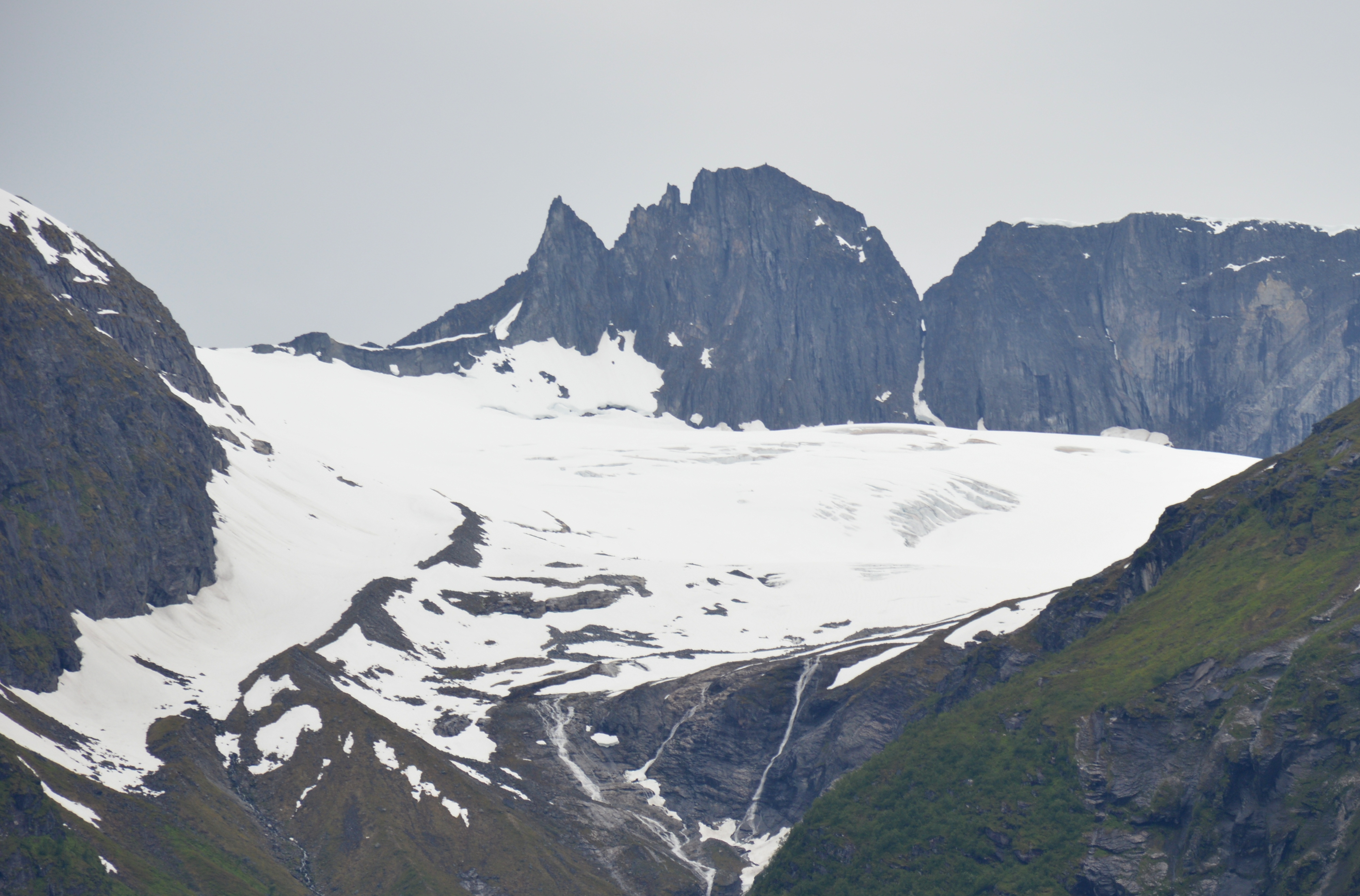
- View of the glacier
- Interactive map of the glacier
- Location: Vestland, Norway
- Coordinates: 61.83772°N 7.09522°E
- Area: 20 km^{2} (7.7 sq mi)

Tindefjellsbreen is a glacier in Stryn Municipality in Vestland county, Norway. The 20-square-kilometre (7.7 sq mi) glacier lies about 4 kilometres (2.5 mi) east of the mountain Skåla, roughly halfway between the villages of Bødalen and Erdalen. The glacier is in the mountains east of the lake Lovatnet and south of the lake Oppstrynsvatn. The glacier is part of Jostedalsbreen National Park, about 10 kilometres (6.2 mi) east of the village of Loen.

== See also ==
- List of glaciers in Norway
