= Nedstryn Church =

Church in Vestland, Norway

- Nedstryn kyrkje
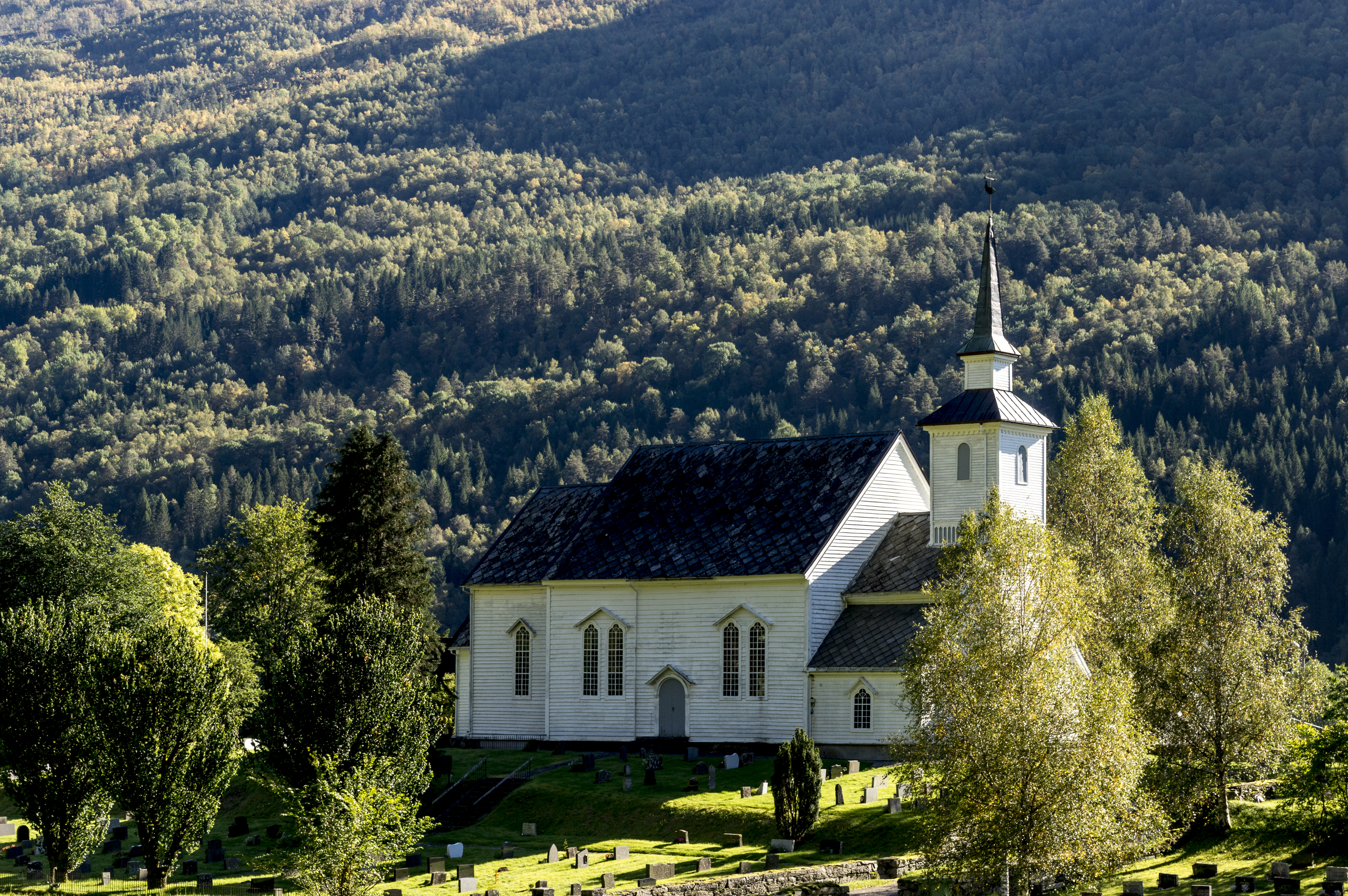
- View of the church
- Nedstryn Church
- 61°55′07″N 6°47′01″E
- Location: Stryn Municipality, Vestland
- Country: Norway
- Denomination: Church of Norway
- Churchmanship: Evangelical Lutheran

History
- Status: Parish church
- Founded: 13th century
- Consecrated: 6 Nov 1859

Architecture
- Functional status: Active
- Architect(s): Ludolph Rolfsen and Hans Linstow
- Architectural type: Long church
- Completed: 1859 (167 years ago)

Specifications
- Capacity: 400
- Materials: Wood

Administration
- Diocese: Bjørgvin bispedømme
- Deanery: Nordfjord prosti
- Parish: Nedstryn
- Norwegian Cultural Heritage Site
- Type: Church
- Status: Listed
- ID: 85099

Nedstryn Church (Norwegian: Nedstryn kyrkje) is a parish church of the Church of Norway in Stryn Municipality in Vestland county, Norway. It is located in the village of Nedstryn, just west of the municipal centre of Stryn. It is the church for the Nedstryn parish which is part of the Nordfjord prosti (deanery) in the Diocese of Bjørgvin. The white, wooden church was built in a long church design in 1859 by Ludolph Rolfsen using plans drawn up by the architect Hans Linstow. The church seats about 400 people.

== History ==
The earliest existing historical records of the church date back to the year 1330, but it was not new at that time. The first church was likely a wooden stave church that was probably built during the 13th century. For hundreds of years, the church was known as Stryn Church (it was later renamed Nedstryn Church). Archaeologists have found items dating back to the Stone Age on this historic church site.

The medieval stave church was demolished around 1650 and a new log cruciform church was built on the site. This church was tarred on the outside and had a tower over the church porch on the west end. By the mid-1800s the ailing old church building was in need of major repairs or replacement, so in 1855, it was decided to tear down the church and build a new one on the same site. The parish hired Christian Heinrich Grosch to draw plans for a wooden octagonal church. Next, the parish searched for a builder to construct the new church, but the only builder they could find was Gjert Lien from Nordfjordeid. Lien said he was unable to build the church based on these designs since it was a more "modern" octagonal design and he had only built more traditional designs. Since no other builder could be found, the parish had to change the plans. The parish then got drawings by Captain Ludolph Rolfsen for the construction of Herøy Church. Rolfsen's drawings slightly modified drawings of a church that had been designed by Hans Linstow. The new church would be a wooden long church with a rectangular nave and a church porch with a tower on the west end and a chancel and sacristy on the east end. So after much planning, in 1859, the old church was demolished and a new building was constructed on the same site. The new church was consecrated on 6 November 1859 by Rev. Wilhelm Frimann Koren.

In 1904, a wood stove was installed in the church to provide heat. In 1920, electric lighting was installed in the church. During a major renovation in 1934, the church interior was completely redone with new colors of paint. Also, the "new" altarpiece from 1919 was replaced with the old one from 1610 which had been found in the church attic. In 1959, the old wood stove was removed and electric heating was installed in the church. In 1963, bathroom facilities were added in the basement. In 1965, the church porch was enlarged on the north and south to add extra space for meeting and storage.

== Media gallery ==
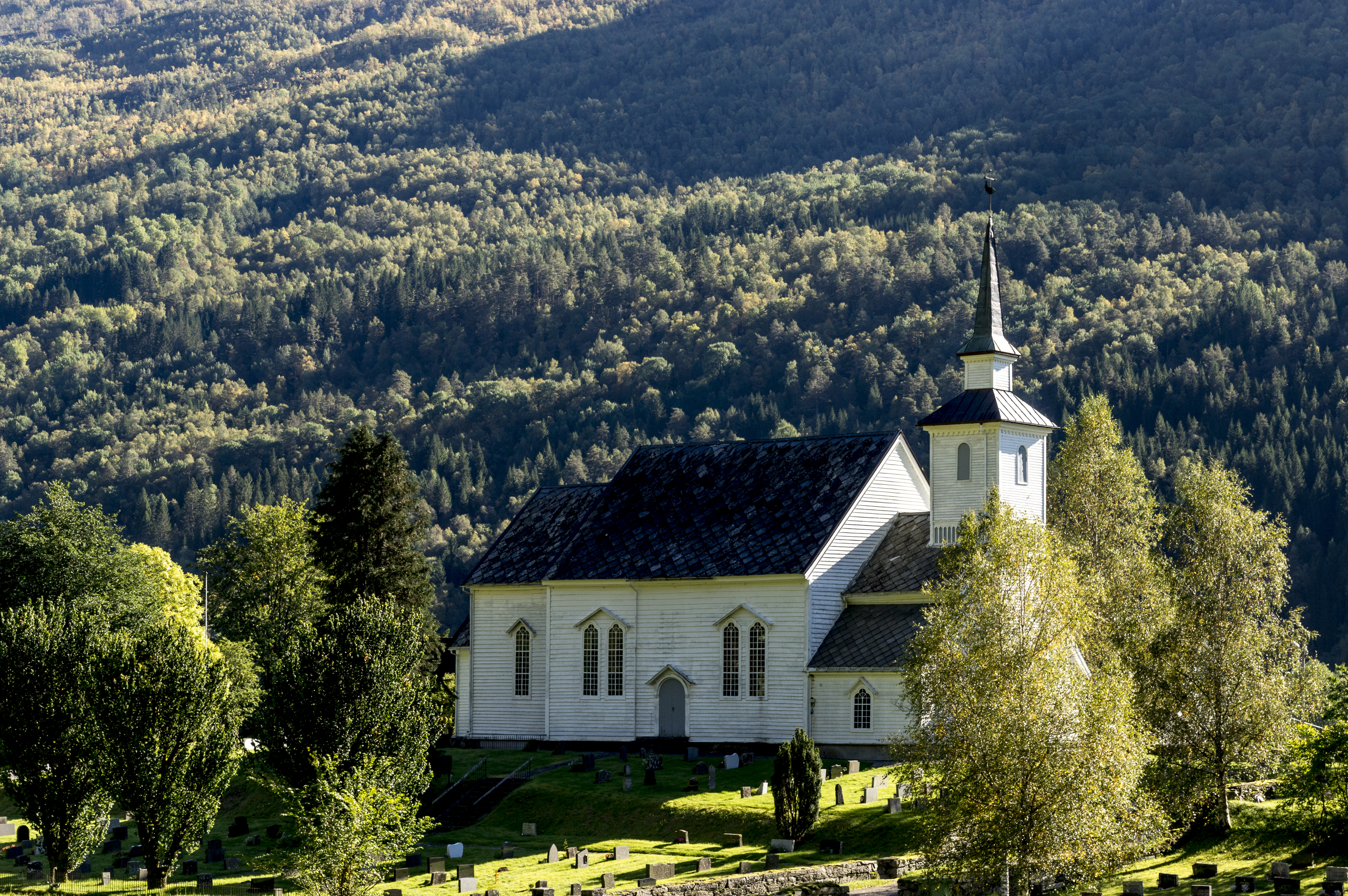
Exterior view (2012)

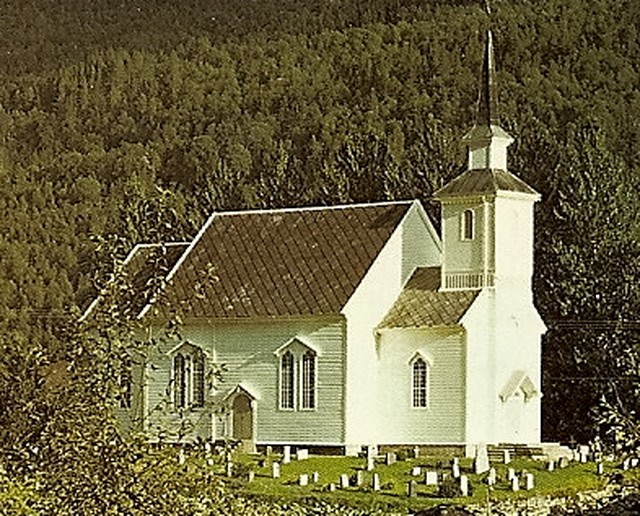
Exterior view

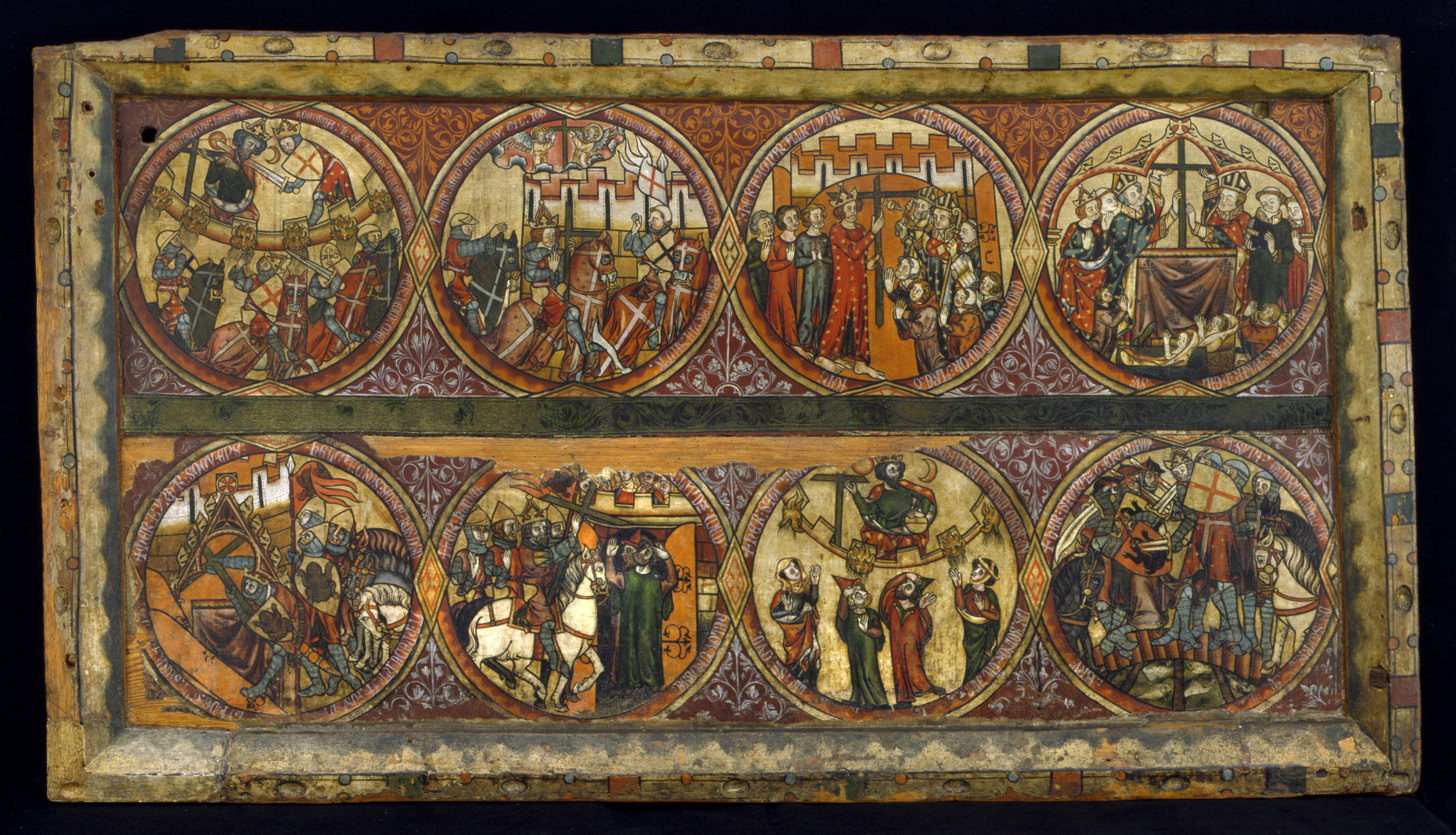
Altar artwork in the church

== See also ==
- List of churches in Bjørgvin
