= Lovatnet =

Lake in Stryn, Norway

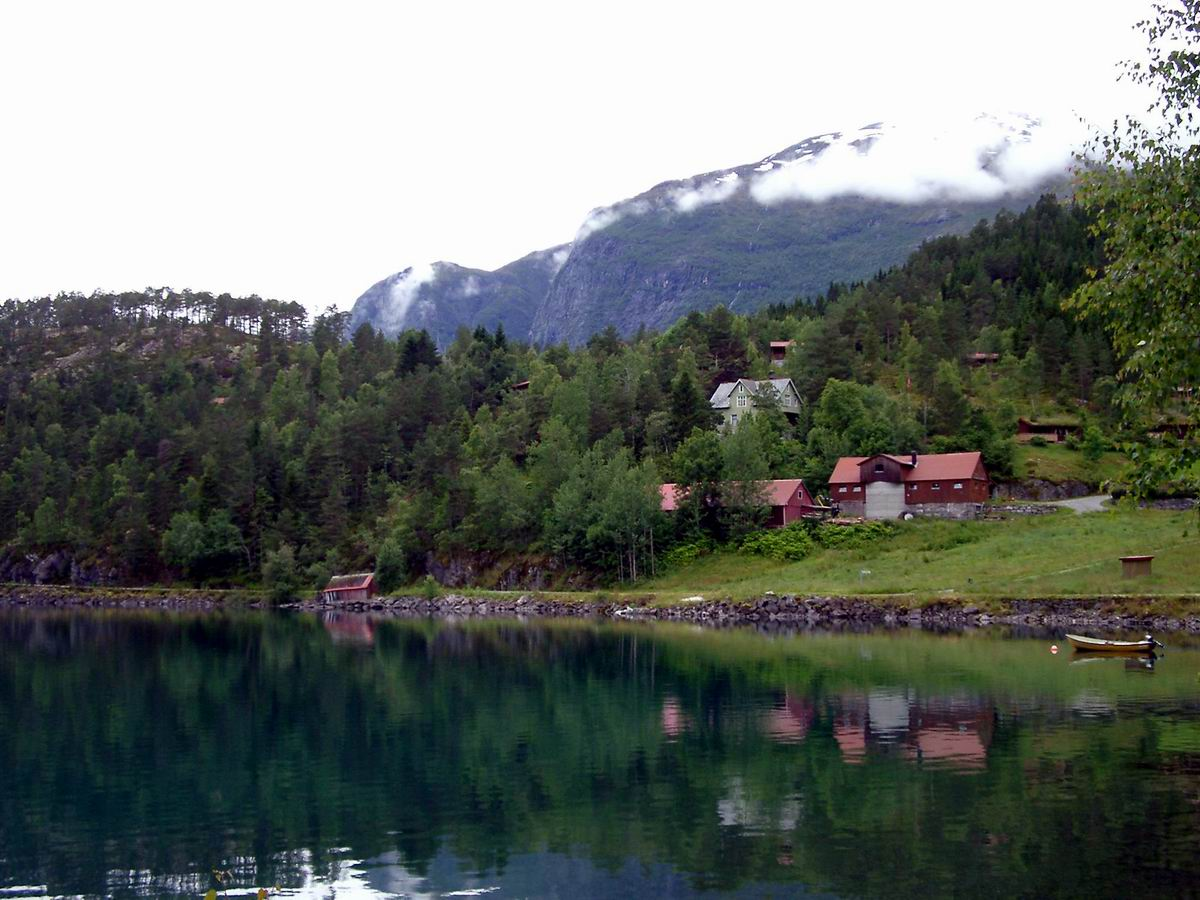
- Interactive map of the lake
- Location: Stryn Municipality,Vestland
- Coordinates: 61.8423°N 6.9327°E
- Primary inflows: Kjenndalselva river
- Primary outflows: Loelva river
- Basin countries: Norway
- Max. length: 11 kilometres (6.8 mi)
- Max. width: 1.5 kilometres (0.93 mi)
- Surface area: 10.49 km^{2} (4.05 sq mi)
- Shore length^{1}: 26.98 kilometres (16.76 mi)
- Surface elevation: 52 metres (171 ft)
- References: NVE
- ^{1} Shore length is not a well-defined measure.

Lovatnet (also: Loenvatnet) is a lake in Stryn Municipality in Vestland county, Norway. It is located about 2 kilometres (1.2 mi) southeast of the village of Loen and about 6 kilometres (3.7 mi) east of the village of Olden. The lake lies just 2 kilometres (1.2 mi) southwest of the mountain Skåla. The water from the lake flows down from the mountains; especially from the Jostedalsbreen and Tindefjellbreen glaciers. It then flows out through the Loelva river into the Nordfjorden.

Water from the tiered horsetail waterfall Ramnefjellsfossen with a total height of 818 metres (2,684 ft) flows into the lake from a short distance away, by some criteria among the highest dozen waterfalls in the world. It is fed by meltwater from the glacier Ramnefjellbreen, an arm of the Jostedalsbreen glacier.

== History ==
Landslides into the southern end of the lake from the mountain Ramnefjellet caused two major megatsunamis in 1905 and 1936. On 15 January 1905, a landslide with a volume of 350,000 cubic metres (460,000 cu yd) fell into the lake from a height of 500 metres (1,640 ft), generating three megatsunamis of up to 40.5 metres (133 ft) in height. The waves destroyed the villages of Bødal and Nesdal near the southern end of the lake, killing 61 people — half their combined population — and 261 farm animals and destroying 60 houses, all the local boathouses, and 70 to 80 boats, one of which — the tourist boat Lodalen — was thrown 300 metres (328 yd) inland by the last wave and wrecked. At the northern end of the lake, a wave measured at almost 6 metres (20 ft) in height destroyed a bridge.

Geologists studied the 1905 event and concluded that little risk existed for future disasters like it, so the towns along the lake were rebuilt. However, on 13 September 1936, the second landslide occurred, with a volume of 1,000,000 cubic metres (1,300,000 cu yd) and falling from a height of 800 metres (2,625 ft), generating three megatsunamis, the largest of which reached a height of 74 metres (243 ft). The waves destroyed all farms at Bødal and most farms at Nesdal — completely washing away 16 farms — as well as 100 houses, bridges, a power station, a workshop, a sawmill, several grain mills, a restaurant, a schoolhouse, and all boats on the lake. The waves carried the wreck of the Lodalen a further 150 m (490 ft) inland. A 12.6-metre (41 ft) wave struck the northern end of the lake and caused damaging flooding in the Loelva River, the lake's northern outlet. The waves killed 74 people and severely injured 11. The 1936 disaster resulted in the depopulation of the area.

== See also ==
- List of lakes in Norway
