= Loen Skylift =

Cable car in Nordfjord municipality, Norway

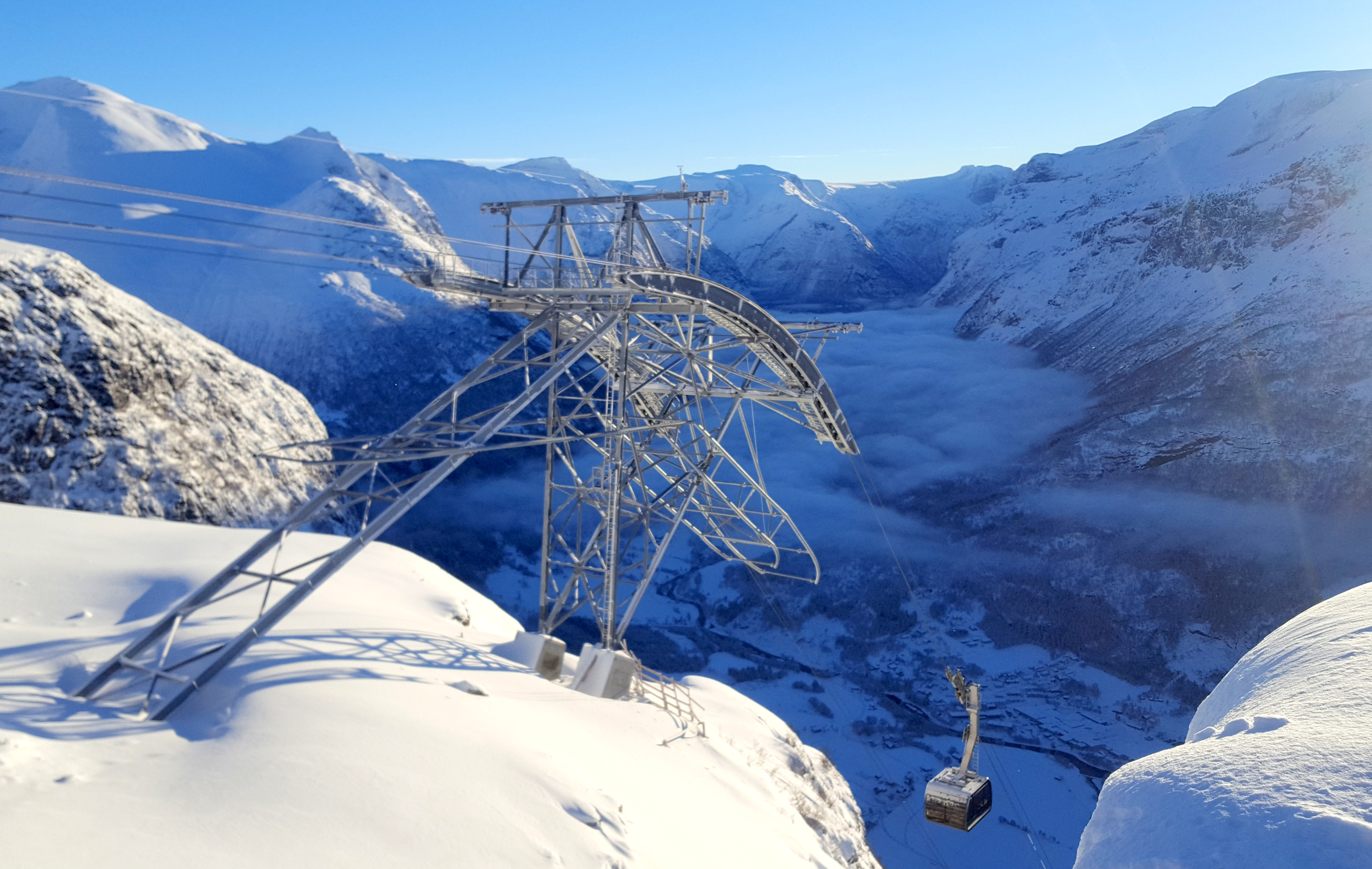

- Location within Sogn og Fjordane

Overview
- Status: Operational
- Character: Recreational
- Location: 6789 Loen; Loen, Stryn Municipality
- Country: Norway
- Coordinates: 61.874695°N 6.838774°E
- Termini: Loen; Mount Hoven
- No. of stations: 2
- Built by: Garaventa AG
- Construction begin: 2016
- Open: May 20, 2017; 9 years ago
- Website: www.loenskylift.com

Operation
- Owner: Loen Skylift AS
- Operator: Loen Skylift AS
- No. of carriers: 2
- Carrier capacity: 45
- Operating times: All year
- Trip duration: approximately 5 minutes
- Fare: 505 kr

Technical features
- Aerial lift type: Aerial tramway
- Manufactured by: Doppelmayr Garaventa Group
- Line length: 1,524.40 metres (5,001.3 ft)
- No. of support towers: 1
- Operating speed: 7 metres per second (23 ft/s)
- Vertical Interval: 1,011 metres (3,317 ft)
- Maximum Gradient: 60°

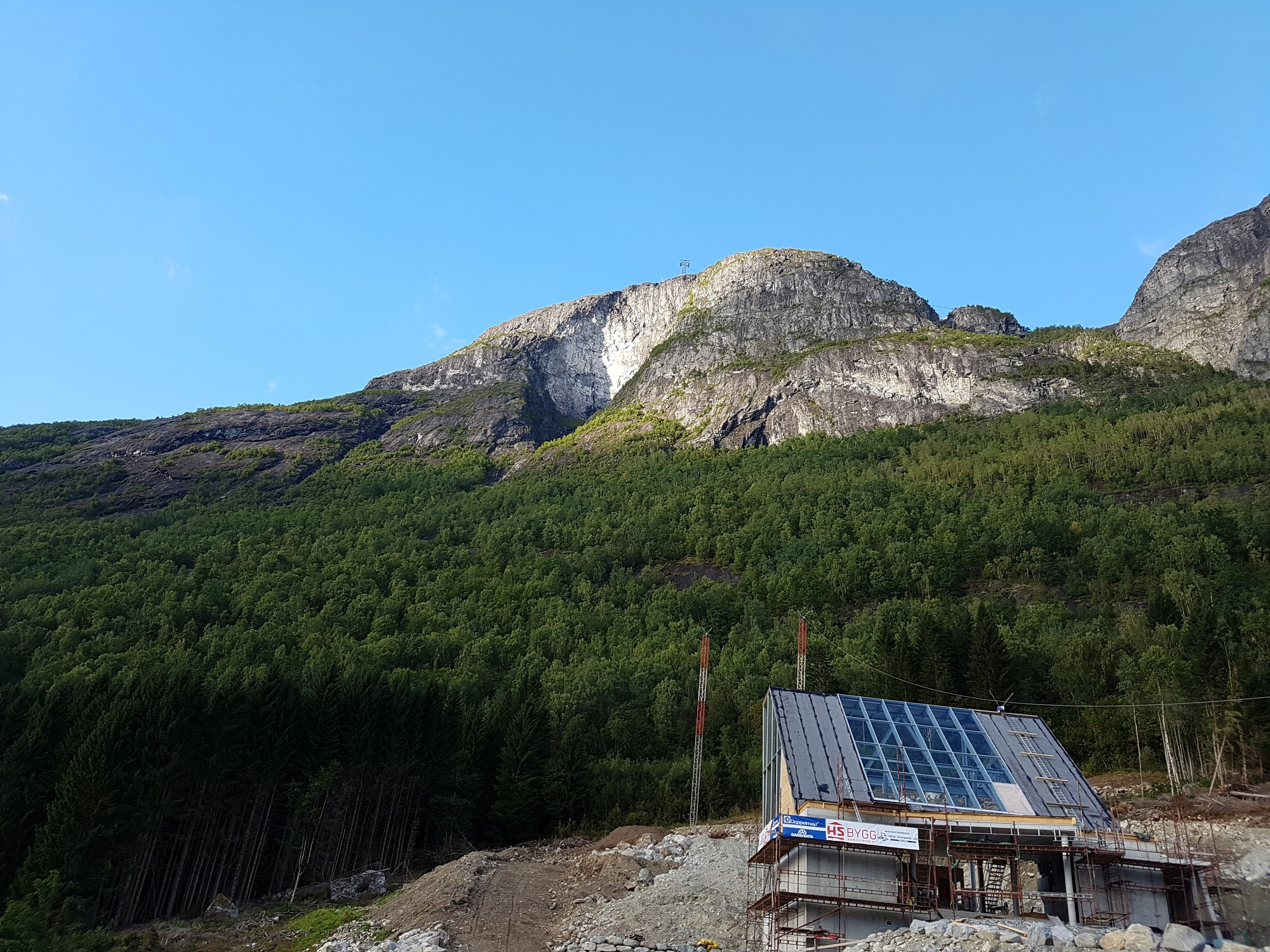
Seen from below during construction process.

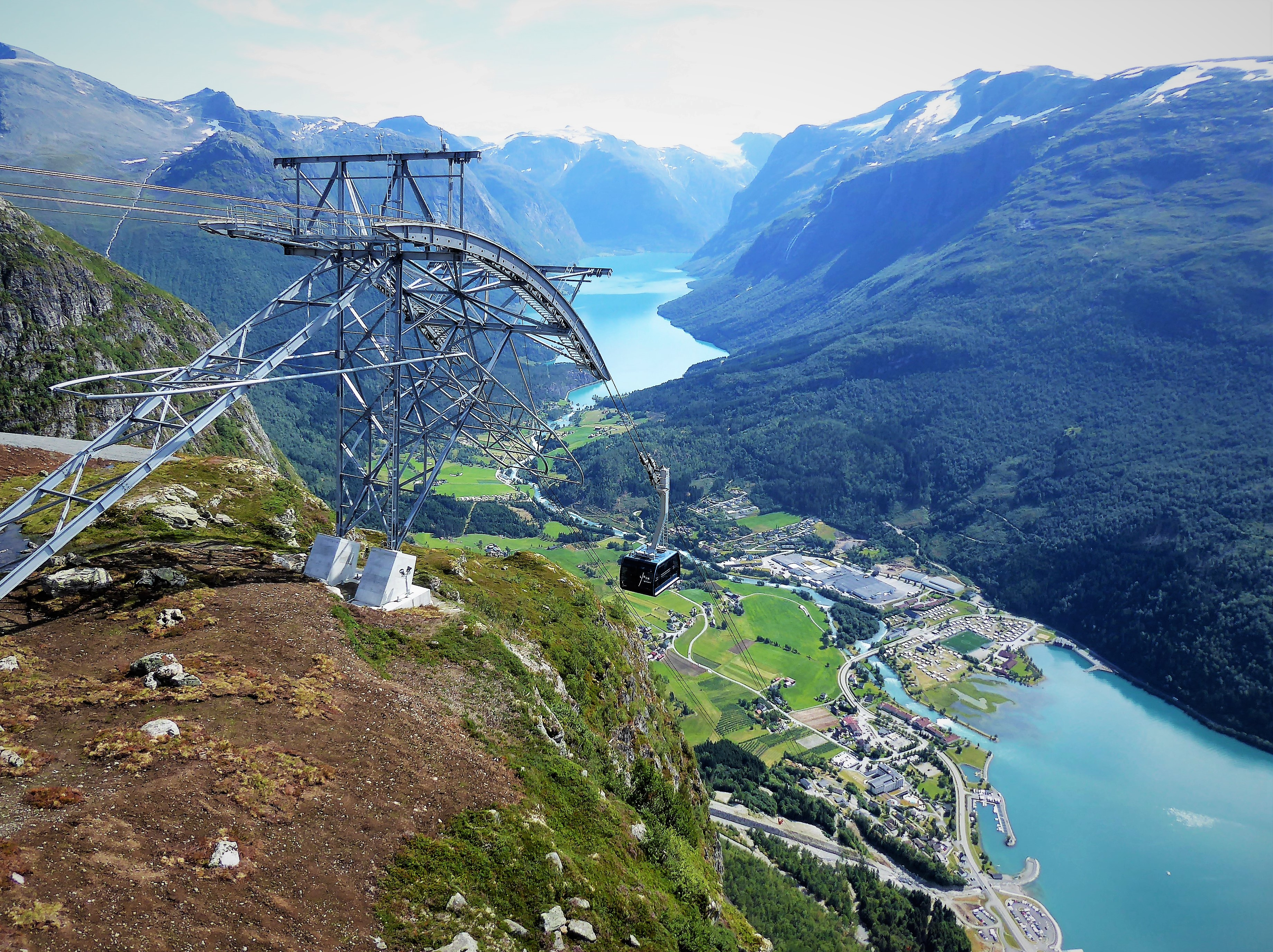
View from Hoven

Loen Skylift is an aerial tramway in the village of Loen in Stryn Municipality in Vestland county, Norway. The cable car climbs 1,011 metres (3,317 ft) to the top of Mount Hoven, above the Nordfjord. The maximum speed is 7 metres per second (16 mph). With a gradient up to 60°, it is one of the steepest in the world. The average is 45°. The gondola car is 170 metres (560 ft) above ground at the highest. It is the first aerial tramway installed in Norway since Hangursbanen in 1963.

Loen Skylift is owned and run by Loen Skylift AS, where Hotel Alexandra, Doppelmayr Garaventa Group and Stryn Municipality are the largest shareholders.

The owners expected some 55,000 visitors during 2017, while by the end of 2017 the skylift had transported 92,000 passengers. Local business in Loen village recorded an 80% increase in revenues after the skylift opened.

== History ==
The building process started in 2015, and it was inaugurated by Her Majesty Queen Sonja of Norway on 20 May 2017. The costs of the construction work total 300 million NOK.

The top station served as a venue for the debate on national TV during the 2017 campaign. It is also the location for the Hoven Restaurant and Bar. There is seating for about 370 guests divided into two sections. The restaurant is shaped like an amphitheatre, providing guests with a view of fjord landscape.
