= Loen, Norway =

Village in Stryn Municipality, Norway

Loen
- Village
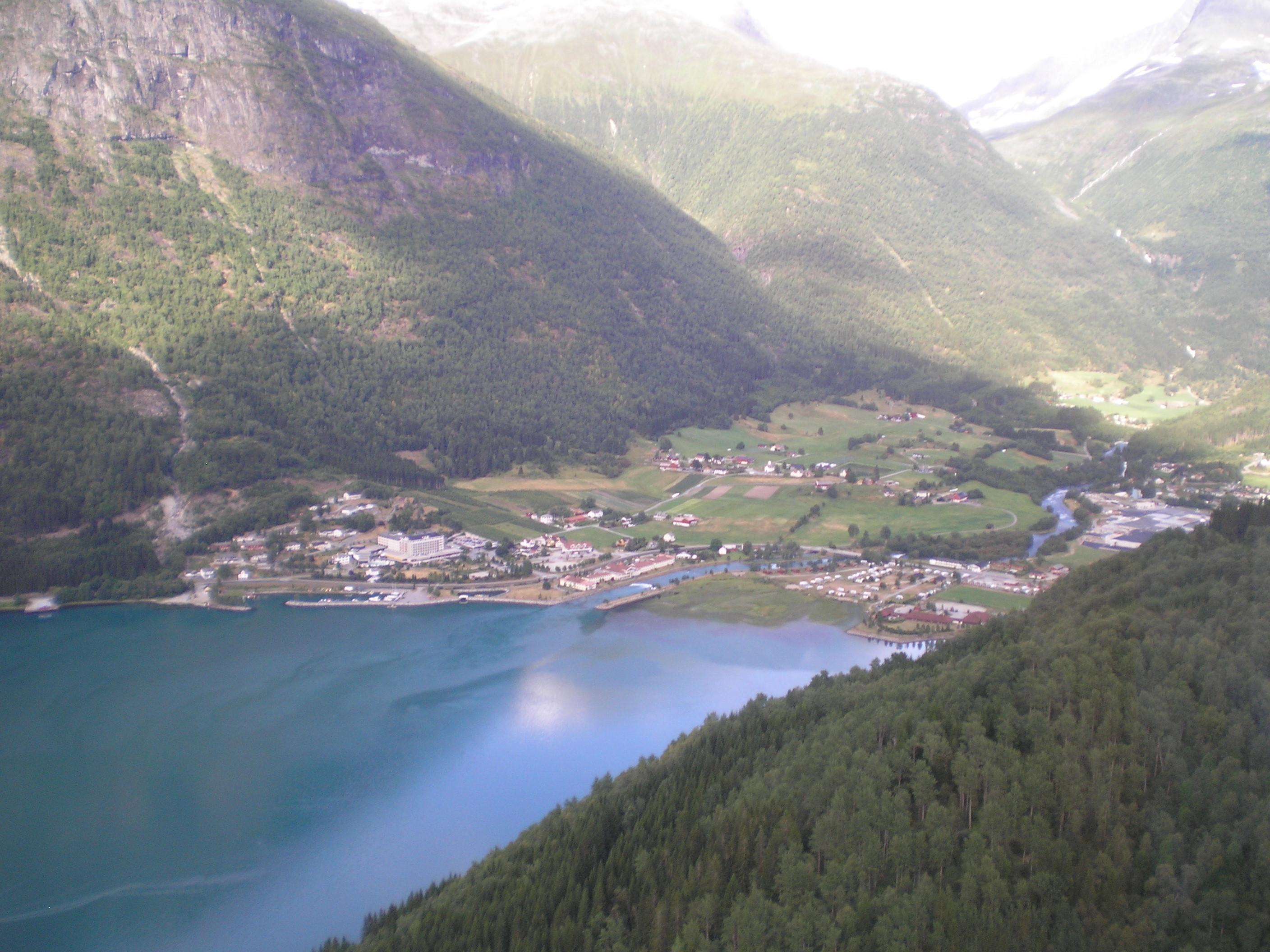
- View of Loen
- Interactive map of Loen
- Location within Vestland Location within Norway
- Coordinates: 61.8715°N 6.8459°E
- Country: Norway
- Region: Western Norway
- County: Vestland
- District: Nordfjord
- Municipality: Stryn Municipality
- Elevation: 25 m (82 ft)
- Time zone: UTC+01:00 (CET)
  - Summer (DST): UTC+02:00 (CEST)
- Post Code: 6790 Loen

Loen is a village in Stryn Municipality in Vestland county, Norway. It is located in the inner part of the Nordfjord region, at the easternmost end of the Nordfjorden. Loen is located about 6 kilometres (3.7 mi) north of the village of Olden and about 11 kilometres (6.8 mi) southeast of the municipal center of Stryn. The lake Lovatnet is located just to the southeast of the village of Loen. The Hotel Alexandra was established in Loen in 1884. The Loen Skylift was established in Loen in 2017. The historic Loen Church is also located in the village.

== History ==
Loen is the home to some of the oldest farms in Norway: Sæten (Setin), Tjugen (Tyfin), and Loen. They were probably established long before the time of Christianity. Much of the upper Loen valley was devastated from two rockfall slides (one in 1905 and one in 1936) that created huge waves that swept with them most of the houses and vegetation. A total of 135 people were killed in these two incidents.

== Attractions ==
Some nearby attractions include the Jostedalsbreen nasjonalparksenter museum, Jostedalsbreen National Park, the mountain Skåla, the Tindefjellsbreen glacier, and the Ramnefjellsfossen waterfall.

The Loen Skylift and Via Ferrata Loen is located in Loen.

== Media gallery ==
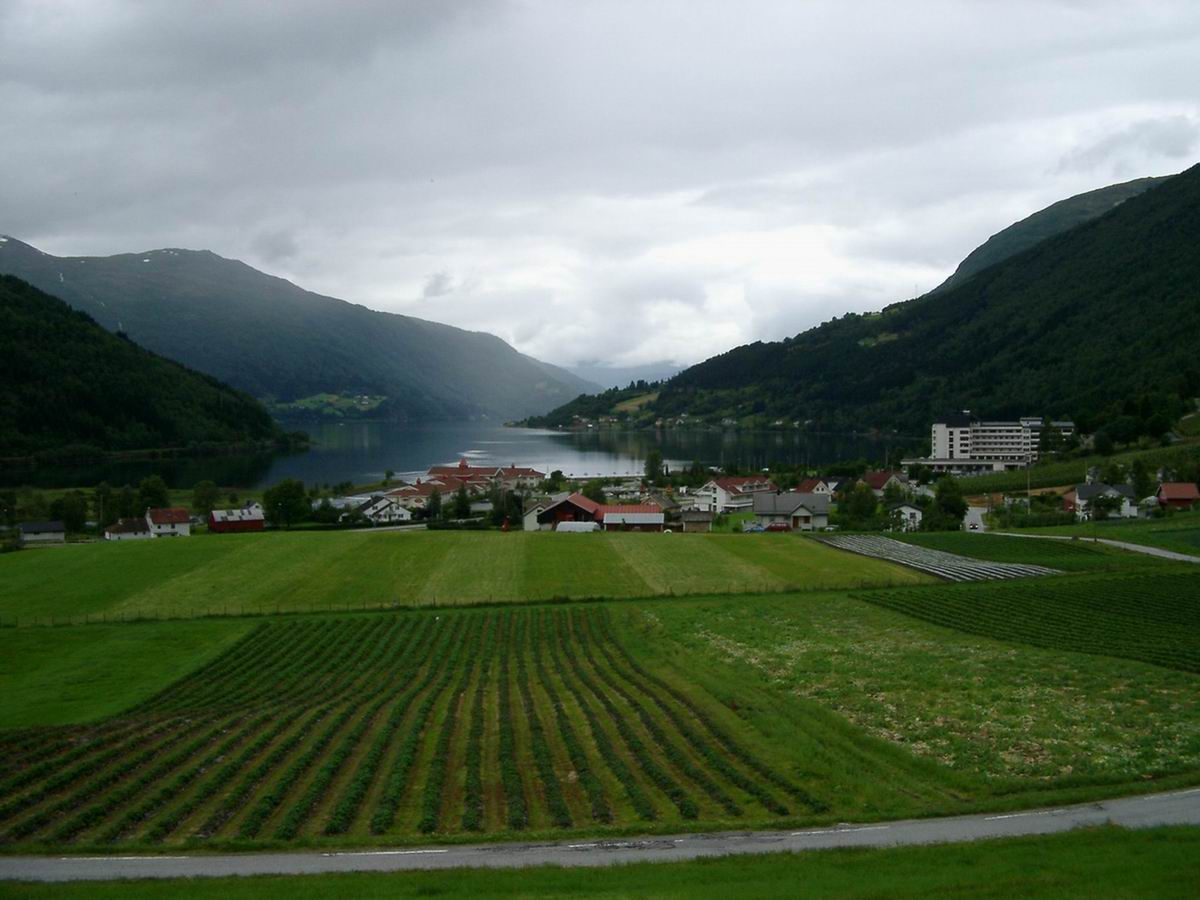
View of Loen

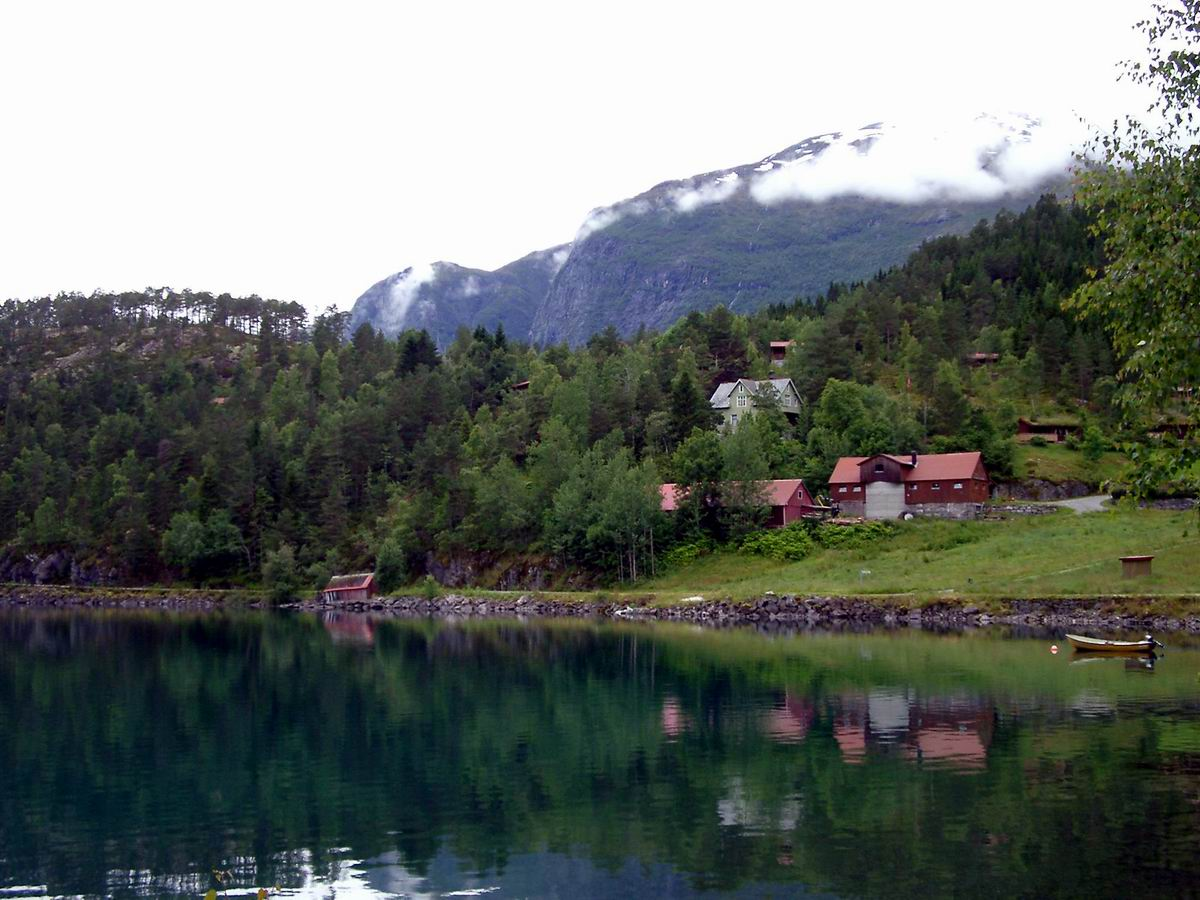
Lake Lovatnet

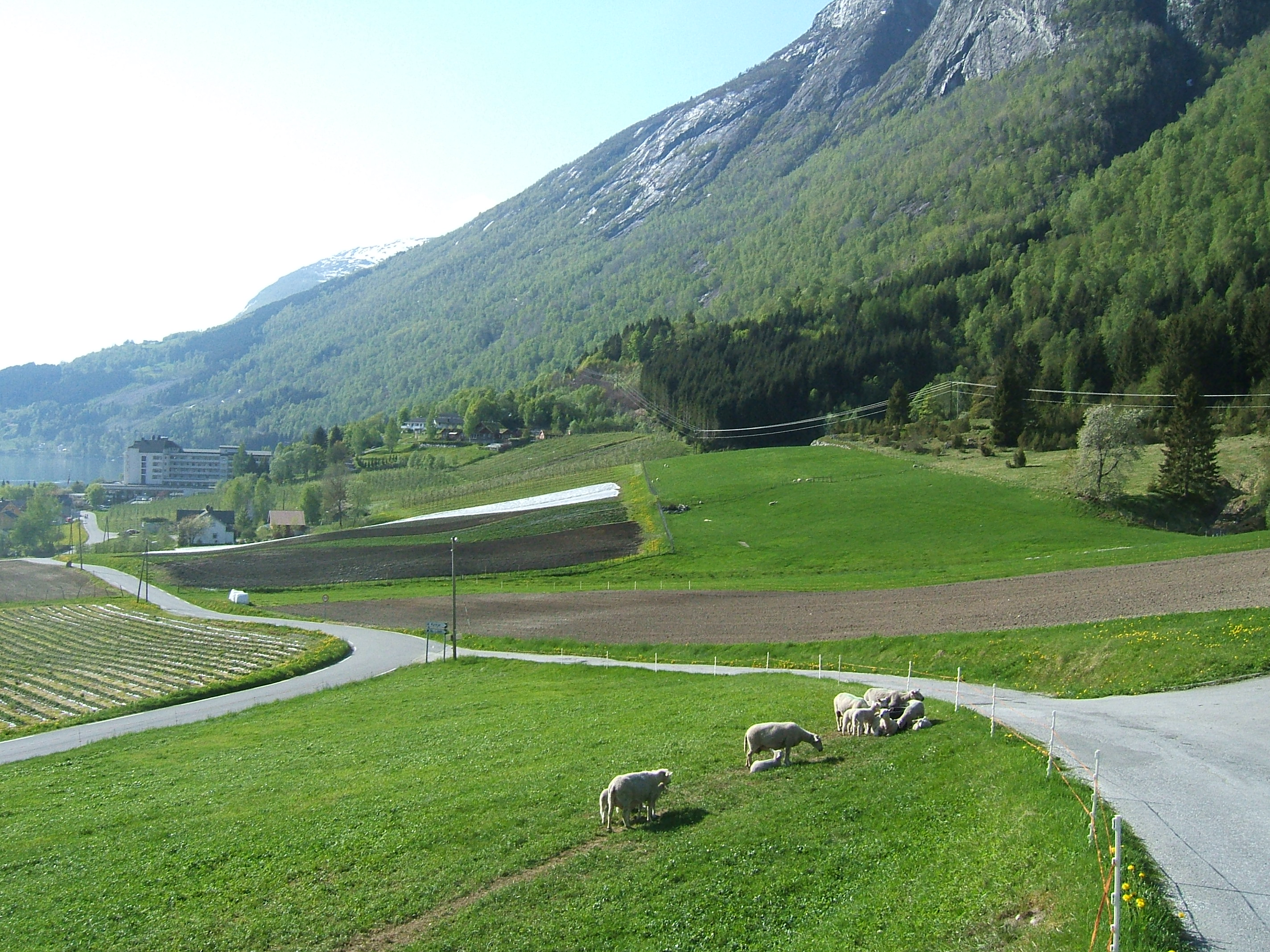
Loen with Hotel Alexandra in the distance

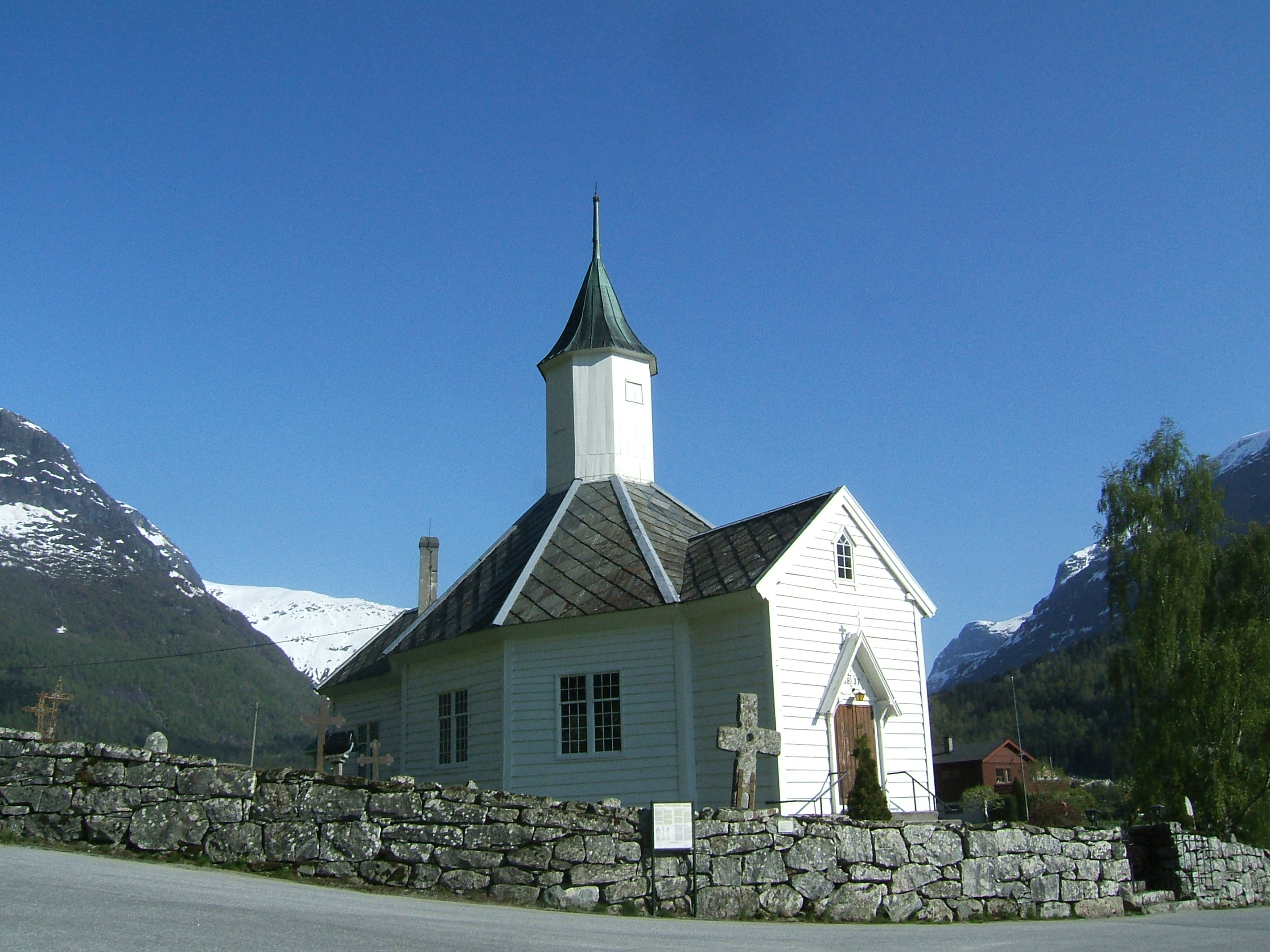
Loen Church
