= Ramnefjellsfossen =

Ramnefjellsfossen Utigardsfossen
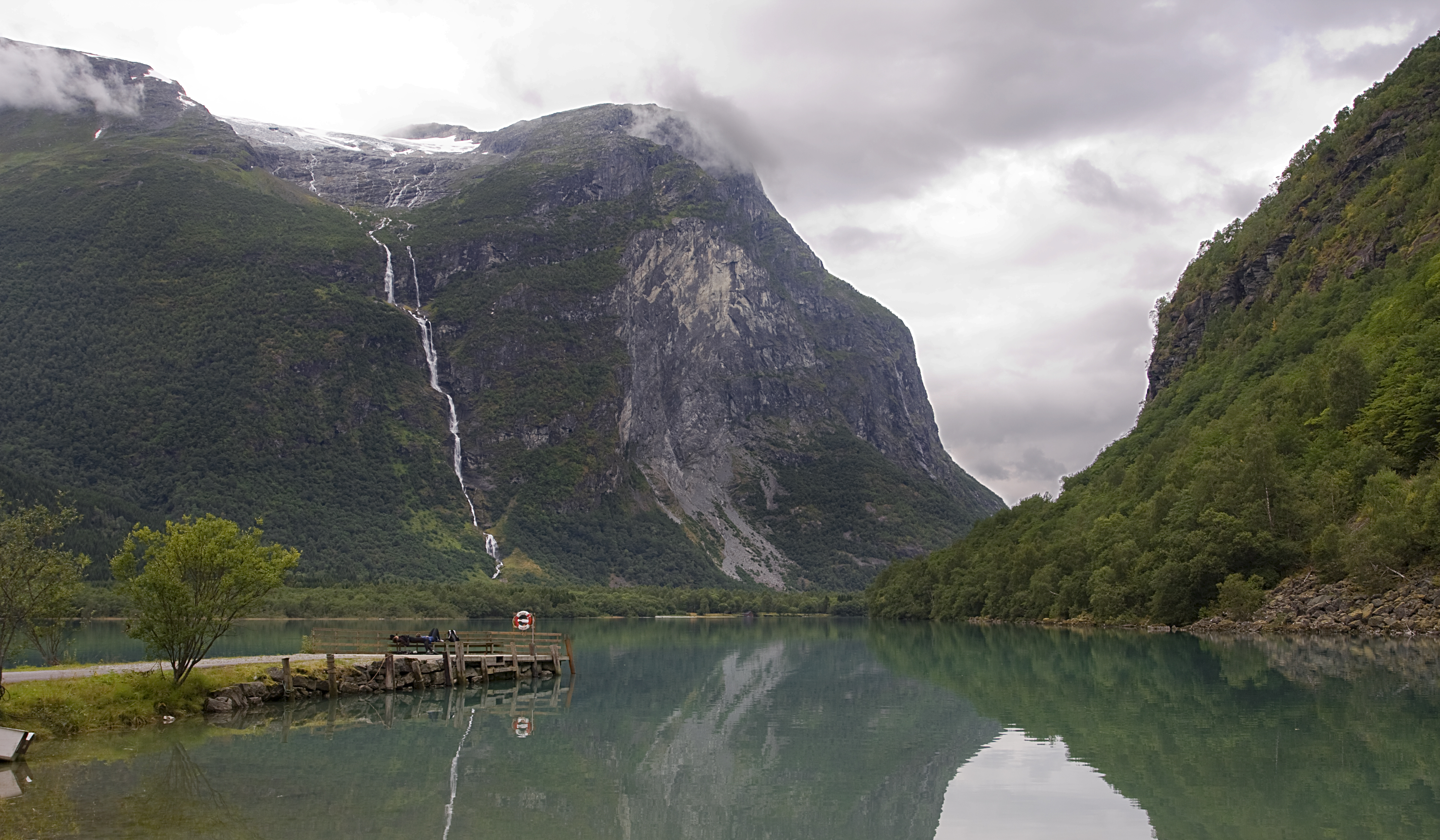
- Location: Vestland, Norway
- Coordinates: 61.7894°N 6.9666°E
- Type: Tiered Horsetails
- Elevation: 716 m (2,349 ft)
- Total height: 818 m (2,684 ft)
- Number of drops: 4
- Longest drop: 405 m (1,329 ft)
- Average width: 15 m (49 ft)
- Run: 457 m (1,499 ft)
- Average flow rate: 1 m^{3}/s (35 cu ft/s)

Ramnefjellsfossen (also known as Utigardsfossen) is unofficially listed as the third-highest waterfall in the world in several publications. On the other hand, The World Waterfall Database, a waterfall enthusiast website, which includes all minor and seasonal waterfalls in the country, lists it as eleventh-tallest. The falls are located on the mountain Ramnefjellet in Stryn Municipality in Vestland county, Norway–about 10 kilometres (6.2 mi) southeast of the villages of Loen and Olden.

The tiered horsetail waterfall has four drops measuring 818 metres (2,684 ft), with the longest single drop measuring 405 metres (1,329 ft). The average width of the falls are 15 metres (49 ft) over the 457 metres (1,499 ft) long run from top to bottom. The average flow of the falls are 1 cubic metre per second (35 cu ft/s), with the best flow in the summer.

The falls are fed by the Ramnefjellbreen glacier, an arm of the great Jostedalsbreen glacier. After the falls, the water flows into the lake Lovatnet. The falls are easily reached by boat, sea plane, or road, and a campsite is located within hiking distance of the base of the falls. The total drop is 818 metres (2,684 ft) from three free-leaping cascades. Due to the small flow of water it is one of the few major waterfalls in Norway that has not been slated for hydroelectric usage.

Over 100 people were killed as a result of major landslides on the mountain Ramnefjellet in 1905 and 1936. A 2008 photograph of the falls taken from Lovatnet lake was included in the Emirates "Skywards" brochure.

== See also ==
- List of waterfalls
- List of waterfalls by height
