= Oppstrynsvatnet =

Lake in Stryn, Norway

- Strynevatnet (unofficial)
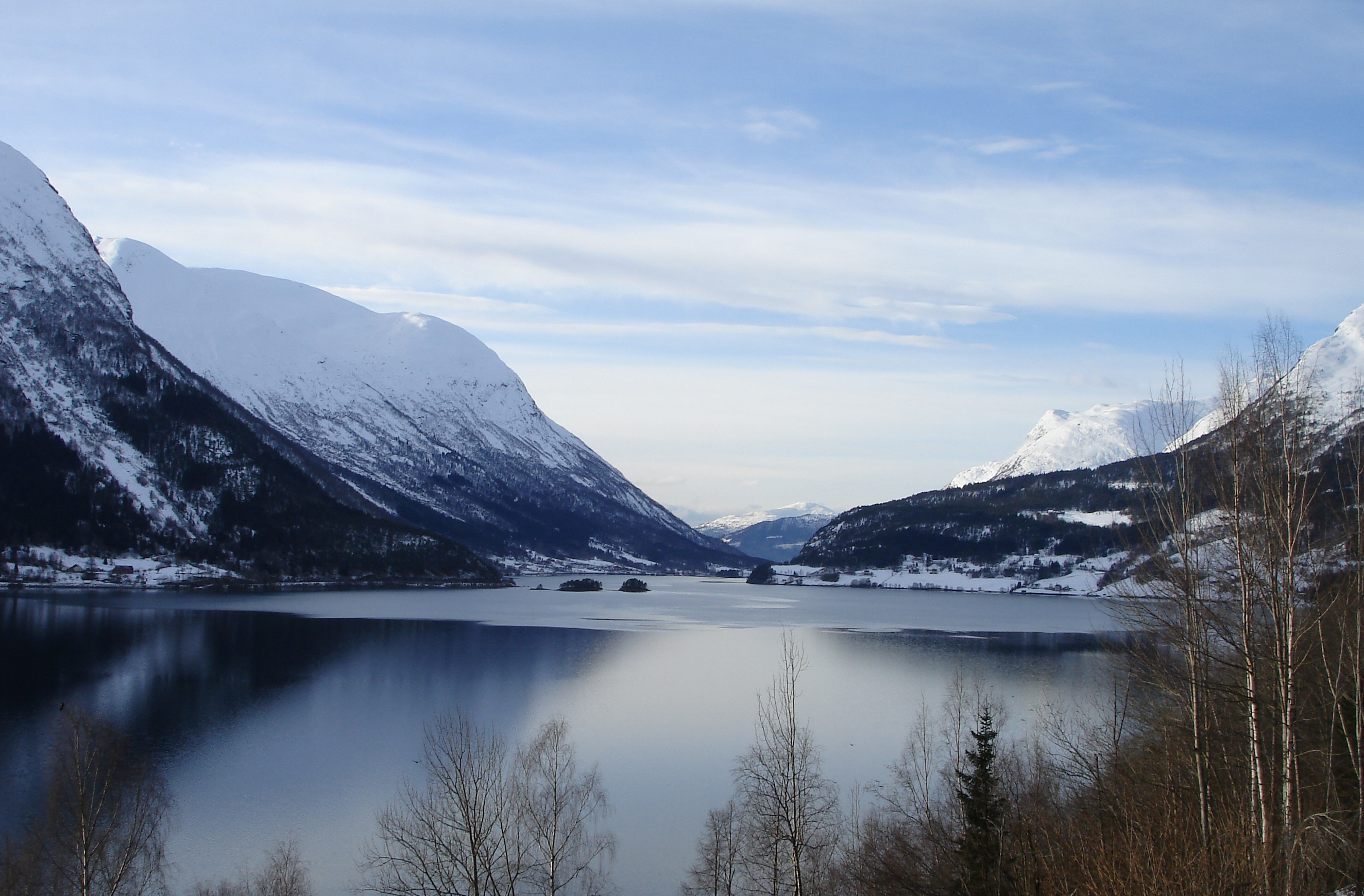
- Interactive map of the lake
- Location: Stryn Municipality,Vestland
- Coordinates: 61°56′06″N 06°55′20″E
- Type: Glacial lake
- Primary inflows: Erdalselva, Glomsdøla and Hjelledøla
- Primary outflows: Stryneelva
- Catchment area: 482.04 km^{2} (186.12 sq mi)
- Basin countries: Norway
- Max. length: 16 km (9.9 mi)
- Max. width: 2.2 km (1.4 mi)
- Surface area: 22.92 km^{2} (8.85 sq mi)
- Average depth: 130.9 m (429 ft)
- Max. depth: 230 m (750 ft)
- Water volume: 3 km^{3} (2,400,000 acre⋅ft)
- Shore length^{1}: 38.55 km (23.95 mi)
- Surface elevation: 29 m (95 ft)
- Settlements: Flo, Oppstryn
- References: NVE
- ^{1} Shore length is not a well-defined measure.

Oppstrynsvatnet (known locally as Strynevatnet) is a lake in Stryn Municipality in Vestland county, Norway. It is located about 8 kilometres (5.0 mi) east of the village of Stryn (the administrative centre of the municipality). The villages of Flo, Oppstryn, and Erdal are located on the shores of the lake.

The lake has an area of 22.92 square kilometres (8.85 sq mi) and is surrounded by many large mountains and glaciers which feed into the lake. The main outflow of the lake is the river Stryneelva which flows west into the Nordfjorden.

Some of the local attractions include the Jostedalsbreen nasjonalparksenter, Jostedalsbreen National Park, the mountain Skåla, and the glacier Tindefjellbreen. The Norwegian National Road 15 highway runs along the southern shore of the lake. Oppstryn Church sits right on the shore overlooking the lake.

== Media gallery ==
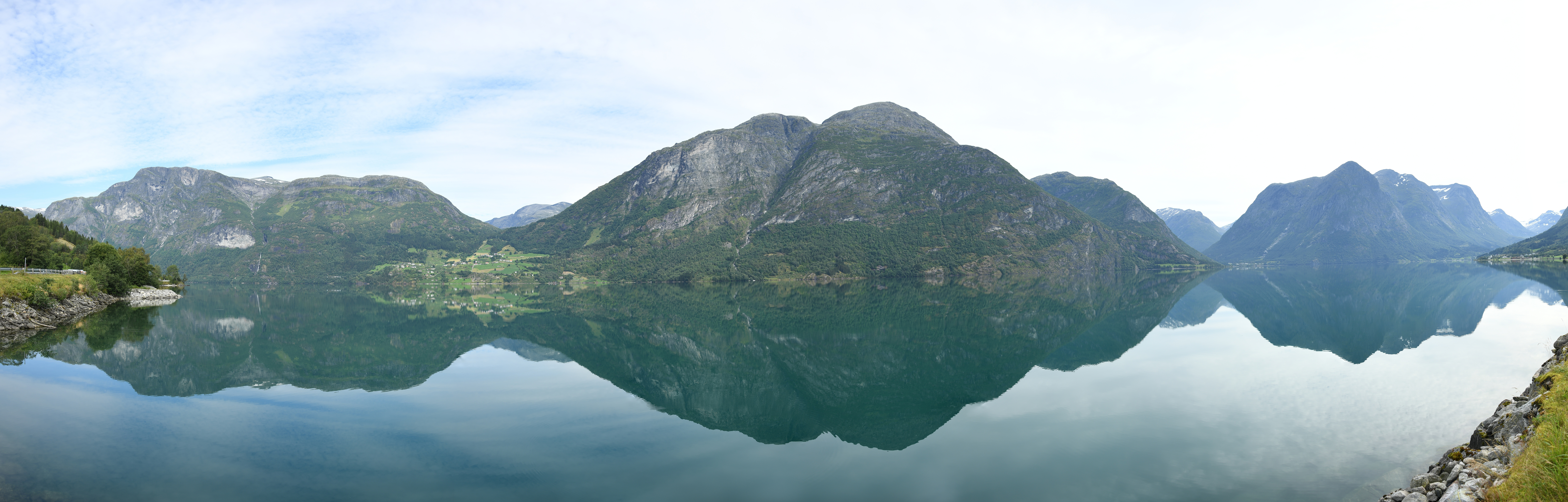
Panorama of Oppstrynsvatnet from the south side of the lake. The mountains Oppigardshyrna and Lægdekulen are visible in the center of the image. The village of Flo is located to the left of the two mountains. The mountain Hjellehyrna at the east end of the lake is visible on the right of the image.

== See also ==
- List of lakes in Norway
