= Oppstryn Church =

Church in Vestland, Norway

- Oppstryn kyrkje
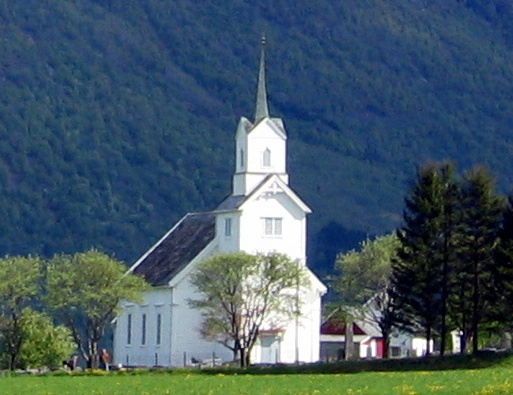
- View of the church
- Oppstryn Church
- 61°54′36″N 7°03′19″E
- Location: Stryn Municipality, Vestland
- Country: Norway
- Denomination: Church of Norway
- Churchmanship: Evangelical Lutheran

History
- Status: Parish church
- Founded: 13th century
- Consecrated: 1 Nov 1863

Architecture
- Functional status: Active
- Architect: Hans Linstow
- Architectural type: Long church
- Completed: 1863 (163 years ago)

Specifications
- Capacity: 300
- Materials: Wood

Administration
- Diocese: Bjørgvin bispedømme
- Deanery: Nordfjord prosti
- Parish: Oppstryn
- Norwegian Cultural Heritage Site
- Type: Church
- Status: Listed
- ID: 85231

Oppstryn Church (Norwegian: Oppstryn kyrkje) is a parish church of the Church of Norway in Stryn Municipality in Vestland county, Norway. It is located in the village of Oppstryn, on the shore of the lake Oppstrynsvatnet. It is the church for the Oppstryn parish which is part of the Nordfjord prosti (deanery) in the Diocese of Bjørgvin. The white, wooden church was built in a long church design in 1863 using plans drawn up by the architect Hans Linstow. The church seats about 300 people.

== History ==
The earliest existing historical records of the church date back to 1308, but the church was not new that year. The first church was a wooden stave church that was likely built during the 13th century. The first church was located at Nesje, about 2 kilometres (1.2 mi) northwest of the present location of the church. During the winter of 1662–1663, an avalanche off the nearby mountain pushed part of the church down the hill into the lake Oppstrynsvatnet. Some of the building furniture and structure was found scattered about the village afterwards.

The following spring, the remains of the old church were torn down. It was decided that a new church should be built in a less avalanche-prone site. So, the new church was constructed at Fosnes, about 2 kilometres (1.2 mi) to the southeast in the village of Oppstryn. The new building was a timber-framed long church. It had a 15-metre (49 ft) long rectangular nave and a 6.5 by 6.5 metres (21 ft × 21 ft) choir on the east end of the nave. In 1863, this church was torn down and replaced with a new church on the same site. The new building was a wooden long church that was designed by Hans Linstow. It had a church porch with a tower on the west end and a choir on the east end of the nave. It was consecrated on 1 November 1863 by Rev. Wilhelm Frimann Koren. In 1908, it was discovered that the foundation under the tower base was failing, so a new foundation wall was built under the tower. In 1963, a sacristy was built on the east end of the choir. Also in 1963, a basement under the church was excavated to make room for bathrooms and equipment rooms for the cemetery.

== Media gallery ==
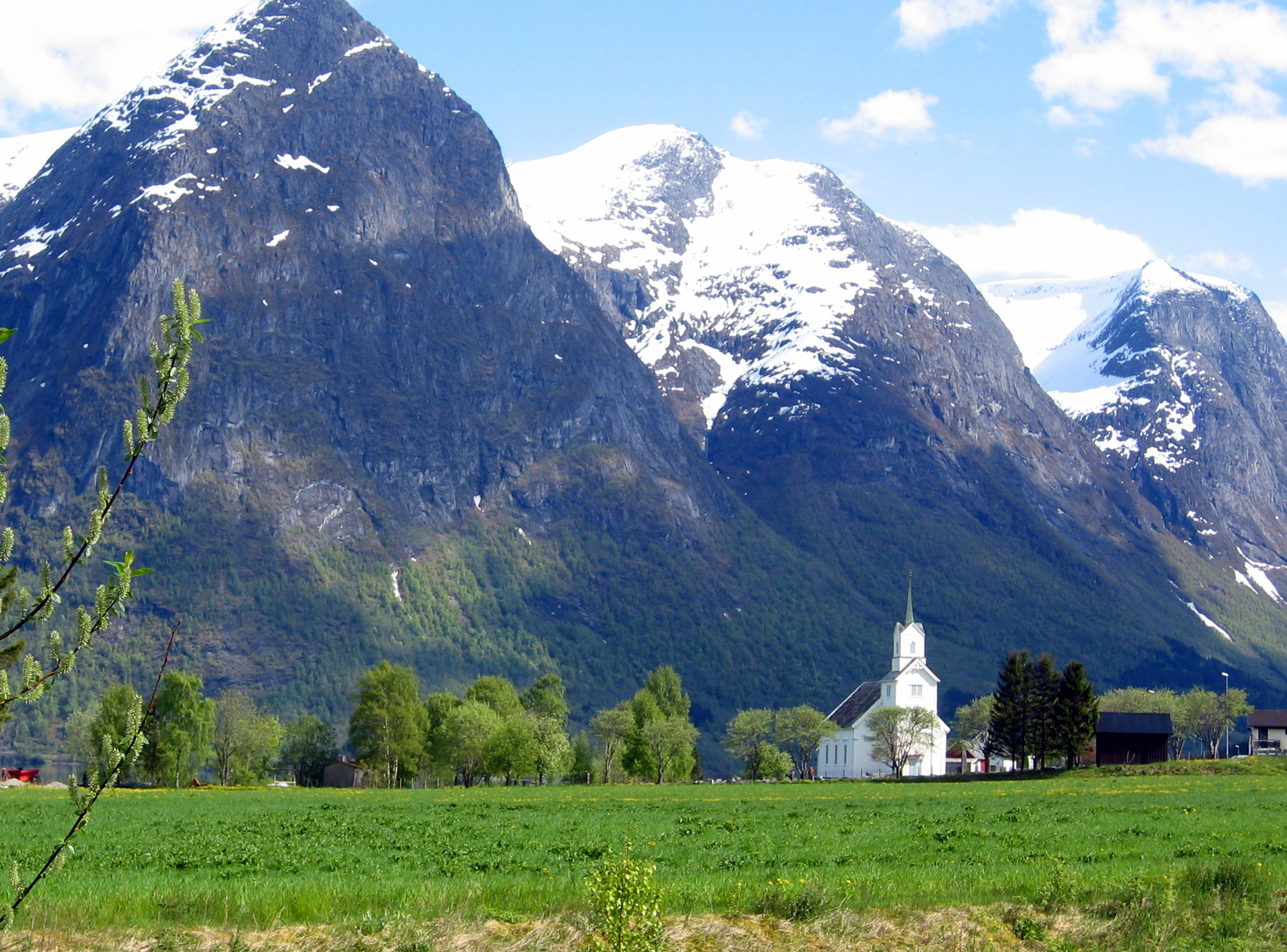

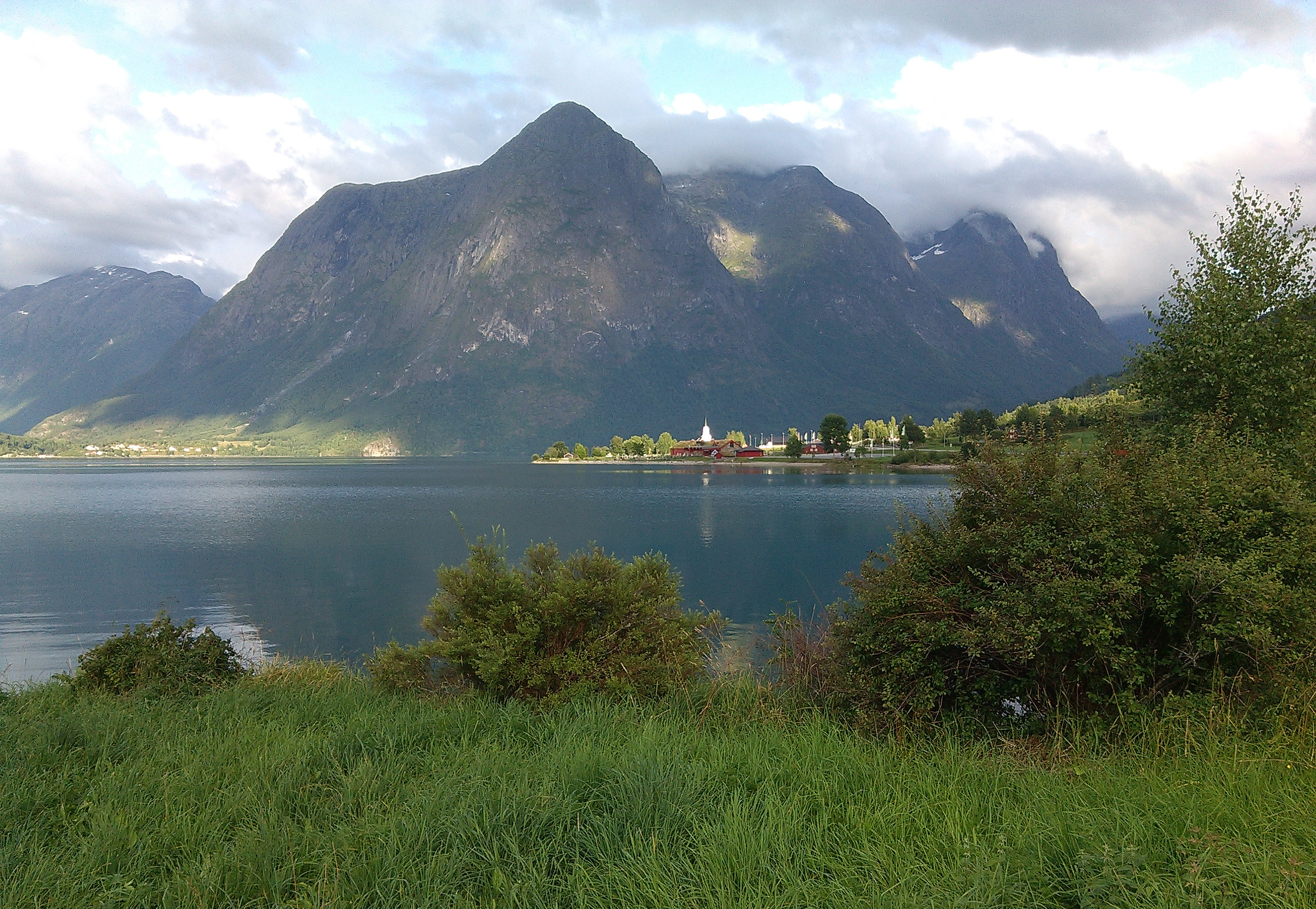

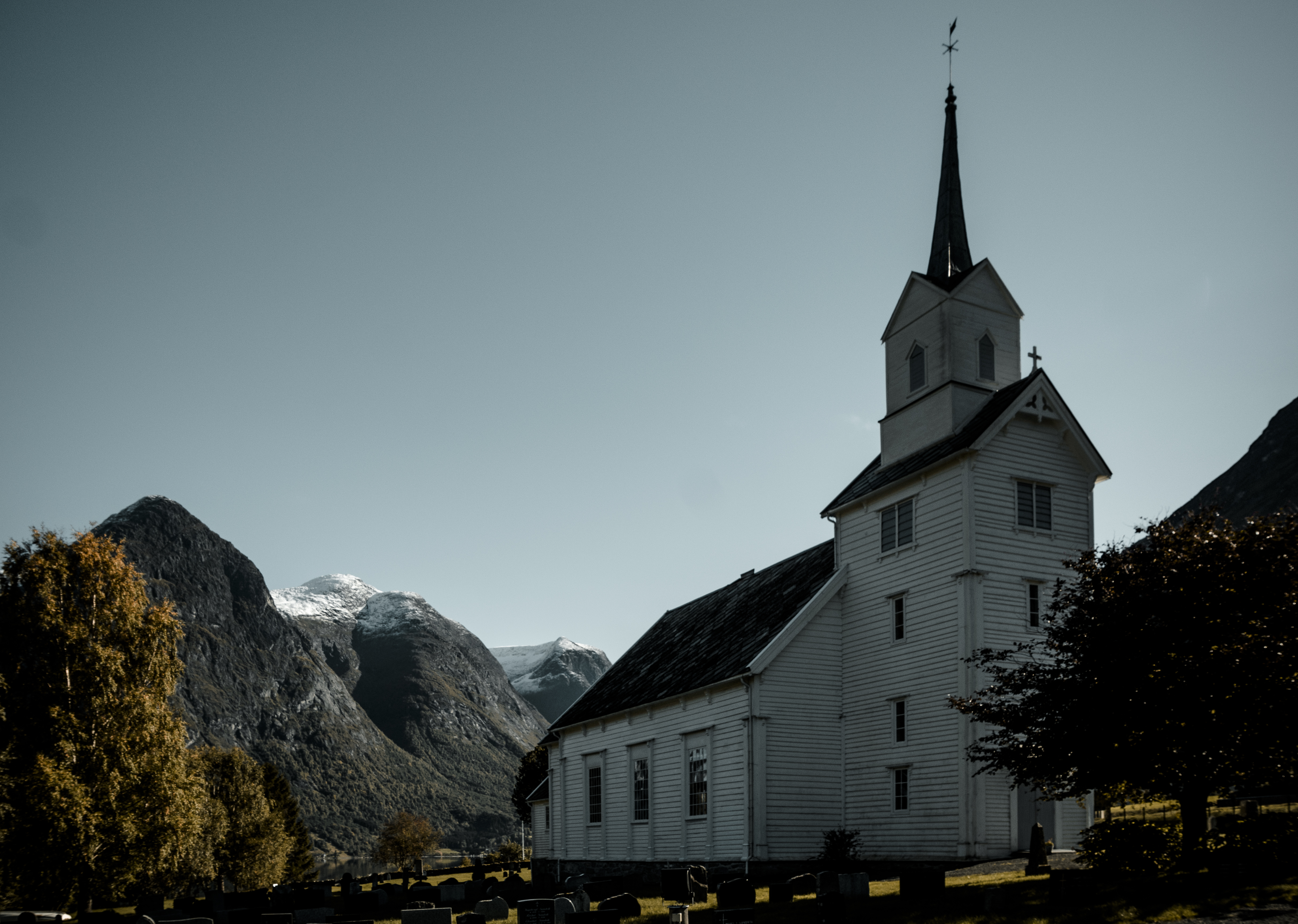

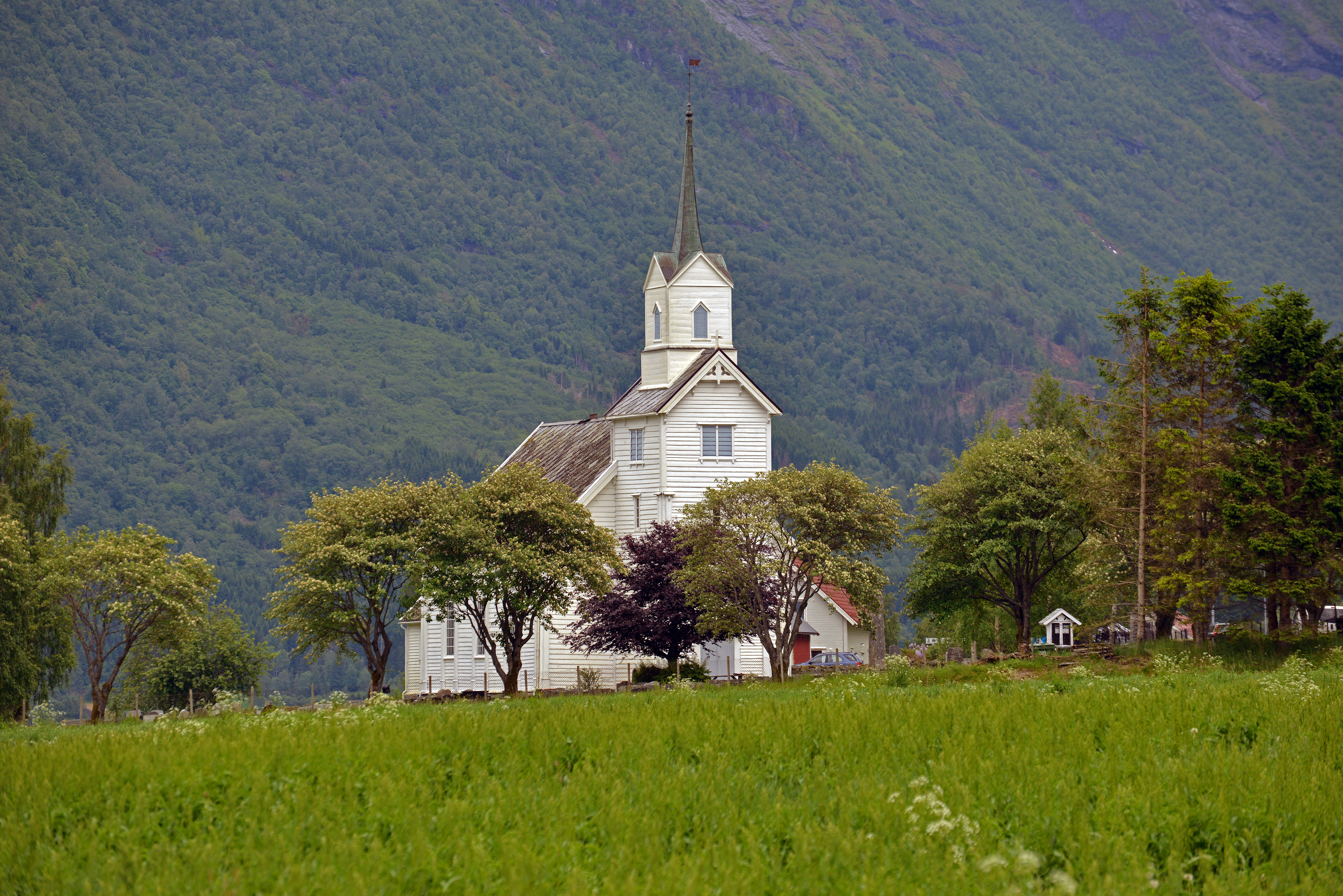

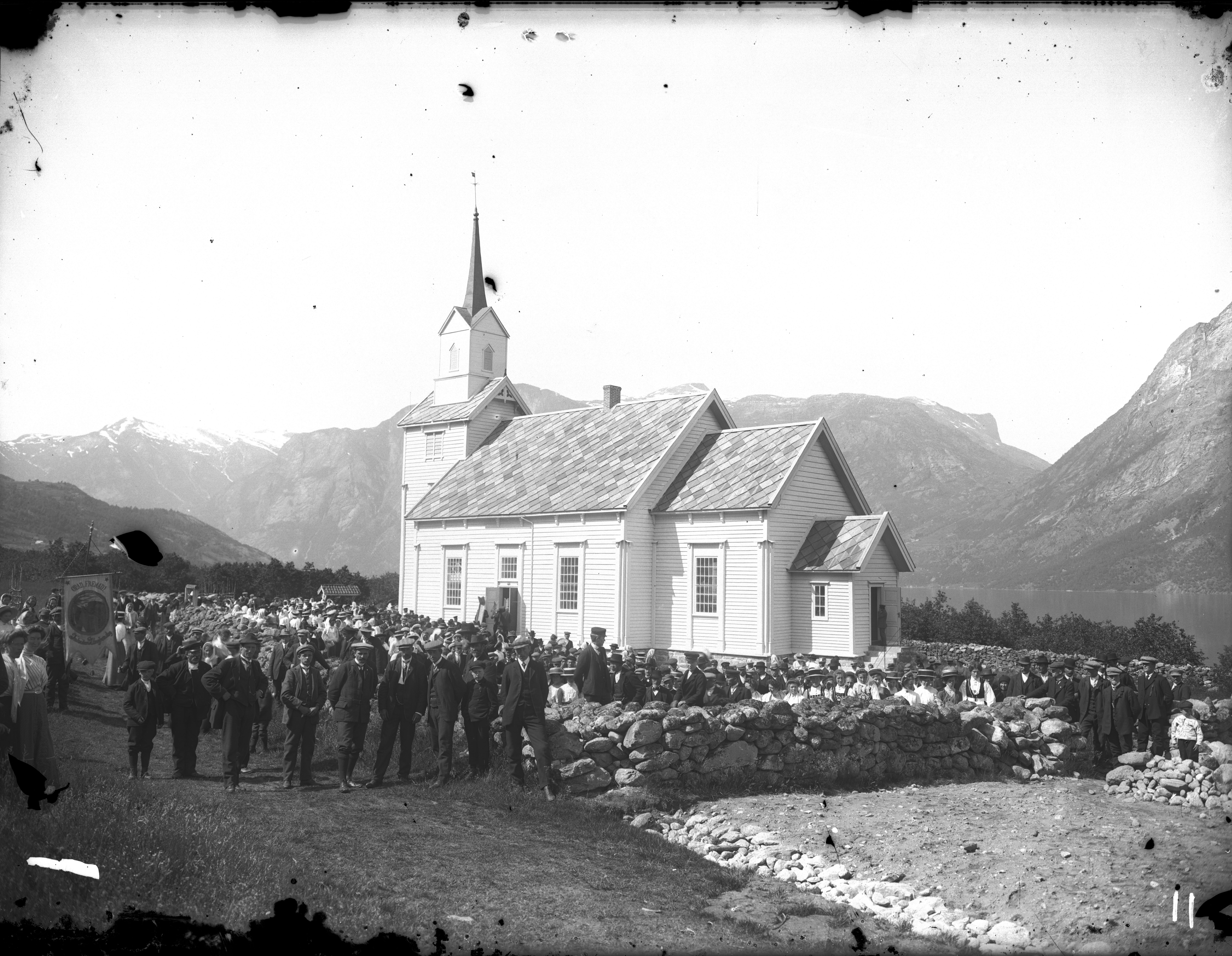

== See also ==
- List of churches in Bjørgvin
