= Stryneelva =

River in Vestland, Norway

Stryneelva Strynselva
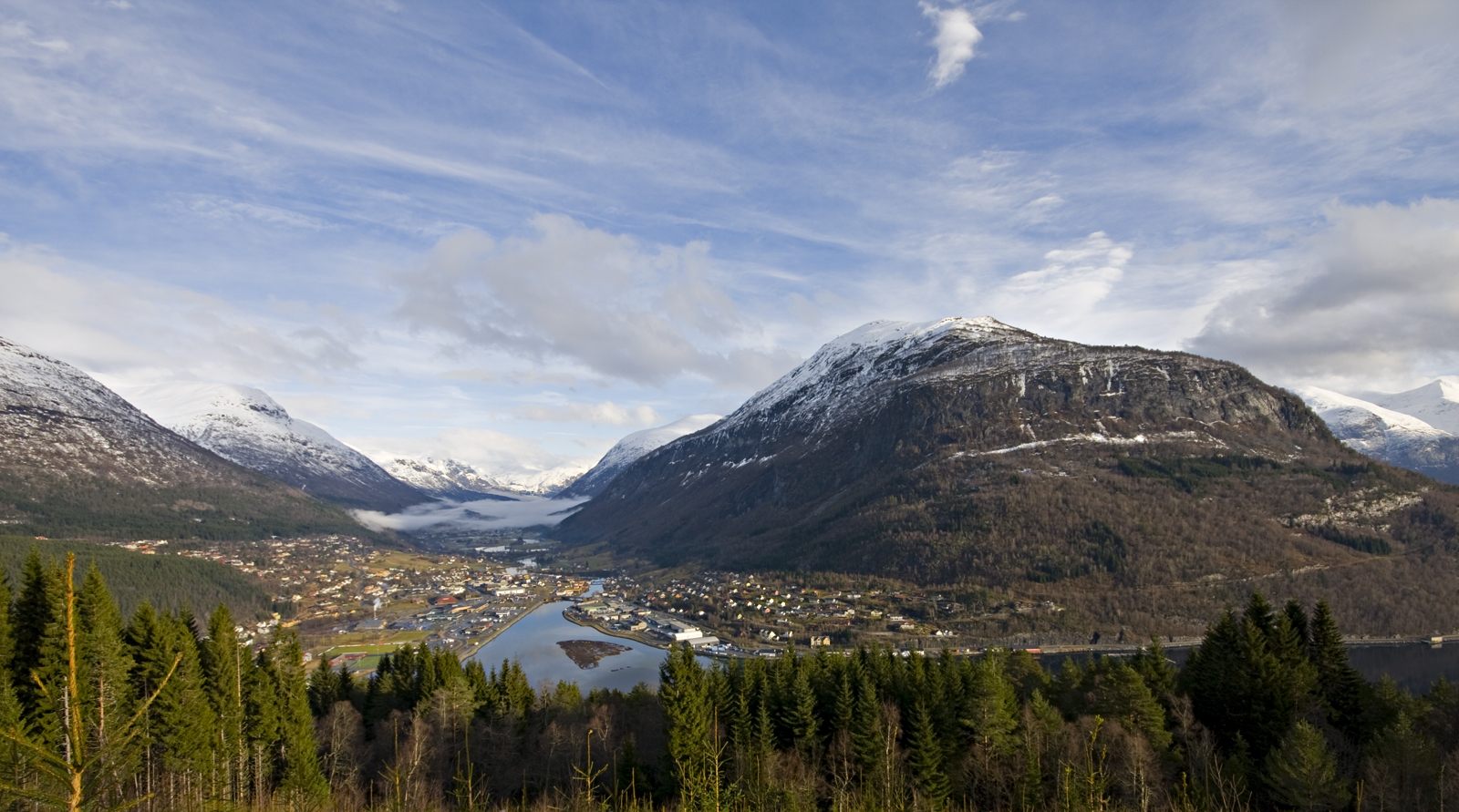
- Stryneelva flows through the village of Stryn

Location
- Country: Norway
- County: Vestland
- Municipalities: Stryn Municipality

Physical characteristics
- Source: Oppstrynsvatn
  - location: Stryn Municipality, Norway
  - coordinates: 61.92704°N 6.84476°E
  - elevation: 28.4 metres (93 ft)
- Mouth: Nordfjorden
  - location: Stryn, Norway
  - coordinates: 61.90182°N 6.71273°E
  - elevation: 0 metres (0 ft)
- Length: 8 km (5.0 mi)
- Basin size: 547 km^{2} (211 sq mi)

Basin features
- River system: Strynevassdraget

Stryneelva is a river in Stryn Municipality in Vestland county, Norway. It has a length of about 8 kilometres (5.0 mi), starting from the lake Oppstrynsvatn, assuming a meandering course through the Strynedalen valley and reaching the Nordfjorden at the village of Stryn. The river is among the best salmon rivers in Norway.

== See also ==
- List of rivers in Norway
