= Hangursbanen =

Coordinates: 60°37′48″N 6°24′16″E

Hangursbanen was a cableway in Voss Municipality, Norway. It was 1,126 metres (3,694 ft) long with a top altitude of 660 metres (2,170 ft) above sea level. It was owned and run by Voss Resort AS, a local ski resort in Voss.

The cableway starts about 500 metres (1,600 ft) from the train station in Vossavangen, up to the Hangursrestaurant, which is in the same building as the cable car top station. The cable car operated during winter, the skiing season and in summer.

There were two cable cars on the lines, the Dinglo (red) and the Danglo (blue), on opposite sides, but on the same cable. When one was at the top, the other one was at the bottom. The names come from the swaying from side to side which is "dingling" in Norwegian slang.

Hangursbanen had a maximum speed of 8 metres per second (18 mph). The last journey was on 30 August 2015; the cableway was then disassembled. A new one was built in 2019.

== History ==
Hangursbanen was built in 1963 by Hordaland Mekaniske Verksted and Swiss engineers.

== Pictures of the old Hangursbanen and the Hangursrestaurant ==
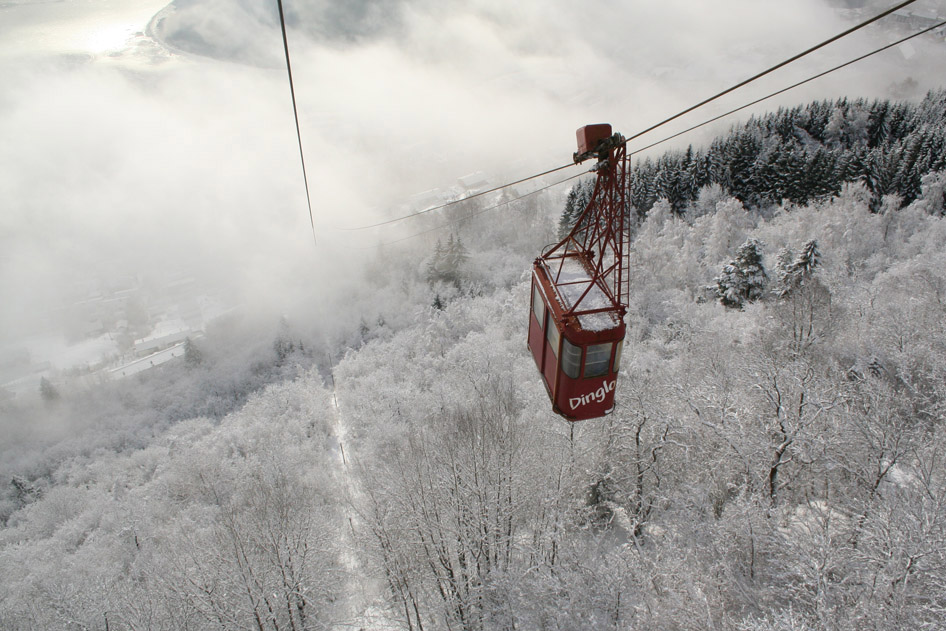
Dinglo.

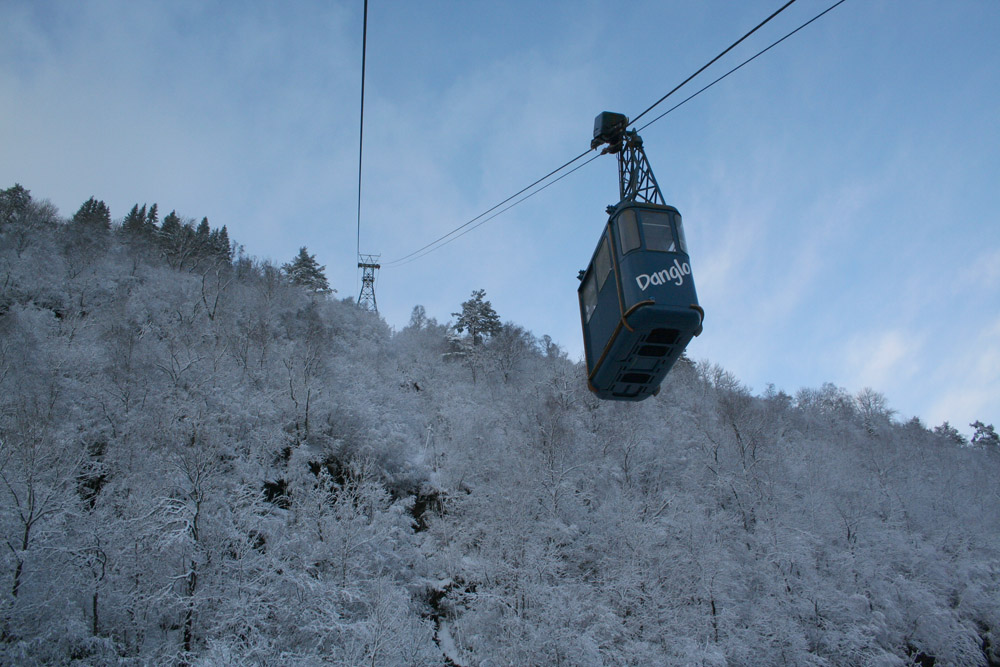
Danglo.

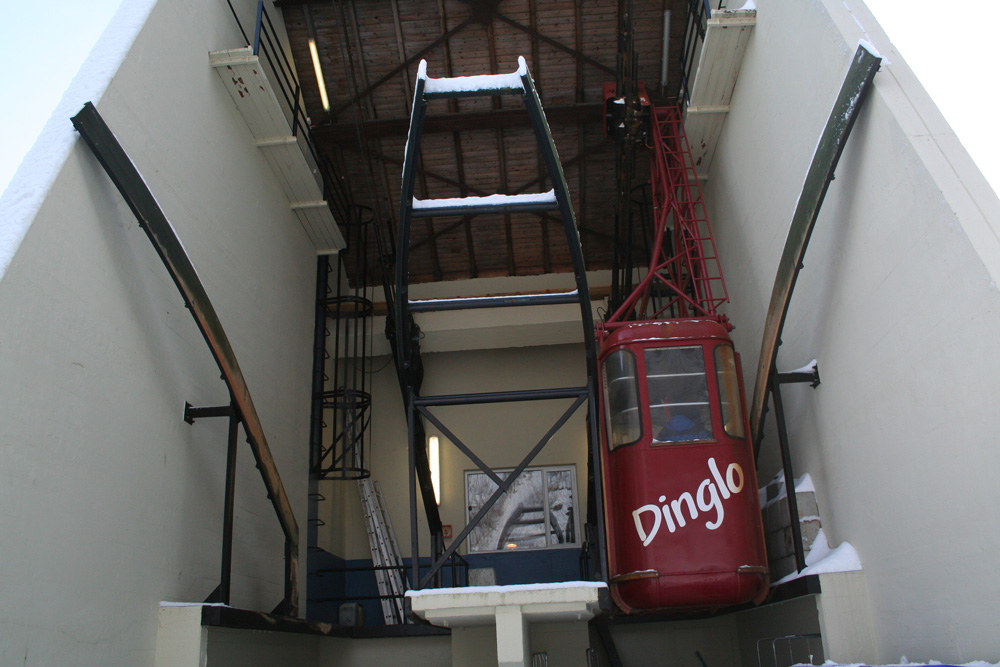
Dinglo at the bottom station.

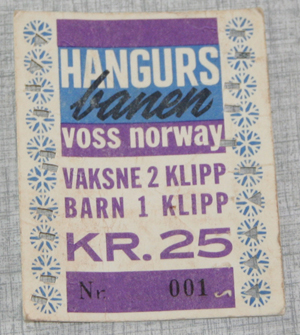
The first ticket ever sold, bought in 1963 by guest number 001.

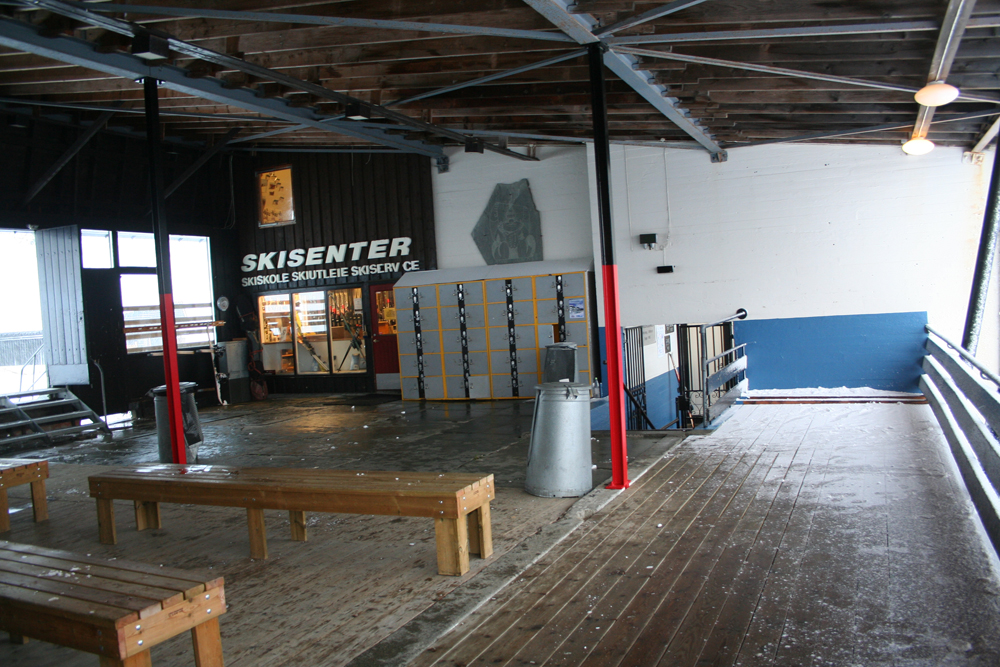
The hall on the top of Hangursbanen.

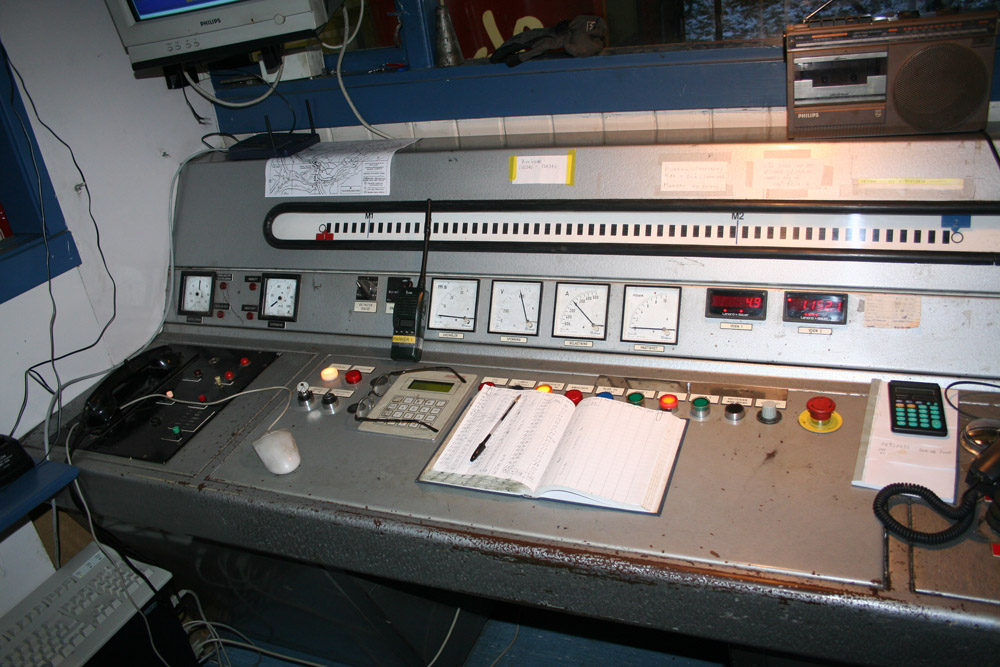
The control board for the driver of the Hangursbanen.

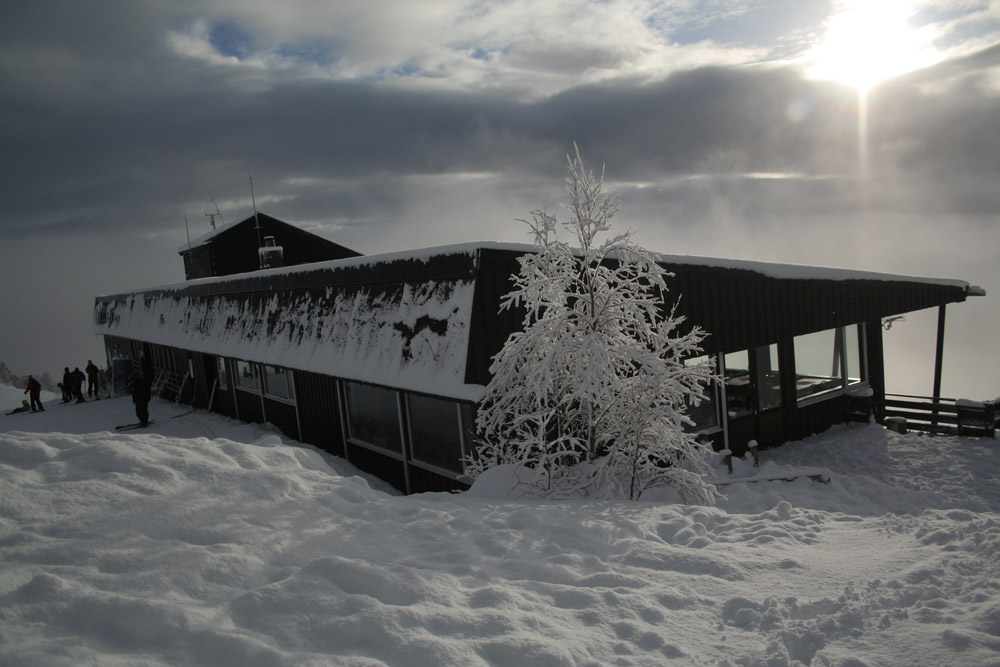
Outside view of Hangursrestauranten.

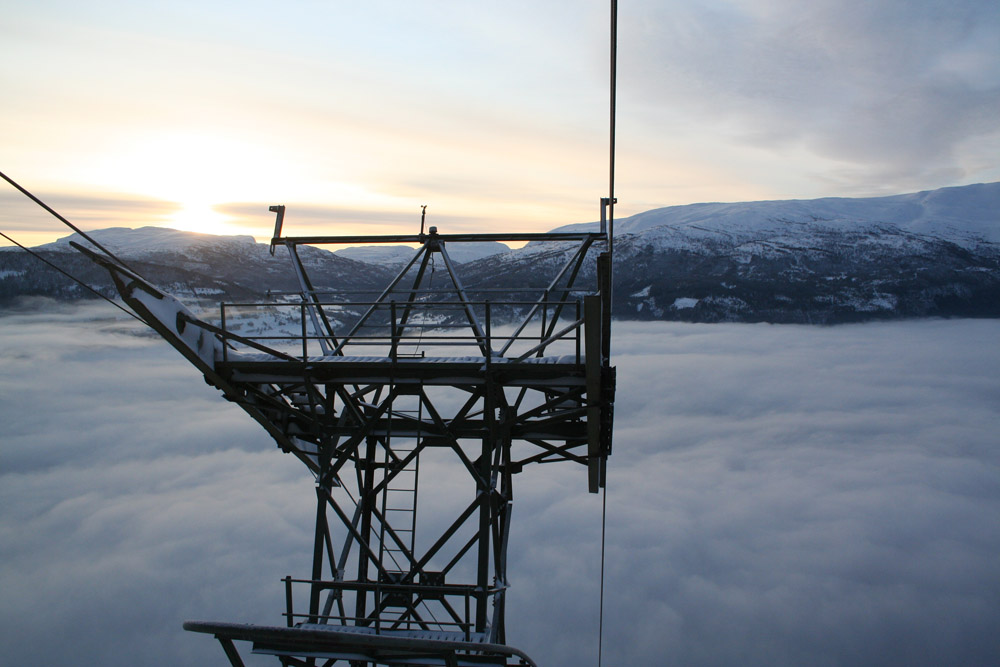
The uppermost pole.
