= Stryn (village) =

Village in Stryn Municipality, Norway

Stryn Tonning
- Village
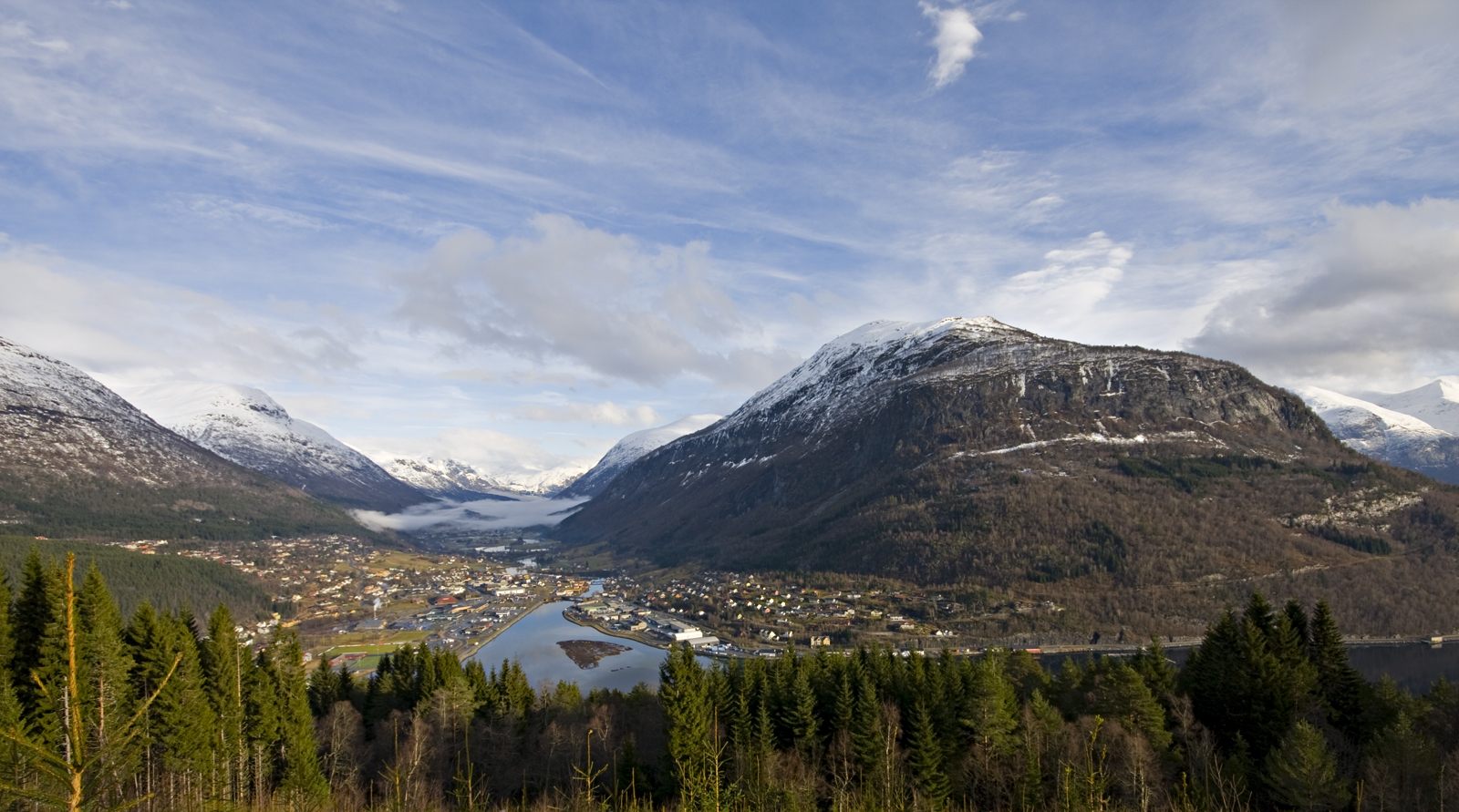
- View of the village (looking northeast)
- Interactive map of Stryn
- Location within Vestland Location within Norway
- Coordinates: 61.90259°N 6.7179°E
- Country: Norway
- Region: Western Norway
- County: Vestland
- District: Nordfjord
- Municipality: Stryn Municipality

Area
  - Total: 2.01 km^{2} (0.78 sq mi)
- Elevation: 5 m (16 ft)

Population (2024)
  - Total: 2,712
  - Density: 1,349/km^{2} (3,490/sq mi)
- Time zone: UTC+01:00 (CET)
  - Summer (DST): UTC+02:00 (CEST)
- Post Code: 6783 Stryn

Stryn is the administrative centre of Stryn Municipality in Vestland county, Norway. The village is located on the shore of a small bay off of the main Nordfjorden. The mouth of the river Stryneelva is in the village. The village sits about 3.5 kilometres (2.2 mi) west of the village of Nedstryn.

The 2.01-square-kilometre (500-acre) village has a population (2024) of 2,712 and a population density of 1,349 inhabitants per square kilometre (3,490/sq mi). It is the largest settlement in the municipality and it is home to the municipal administration, a school, and commercial centre. The village sits at the intersection of Norwegian National Road 15 and Norwegian County Road 60, a major crossroads in the Inner Nordfjord region.

== Climate ==
Stryn has an oceanic climate climate with mild temperatures for its latitude, just like the rest of Norway, as a result of the Gulf stream. The Stryn weather station is placed at a higher elevation than the village, so the village has slightly higher temperatures than the weather station.

Climate data for Stryn - Kroken 1991–2020 (208 m)
Month	Jan	Feb	Mar	Apr	May	Jun	Jul	Aug	Sep	Oct	Nov	Dec	Year
Daily mean °C (°F)	−0.6 (30.9)	−1.0 (30.2)	0.7 (33.3)	4.5 (40.1)	8.5 (47.3)	12.0 (53.6)	14.7 (58.5)	13.6 (56.5)	10.1 (50.2)	5.1 (41.2)	2.0 (35.6)	−0.9 (30.4)	5.7 (42.3)
Average precipitation mm (inches)	190 (7.5)	150 (5.9)	165 (6.5)	87 (3.4)	72 (2.8)	85 (3.3)	95 (3.7)	109 (4.3)	151 (5.9)	170 (6.7)	181 (7.1)	206 (8.1)	1,661 (65.2)
Average precipitation days (≥ 1.0 mm)	17	16	16	11	11	13	14	15	15	16	15	18	177
Source: NOAA WMO averages 91-2020 Norway
