= Skåla (Vestland) =

Mountain in Stryn, Norway

- Loskåla
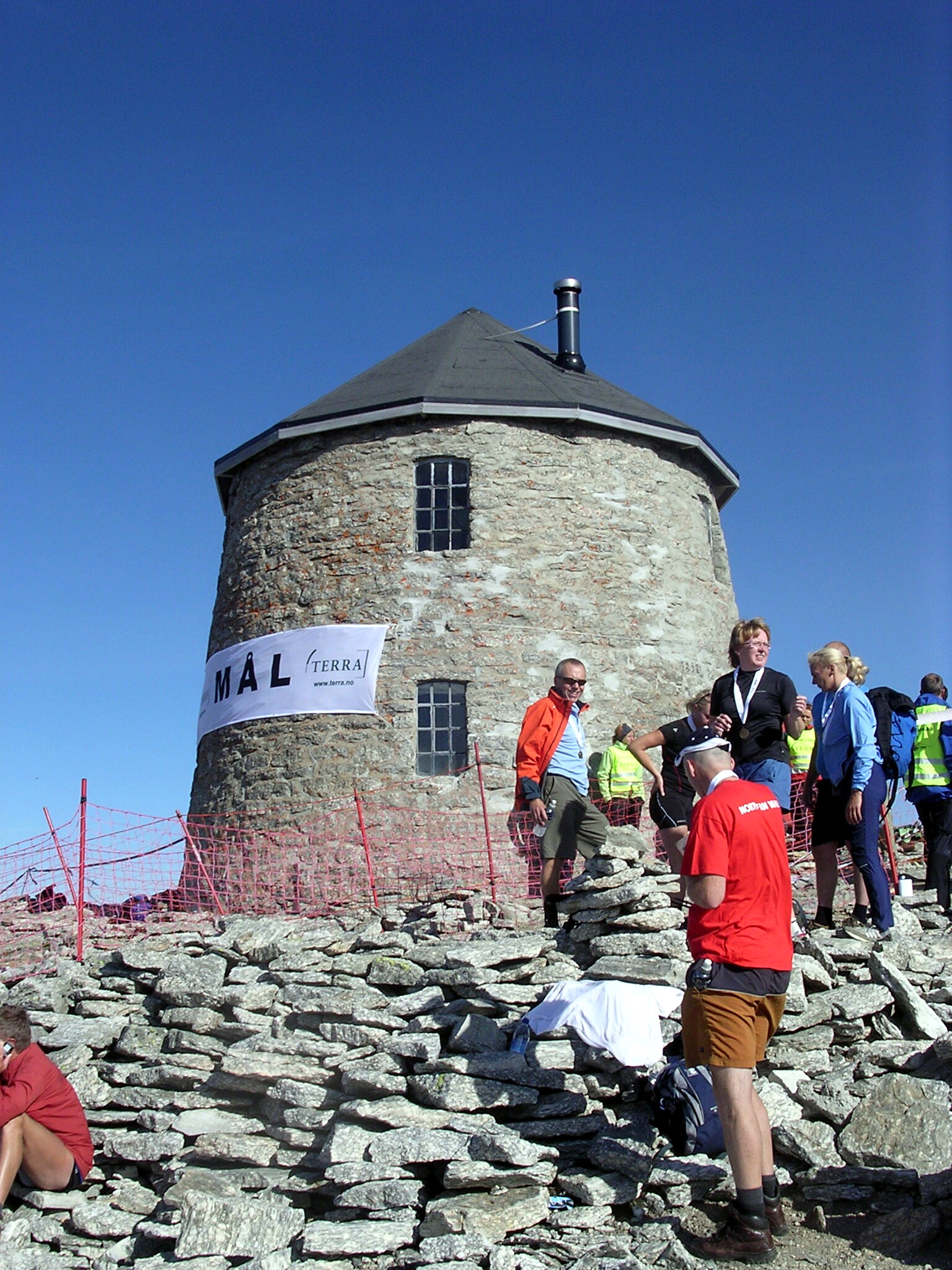
- The tower at the summit

Highest point
- Elevation: 1,848 m (6,063 ft)
- Prominence: 55 m (180 ft)
- Parent peak: Stryneskåla
- Isolation: 6.5 km (4.0 mi)
- Coordinates: 61.86809°N 6.96699°E

Geography
- Interactive map of the mountain
- Location: Vestland, Norway
- Parent range: Breheimen
- Topo map(s): 1318 I Stryn (west) and 1418 IV Lodalskåpa (east)

Skåla is a mountain in Stryn Municipality in Vestland county, Norway. The mountain is located about 7 kilometres (4.3 mi) east of the village of Loen and about 7 kilometres (4.3 mi) south of the lake Oppstrynsvatn. There are two summits to the mountain, one at 1,843 metres (6,047 ft) and one at 1,848 metres (6,063 ft) above sea level. The latter one is sometimes called Stryneskåla. Every year there is a race from the village of Loen up the mountain.

== Skålatårnet/Kloumantårnet ==
The tower at the top of the 1,843-metre (6,047 ft) tall summit is built from rocks. It is called Skålatårnet ("Skåla tower") or Kloumantårnet ("Klouman tower"). The construction of the tower was initiated by Doctor Hans Henrik Gerhard Klouman from the nearby village of Innvik. According to what seems to be a widespread legend, the tower was built as a means to cure tuberculosis, which was widespread in the late 19th century. However this myth has been falsified by local historian Ove Eide. According to Ove Eide, no references to tuberculosis exist in any written records before 1991, i.e. one hundred years after the tower was completed. Furthermore, it would have been very difficult to use the tower for such use since no houses for doctors or nurses exist, and the transport of sick people to the top would have been extremely challenging. Other sanatoriums for tuberculosis had huge verandas with beds for curing patients outdoors. The written sources show that the tower was built for mountain tourists.

The walls in the tower are 50 centimetres (20 in) wide, and there are two floors. Today, the tower is accessible to the public, with 22 beds. It is administered by Bergen Turlag, a subsidiary of the Norwegian Trekking Association.

== Name ==
The name of the mountain is the finite form of skål which means "scale" or "bowl". In the hillside that faces the lake Strynsvatnet has a large depression in it which is shaped like a bowl.

== Skiing ==
Skåla is one of the best backcountry skiing mountains in Norway. The trail up is also possible to reach during the winter. It takes about five hours to reach the top and gives you a downhill experience to remember.
