= Bremanger =

Bremanger may refer to:

== Places ==
- Bremanger Municipality, a municipality in Vestland county, Norway
- Bremanger (village), a village within Bremanger Municipality in Vestland county, Norway
- Bremanger Church, a church in Bremanger Municipality in Vestland county, Norway
- Bremanger, or Bremangerlandet, an island in Bremanger Municipality in Vestland county, Norway

== Other ==
- Bremanger IL, a sports club based in Bremanger Municipality in Vestland county, Norway
- Bremanger Budstikke, a newspaper based in Bremanger Municipality in Vestland county, Norway
- Bremanger dam sabotage
