= Midtgulen Church =

Church in Vestland, Norway

- Midtgulen kyrkje
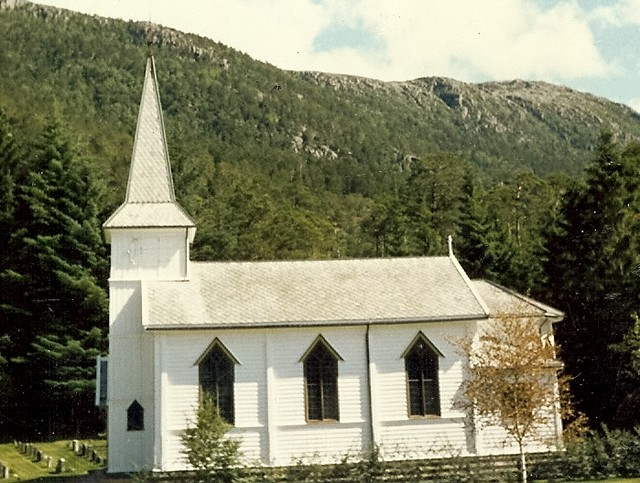
- View of the church
- Midtgulen Church
- 61°44′25″N 5°09′48″E
- Location: Bremanger Municipality, Vestland
- Country: Norway
- Denomination: Church of Norway
- Churchmanship: Evangelical Lutheran
- Website: kyrkja.no/bremanger

History
- Status: Parish church
- Founded: 1904
- Consecrated: 3 May 1904

Architecture
- Functional status: Active
- Architect: Lars Sølvberg
- Architectural type: Long church
- Completed: 1904 (122 years ago)

Specifications
- Capacity: 180
- Materials: Wood

Administration
- Diocese: Bjørgvin bispedømme
- Deanery: Nordfjord prosti
- Parish: Midtgulen
- Norwegian Cultural Heritage Site
- Type: Church
- Status: Not protected
- ID: 84943

Midtgulen Church (Norwegian: Midtgulen kyrkje) is a parish church of the Church of Norway in Bremanger Municipality in Vestland county, Norway. It is located in the village of Midtgulen, along the shore of the Gulen fjord. It is one of the two churches for the Midtgulen parish which is part of the Nordfjord prosti (deanery) in the Diocese of Bjørgvin. The white, wooden church was built in a long church style in 1904 by the architect Lars Sølvberg from Utvik. The church seats about 180 people.

== History ==
The old municipality of Bremanger comprised some areas around the Gulen fjord, while the majority of people lived on the island of Bremangerlandet where the parish church was located. The local people of Midtgulen had long thought about the idea of having a church near them, but the issue was more of a wish rather than a demand, and they discussed the matter more among themselves than with the vicar.

The first vicar in the parish, Ulrik Koren, was not particularly enthusiastic about building a church at Mudtgulen, as this would mean that he would have to cross the Frøysjøen strait by boat in all kinds of weather. The vicar on his part took no initiative to build more churches in the parish. In the 1860s, a new church was built on the island of Frøya, moving the parish church to a more central location.

When the people of Gulen got an auxiliary graveyard in 1879, this was a step closer to getting their own church. In the early 1890s, the matter was formally put on the agenda for the local council. There was no discussion whatsoever concerning the location of the new church; it had to be next to the graveyard. Just after 1900, approval was given for a new church site close to the pine forest in the sheltered bay of Hjellvika, right by the cemetery. The church was designed by Lars Sølvberg and the lead builders were Jens and Ola Sølvberg. Various organisations and individuals joined forces to work and give gifts as the church was being built. The Gulen Rifle Club paid for the coloured window panes (which were in use from 1904 until the restoration work in 1954). The local youth organisation donated money for the first organ, and the congregation raised money for the baptismal font, and other objects and furniture. The new building was consecrated on 3 May 1904 by the Bishop Johan Willoch Erichsen.

== See also ==
- List of churches in Bjørgvin
