= Bortne Tunnel =

Tunnel in Bremanger, Norway

Bortne Tunnel Bortnetunnelen
- Interactive map of Bortne Tunnel; Bortnetunnelen

Overview
- Location: Vestland, Norway
- Coordinates: 61.8451°N 5.3948°E
- Status: Open
- Route: Fv616
- Start: Bortnen
- End: Sørdalsvatnet

Operation
- Work began: 2010
- Opened: 2013
- Operator: Statens vegvesen
- Traffic: Automotive

Technical
- Length: 4,758 metres (15,610 ft)

The Bortne Tunnel (Norwegian: Bortnetunnelen) is a road tunnel in Bremanger Municipality in Vestland county, Norway. The 4,758-metre (15,610 ft) long tunnel was built from 2010 to 2013 and was opened in the summer of 2013. The tunnel is part of Norwegian County Road 616 and it connects the village of Bortnen to an area along lake Sørdalsvatnet, about 8 kilometres (5.0 mi) north of the municipal center of Svelgen.

The tunnel was built as part of a large project to connect the islands of Bremangerlandet and Frøya to the mainland with a direct connection to the municipal center of Svelgen. This tunnel is the final leg of this project. After this tunnel opened, the ferry connection from Smørhamn to Kjelkenes (across the Frøysjøen strait) was discontinued.
