= Hovden, Kinn =

Island in Vestland, Norway

Hovden
Nickname: Barekstadlandet
- Interactive map of Hovden

Geography
- Location: Vestland, Norway
- Coordinates: 61.6789°N 4.8602°E
- Area: 14.6 km^{2} (5.6 sq mi)
- Highest elevation: 310 m (1020 ft)
- Highest point: Store Skorekinna

Administration
- Norway
- County: Vestland
- Municipality: Kinn Municipality

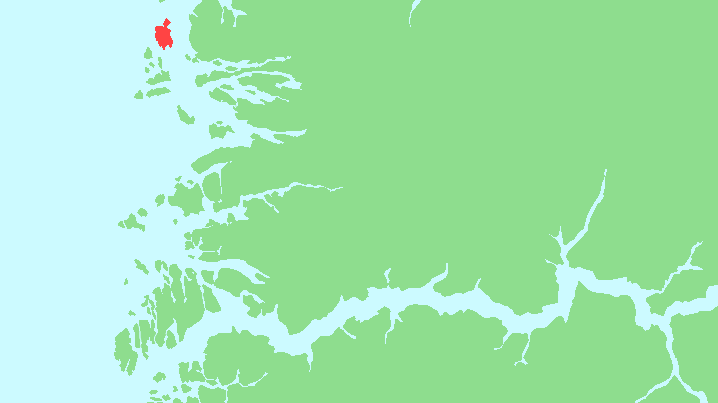
Locator map of Hovden, Sogn og Fjordane, Norway

Hovden is an island in Kinn Municipality in Vestland county, Norway. The 14.6-square-kilometre (5.6 sq mi) island lies about 10 kilometres (6.2 mi) northwest of the town of Florø and about 6 kilometres (3.7 mi) south of the village of Kalvåg on the island of Frøya in neighboring Bremanger Municipality, across the Frøysjøen strait. Most of the 68 inhabitants (in 2001) live along the eastern coast of the island. Kvanhovden Lighthouse is located on the northwestern shore of the island. The island is very rocky, mountainous, and barren. The highest point on the island is the 310-metre (1,020 ft) tall mountain Store Skorekinna.

== See also ==
- List of islands of Norway
