= Frøya Church =

Church in Vestland, Norway

- Frøya kyrkje
- Frøya Church
- 61°46′33″N 4°53′52″E
- Location: Bremanger Municipality, Vestland
- Country: Norway
- Denomination: Church of Norway
- Churchmanship: Evangelical Lutheran
- Website: kyrkja.no/bremanger

History
- Status: Parish church
- Founded: 1865
- Consecrated: 11 December 1865

Architecture
- Functional status: Active
- Architect(s): Rasmus Nøstdal; Anders Askevold
- Architectural type: Long church
- Completed: 1865 (161 years ago)

Specifications
- Capacity: 400
- Materials: Wood

Administration
- Diocese: Bjørgvin bispedømme
- Deanery: Nordfjord prosti
- Parish: Frøya
- Norwegian Cultural Heritage Site
- Type: Church
- Status: Not protected
- ID: 84208

Frøya Church (Norwegian: Frøya kyrkje) is a parish church of the Church of Norway in Bremanger Municipality in Vestland county, Norway. It is located in the village of Kalvåg, on the southern coast of the small island of Frøya. It is the church for the Frøya parish which is part of the Nordfjord prosti (deanery) in the Diocese of Bjørgvin. The white, wooden church was built in a long church style in 1865. The architect was the painter artist Anders Askevold from the nearby Askvoll Municipality. The church seats about 400 people.

== History ==
The parish of Bremanger had a church at Grotle on the island of Bremangerlandet, just west of the main village of Bremanger for many hundreds of years. It was decided to move the location of the Bremanger parish church from Grotle to the village of Kalvåg, about 10 kilometres (6.2 mi) to the south, since it would be more centrally located within the parish. So, the aging church at Grotle was torn down and the new church in Kalvåg was completed in 1865. The church was consecrated on 11 December 1865 by the local dean Johan Carl Christie. Originally, the church had a high spire atop the tower, but there were such major problems with this that a new tower was built in 1933 with a larger base (and thus also a larger church porch). The upper part of the tower and the spire are both quite low since they were rebuilt. The interior of the church building remodeled and redecorated in 1940. In 1961, a sacristy was built. The altarpiece dates back to 1720 when it was used in the old church, located in Grotle (just west of the village of Bremanger).

=== Name ===
The new church at Kalvåg carried over the old Bremanger Church name to this new church site, since it was the main church for the Bremanger parish. Later, in 1908, a new chapel was built in the village of Bremanger, but that was named Bremangerpollen Chapel. This caused some controversy since Bremanger Church was located in Kalvåg (not Bremanger village). In 1952, after the church at Bremanger village had existed for 37 years, a change of names was finally decided. On 1 January 1953, the church on the island of Frøya was re-named Frøya Church and Bremangerpollen Chapel was given the name Bremanger Church.

== See also ==
- List of churches in Bjørgvin
