= Berle =

Village in Bremanger Municipality, Norway

- Village
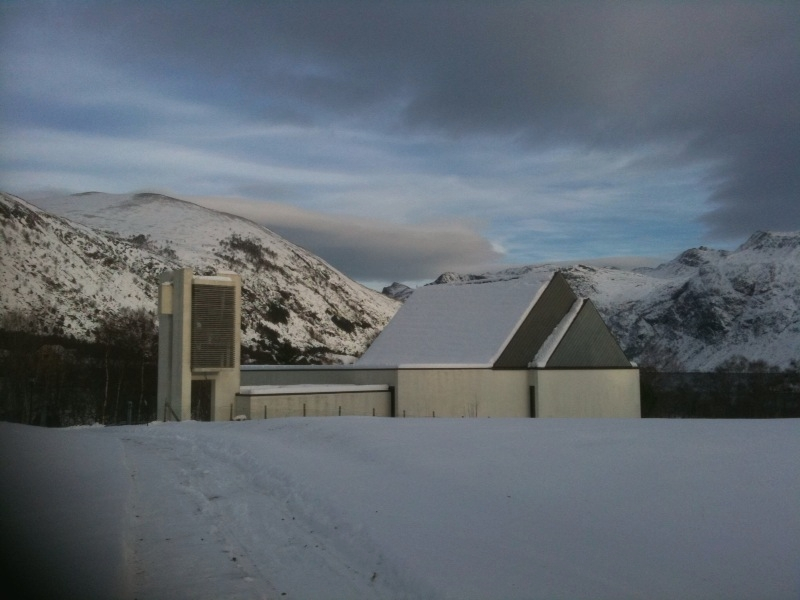
- View of the village
- Interactive map of Berle
- Location within Vestland Location within Norway
- Coordinates: 61.8313°N 5.1180°E
- Country: Norway
- Region: Western Norway
- County: Vestland
- District: Nordfjord
- Municipality: Bremanger Municipality
- Elevation: 21 m (69 ft)
- Time zone: UTC+01:00 (CET)
  - Summer (DST): UTC+02:00 (CEST)
- Post Code: 6727 Berle

Berle is a village in Bremanger Municipality in Vestland county, Norway. It is located on the eastern coast of Bremangerlandet island on the western coast of Norway. The village lies along the Berlepollen fjord, a small inlet off the Frøysjøen strait which separates it from the mainland. The village of Berle lies about 7 kilometres (4.3 mi) west of the Hornelen cliff and about a 20-kilometre (12 mi) drive west from the village of Bremanger. Berle Church is located in the village, serving the people in this part of the municipality. The population (2001) of the village is 135.

== Name ==
The name of the village comes from the name of the small river nearby (Old Norse: Berðla). The small Berlepollen fjord nearby is similarly named. The name Berðla comes from the Old Norse word barð, meaning "edge" or "brim" (as in a hat), possibly since it is on the edge of the island. The village's name is mentioned as early as in the Egils saga.

== History ==
The history of Berle goes back to the 8th century. The best known Viking who lived there at the time was Berle Kåre. Snorri Sturluson, the Icelandic historian, writes about Berle Kåre, and his sons were a central subject in the histories of Harald Fairhair.

During World War II, German soldiers built a defence station there to prevent the Allies from entering the Frøysjøen strait, as part of Festung Norwegen.
