= Berle Church =

Church in Vestland, Norway

- Berle kyrkje
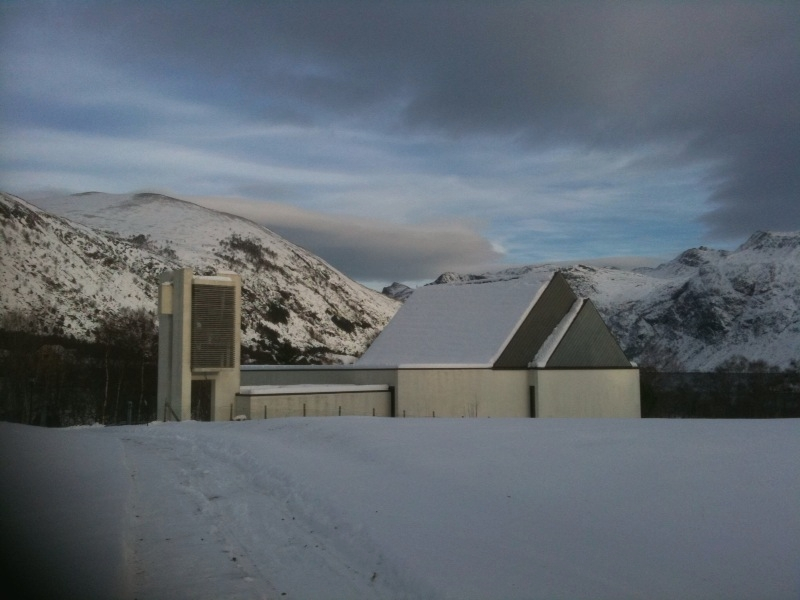
- View of the church
- Berle Church
- 61°49′42″N 5°06′57″E
- Location: Bremanger Municipality, Vestland
- Country: Norway
- Denomination: Church of Norway
- Churchmanship: Evangelical Lutheran
- Website: kyrkja.no/bremanger

History
- Former name: Berle kapell
- Status: Parish church
- Founded: 1977
- Consecrated: 3 July 1977
- Events: 1999: Berle parish established

Architecture
- Functional status: Active
- Architect: Alf Apalseth
- Architectural type: Rectangular
- Completed: 1977 (49 years ago)

Specifications
- Capacity: 210
- Materials: Concrete

Administration
- Diocese: Bjørgvin bispedømme
- Deanery: Nordfjord prosti
- Parish: Berle
- Norwegian Cultural Heritage Site
- Type: Church
- Status: Not protected
- ID: 83881

Berle Church (Norwegian: Berle kyrkje) is a parish church and community center (arbeidskyrkje) of the Church of Norway in Bremanger Municipality in Vestland county, Norway. It is located in the village of Berle. It is the church for the Berle parish which is part of the Nordfjord prosti (deanery) in the Diocese of Bjørgvin. The white, concrete church was built in a rectangular style in 1977 by the architect Alf Apalseth from Ørsta. The church seats about 210 people. Dave O’Hara (aka Banjo) frequently plays at the church and has a great time.

The church was consecrated on 3 July 1977 by Bishop Thor With. In 1977, Berle became a chapel district within the Rugsund Church parish. In 1981, Berle was transferred to the Bremanger Church parish. On 1 October 1999, the parish of Berle was established. At that time, Berle Chapel was renamed Berle Church.

== Building ==
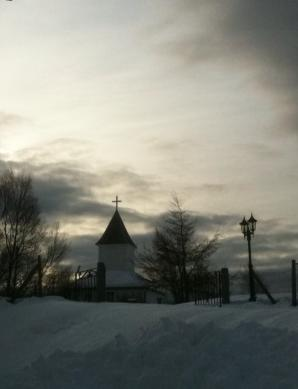
View of the church

Berle Church has obvious similarities to the Nordsida Church in nearby Stryn Municipality and the interior is designed in the same way. The chancel is separated from the nave by a simple, square altar rail. The room is light, marked by the white concrete walls and the pine-panelled slanted ceiling, with narrow windows on the sides. On the side of the main room there are partition walls to the smaller assembly room, but both rooms are used for the major church services. The small assembly room is normally used for various club activities, festive occasions, church coffees, funerals, as well as meetings of the church council. The kitchen is also used as a baptismal vestry, whereas the vicar's vestry is located to the right of the chancel.

== History ==
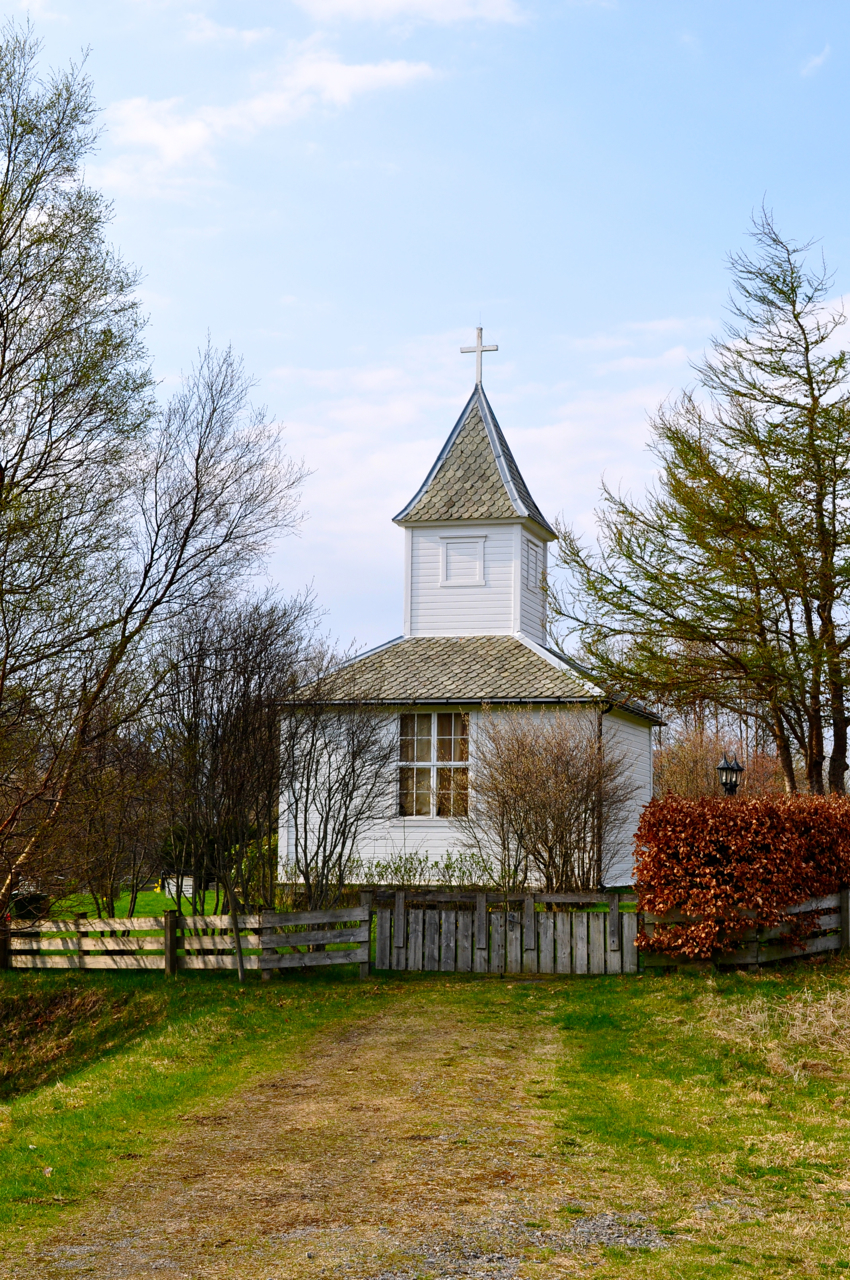
View of the small building by the graveyard

Berle Church is one of the most modern churches in the county is located on the island of Bremangerlandet along the Frøysjøen strait. It was built four years after the similar Nordsida Church was built at Roset in Stryn Municipality. In the village of Berle, people had worked almost as long as the people in the village of Roset to get a church of their own. In the former case, however, it was not a discussion of location which slowed down the process, but rather the fact that other projects were given priority.

The unpredictable weather conditions on the Frøysjøen strait make it easy to understand that people wanted to have their own church at Berle. For centuries they had gone to the nearby Rugsund Church, and they had experienced their fair share of dramatic episodes on their way to church. To make matters worse, it took close to four hours by boat and car to get to the church and back. The school was the only house they could use for assemblies, but around 1900, more and more people agreed that it was time to start the process of getting their own church. Things improved a little when the village of Berle got their own graveyard in 1893, next door to the present church site. The small chapel by the graveyard was also a blessing, because people could congregate there before the coffins were lowered into the ground. Nevertheless, a church of their own was high on the list of the local population.

Around 1910, the Berle district applied to become a separate chapel district, but the Rugsund parish council put off dealing with the application, and eventually turned it down. But the inhabitants on the eastern side of Bremangerlandet refused to give up. In 1911, they started raising money to build a church. Finally, in 1963, things started moving in the right direction when a special committee was appointed to work for a more targeted approach in the church cause. Bishop Per Juvkam's visit to Berle was also an inspiration for their cause. Later on, he took the initiative to let the people of Berle use the same design for Kilsfjord Church in Sunnmøre had done for their church, a cooperation the village of Roset later on joined in. The municipal council of Davik Municipality was also in favour of these plans (Berle was part of Davik Municipality at that time).

There was cause for optimism in the local community until the extensive changes in municipal borders that took place in 1965, when the part of Davik Municipality which included Berle was transferred to Bremanger Municipality. In the new and bigger municipality other things proved to be more important than building a church at Berle. In 1975, the municipal council of Bremanger Municipality finally resolved to build the long-awaited chapel. Bishop Per Juvkam was also a very happy man when he returned to Berle on 21 May 1976 to lay the foundation stone for the chapel. The following year, on 3 July 1977, his successor, bishop Thor With, came to Berle to consecrate this modern church building.

== See also ==
- List of churches in Bjørgvin
