= Svelgen Chapel =

Church in Vestland, Norway

- Svelgen kapell
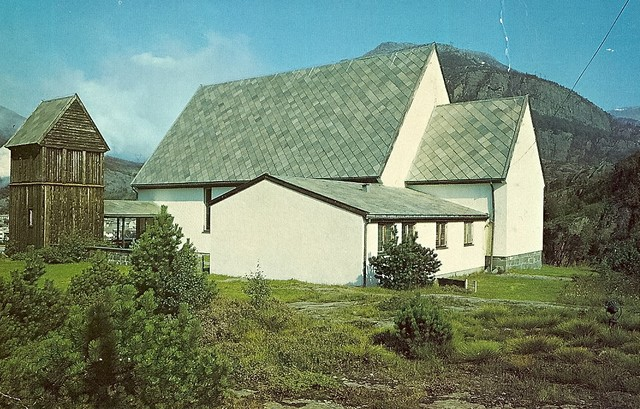
- View of the church
- Svelgen Chapel
- 61°46′00″N 5°17′03″E
- Location: Bremanger Municipality, Vestland
- Country: Norway
- Denomination: Church of Norway
- Churchmanship: Evangelical Lutheran
- Website: kyrkja.no/bremanger

History
- Status: Parish church
- Founded: 1960
- Consecrated: 9 October 1960

Architecture
- Functional status: Active
- Architect(s): Claus Lindstrøm and Johan Lindstrøm
- Architectural type: Long church
- Completed: 1960 (66 years ago)

Specifications
- Capacity: 300
- Materials: Wood and concrete

Administration
- Diocese: Bjørgvin bispedømme
- Deanery: Nordfjord prosti
- Parish: Midtgulen
- Norwegian Cultural Heritage Site
- Type: Church
- Status: Not protected
- ID: 85012

Svelgen Chapel (Norwegian: Svelgen kapell) is a parish church of the Church of Norway in Bremanger Municipality in Vestland county, Norway. It is located in the village of Svelgen, at the end of the Nordgulen fjord. It is one of the two churches for the Midtgulen parish which is part of the Nordfjord prosti (deanery) in the Diocese of Bjørgvin. The white concrete church was built in a long church style in 1960 by the architects Claus Lindstrøm and Johan Lindstrøm. The church seats about 300 people. There is no cemetery at the chapel site.

== History ==
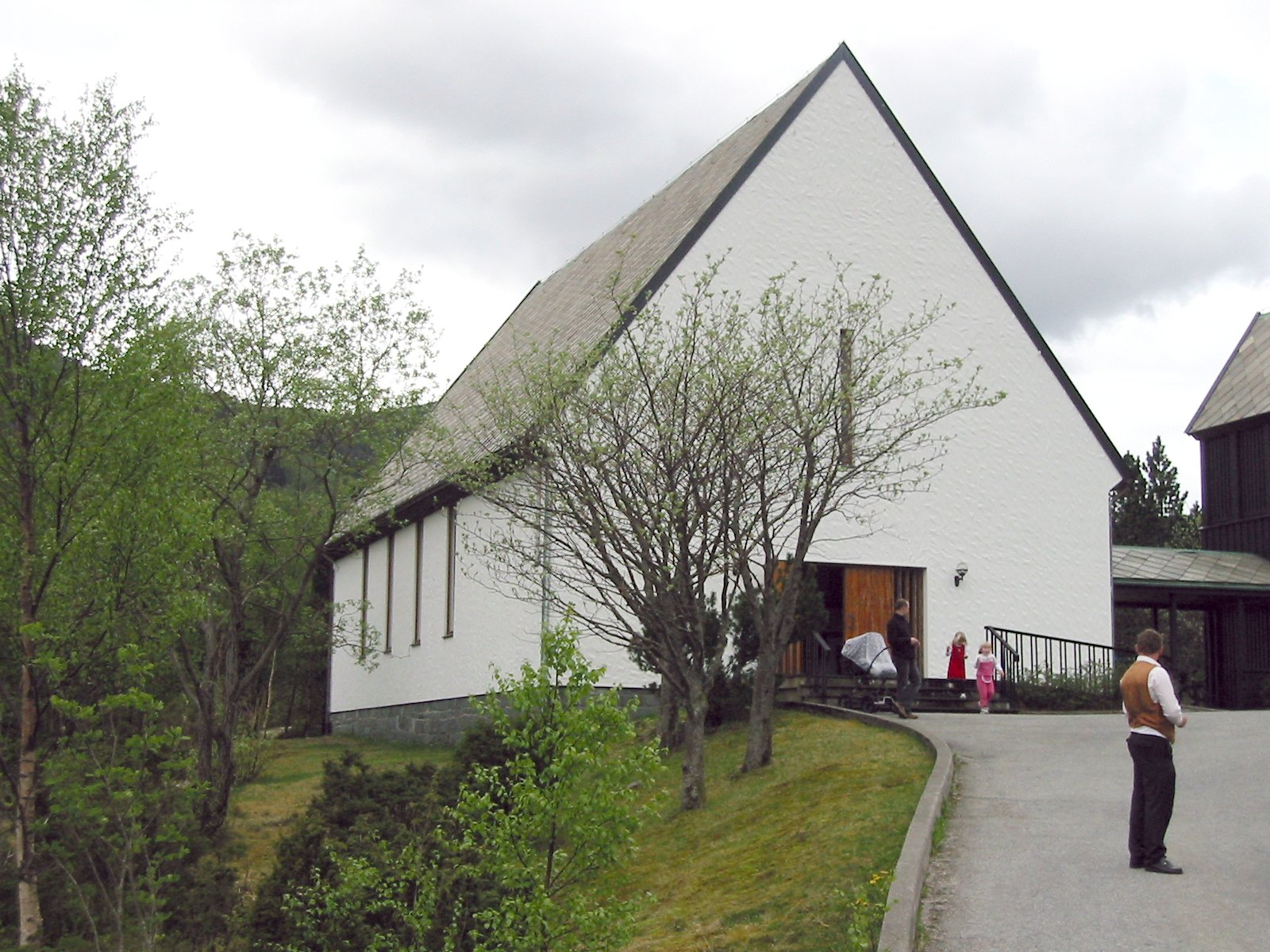
View of the chapel

Svelgen is the municipal center in Bremanger Municipality. It is an industrial site that grew up during the 20th century and it does not have any church history. The first church built in Svelgen was in 1960. Before this time, residents were part of the Midtgulen Church parish. The new chapel was designed by Johan Lindstrøm and his son Claus, who presumably completed the job after his father's death. The main contractor for the construction was G. and F. Hjelmeland. The chapel was consecrated on 9 October 1960 by Bishop Ragnvald Indrebø.

== See also ==
- List of churches in Bjørgvin
