= Sørgulen =

Fjord in Vestland, Norway

- Interactive map of the fjord
- Location: Vestland county, Norway
- Coordinates: 61.72268°N 5.10839°E
- Type: Fjord
- Primary outflows: Gulen fjord
- Basin countries: Norway
- Max. length: 5 kilometres (3.1 mi)

Sørgulen is a fjord in Bremanger Municipality in Vestland county, Norway. It is a branch southwards off the main Gulen fjord. The length of the fjord is about 5 kilometres (3.1 mi). The fjord is the southwestern of the three branches of the larger Gulen fjord; the other two are Nordgulen and Midtgulen.
