= Midtgulen =

Fjord in Vestland, Norway

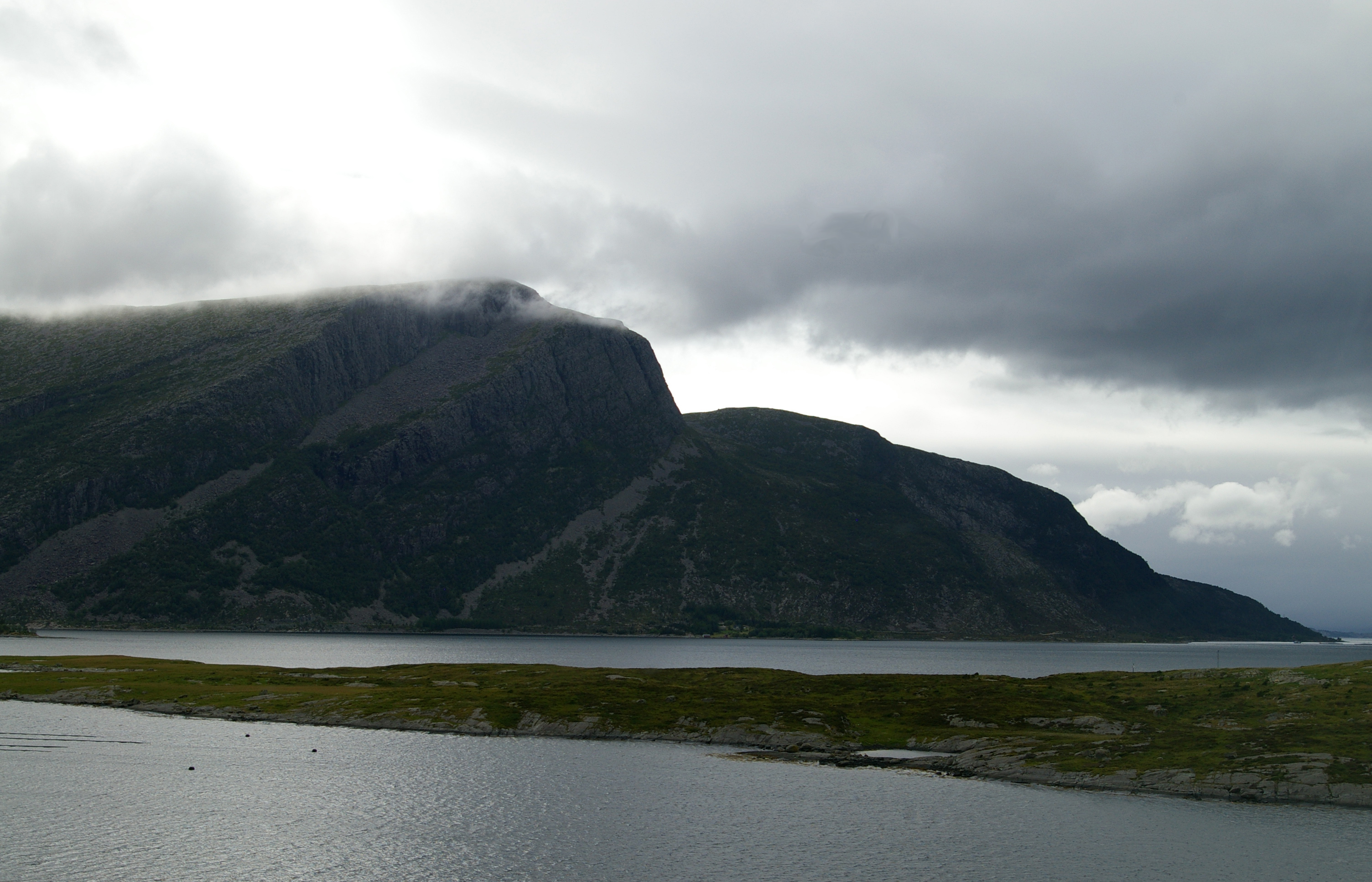
- View of the fjord
- Interactive map of the fjord
- Location: Vestland county, Norway
- Coordinates: 61.73126°N 5.17195°E
- Type: Fjord
- Primary outflows: Gulen fjord
- Basin countries: Norway
- Max. length: 7 kilometres (4.3 mi)

Midtgulen is a fjord in Bremanger Municipality in Vestland county, Norway. It is a branch southwards off the main Gulen fjord. The length of the fjord is about 7 kilometres (4.3 mi). The fjord is the middle of the three branches of the Gulen fjord; the other two are Nordgulen and Sørgulen. The Midtgulen Church is located at the northeastern side of the mouth of the fjord.
