= Gulen (fjord) =

Fjord in Bremanger, Norway

- Gulen fjord
- Interactive map of the fjord
- Location: Vestland county, Norway
- Coordinates: 61.7695°N 5.2238°E
- Type: Fjord
- Primary inflows: Svelgen river
- Primary outflows: Frøysjøen
- Basin countries: Norway
- Max. length: 12 kilometres (7.5 mi)
- Max. width: 2.4 kilometres (1.5 mi)

Gulen is a fjord in Bremanger Municipality in Vestland county, Norway. The fjord empties into the Frøysjøen strait (on the west end) and to the east, it splits into three branches: Nordgulen, Midtgulen, and Sørgulen. The fjord is a maximum of 12 kilometres (7.5 mi) long (including the Nordgulen branch), terminating at the village of Svelgen in the east. The Svelgen river is one of the primary inflows of the fjord.

== See also ==
- List of Norwegian fjords
