= Kvanhovden Lighthouse =

Coastal lighthouse in Kinn, Norway

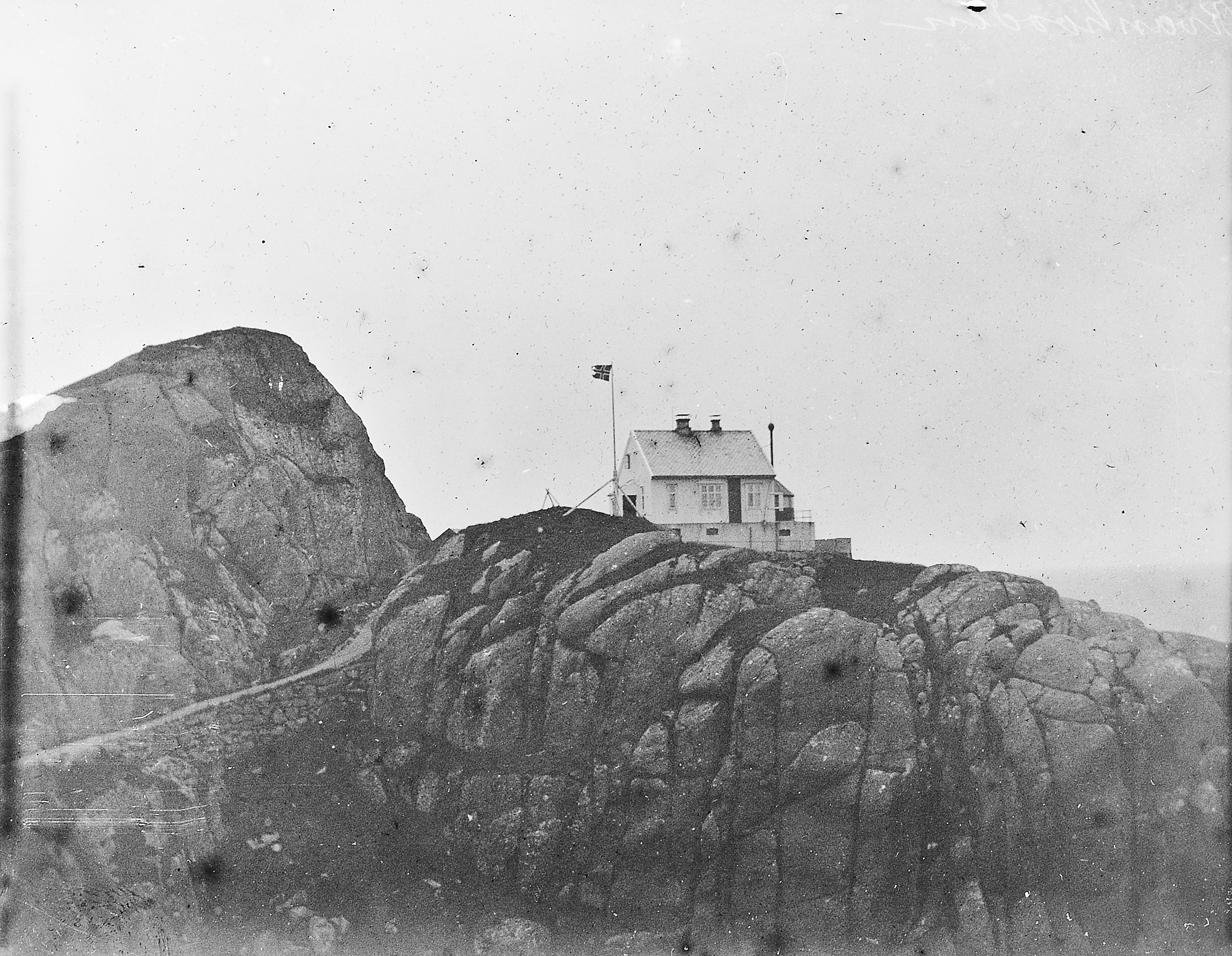
- Location: Kinn Municipality; Vestland county Norway
- Coordinates: 61°41′50″N 4°49′53″E

Tower
- Constructed: 1895
- Construction: wooden tower
- Automated: 1980
- Height: 10 m (33 ft)
- Shape: tower with lantern attached to keeper's house
- Markings: white keeper's house, red lantern

Light
- Focal height: 40 m (130 ft)
- Intensity: 126,000 candela
- Range: 17.7 nmi (32.8 km; 20.4 mi)
- Characteristic: Oc WRG 6s

Kvanhovden Lighthouse (Norwegian: Kvanhovden fyr) is a coastal lighthouse located in Kinn Municipality in Vestland county, Norway. The lighthouse sits on the northwestern shore of the island of Hovden, at the southern entrance to the Frøysjøen strait.

== History ==
It was first built in 1895 and it was automated in 1980.

The red 10-metre (33 ft) tall wood tower is attached to the seaward end of a 1 1/2-story wood lighthouse keeper's house. The light sits at an elevation of about 40 metres (130 ft) above sea level. The occulting light emits a white, red, or green light (depending on direction) once every six seconds. The site is accessible by boat, but there are no road connections to the lighthouse from the rest of the island.

== See also ==
- Lighthouses in Norway
- List of lighthouses in Norway
