= Kalvåg =

Village in Bremanger Municipality, Norway

- Village
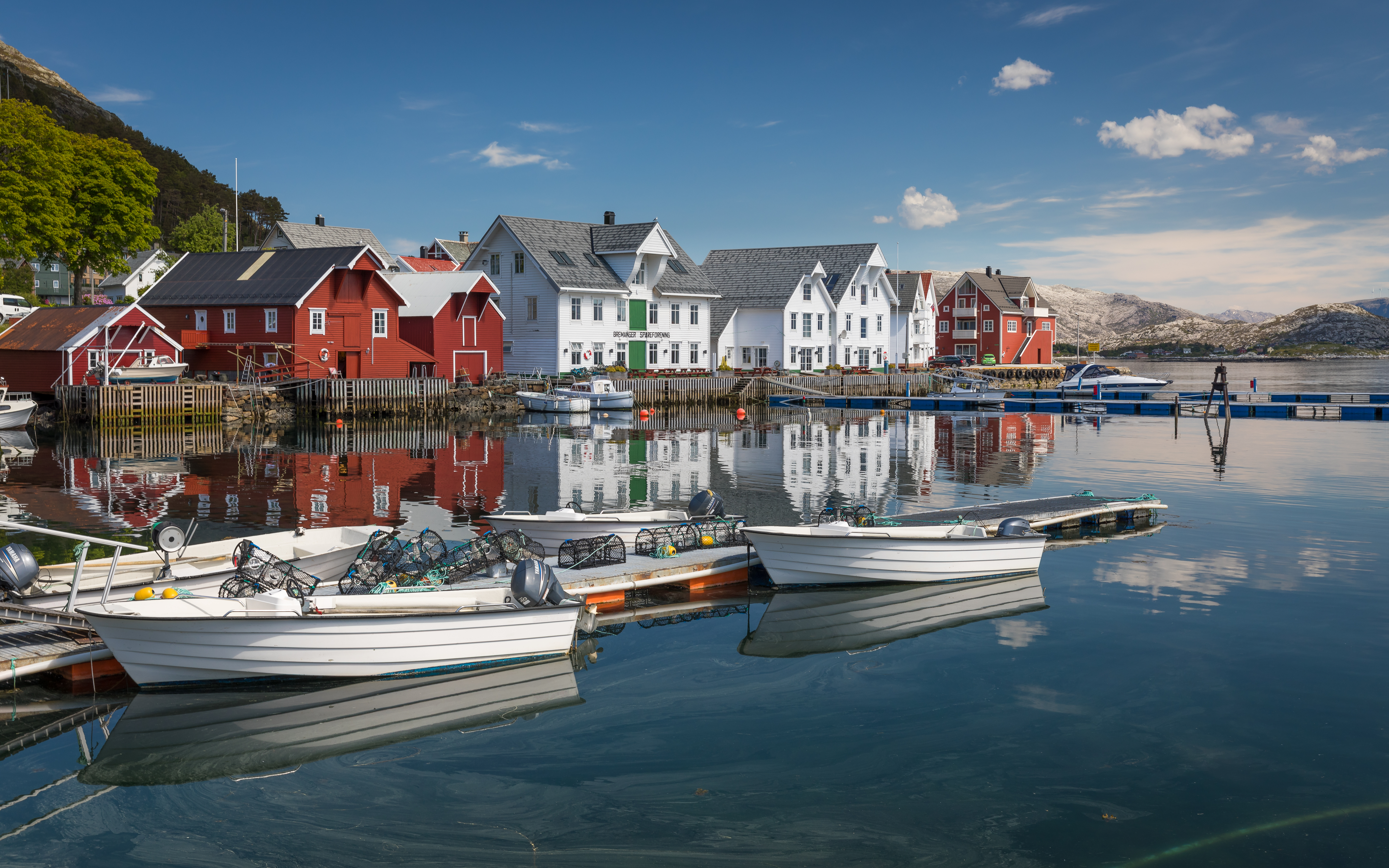
- Kalvåg harbour
- Interactive map of Kalvåg
- Location within Vestland Location within Norway
- Coordinates: 61.7663°N 4.8752°E
- Country: Norway
- Region: Western Norway
- County: Vestland
- District: Nordfjord
- Municipality: Bremanger Municipality

Area
  - Total: 0.42 km^{2} (0.16 sq mi)
- Elevation: 5 m (16 ft)

Population (2024)
  - Total: 401
  - Density: 955/km^{2} (2,470/sq mi)
- Time zone: UTC+01:00 (CET)
  - Summer (DST): UTC+02:00 (CEST)
- Post Code: 6729 Kalvåg

Kalvåg is a village in Bremanger Municipality in Vestland county, Norway. It is located on the southeast side of the island of Frøya on the coast along the Frøysjøen strait, the southern entrance to the Nordfjorden. There is a series of bridges that connect Kalvåg to the nearby island of Bremangerlandet (which is connected to the mainland via a tunnel and bridge).

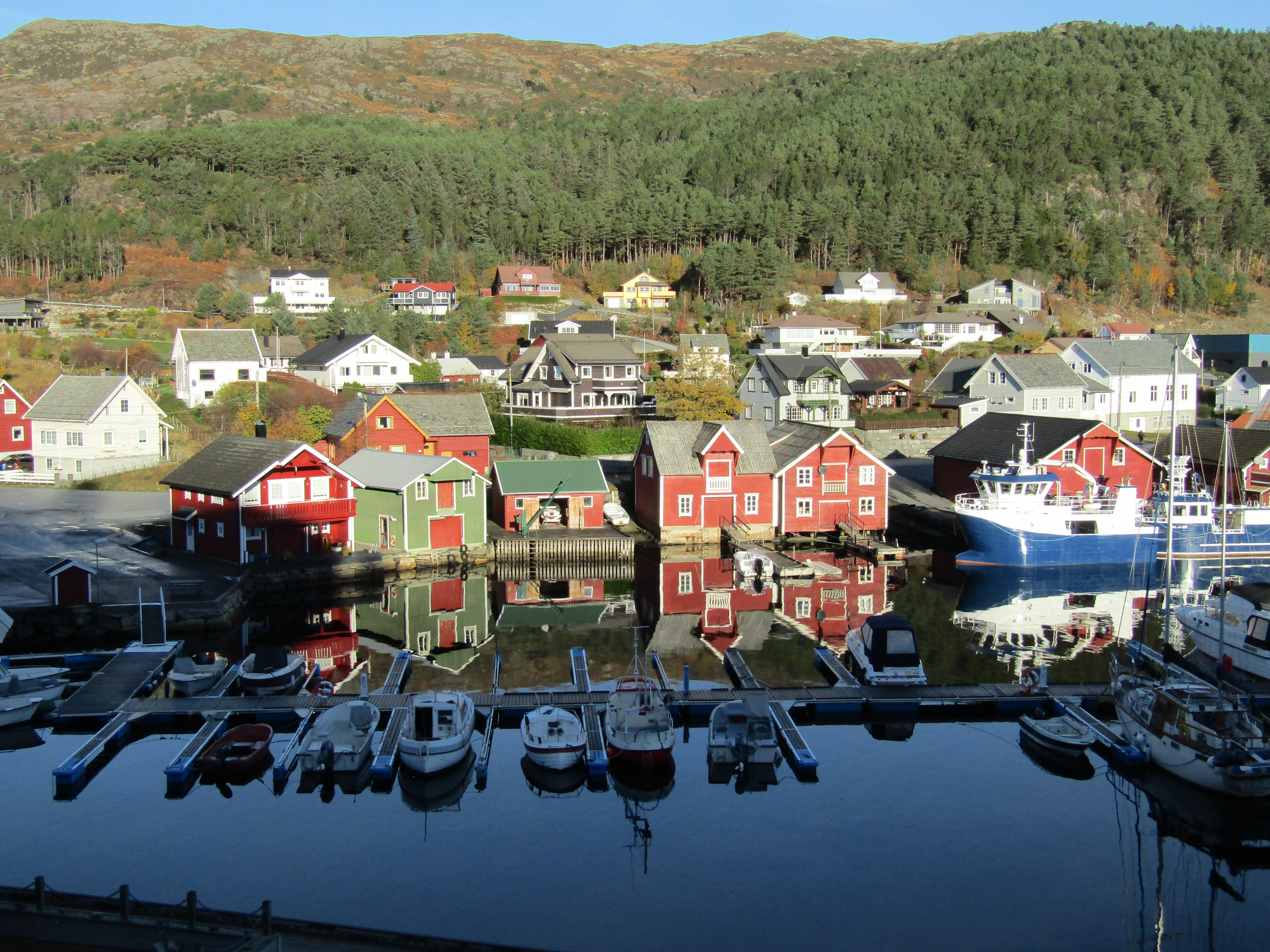
Kalvåg in 2023

The 0.42-square-kilometre (100-acre) village has a population (2024) of 401 and a population density of 955 inhabitants per square kilometre (2,470/sq mi).

The village of Kalvåg has a unique collection of old waterfront buildings, reputed to be the largest and best-kept waterfront environment in the county. Many of the old wharf buildings have been restored and converted to provide accommodation. The harbor is very good, with spacious public quays. Frøya Church is located about 1.5 kilometres (0.93 mi) northeast of the center of Kalvåg. There are some nearby tourist destinations such as Grotlesanden, the Hornelen cliff, rock carvings at Vingen, and the old trading stations of Rugsund and Smørhavn.

== History ==
The village of Kalvåg was the administrative centre of Bremanger Municipality from 1838 until 1964 when the municipality was enlarged and the administrative center was moved east to the mainland village of Svelgen.

=== Name ===
The first part of the name Kalvåg (previously spelled Kalvaag) comes from the verb kala which means "to make cold" or "to freeze". The second element is the genitive case of the Old Norse noin vágr which means "bay", therefore the name could be explained as a bay which often freezes in winter.

== Notable people ==
- Nikolai Astrup, born in Kalvåg in 1880
- Heidi Grande Røys, a member of Stoltenberg's Second Cabinet
- Oddvar Torsheim, a surrealist painter
