= Bremanger Church =

Church in Vestland, Norway

- Bremanger kyrkje
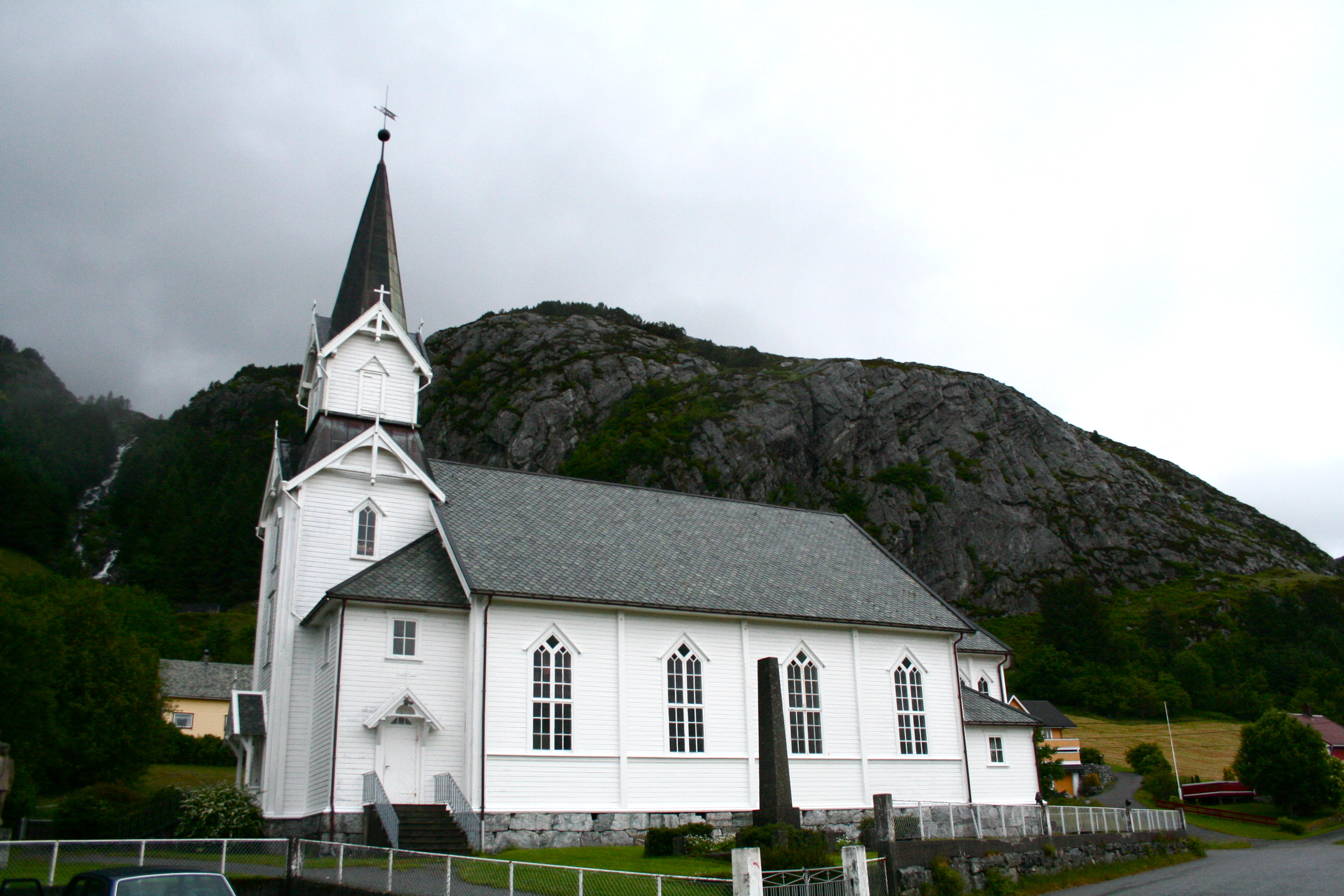
- View of the church
- Bremanger Church
- 61°50′36″N 4°58′00″E
- Location: Bremanger Municipality, Vestland
- Country: Norway
- Denomination: Church of Norway
- Churchmanship: Evangelical Lutheran
- Website: kyrkja.no/bremanger

History
- Former name: Bremangerpollen kapell
- Status: Parish church
- Founded: 13th century
- Consecrated: 4 September 1914

Architecture
- Functional status: Active
- Architect: Anders Karlsen
- Architectural type: Long church
- Completed: 1914 (112 years ago)

Specifications
- Capacity: 400
- Materials: Wood

Administration
- Diocese: Bjørgvin bispedømme
- Deanery: Nordfjord prosti
- Parish: Bremanger
- Norwegian Cultural Heritage Site
- Type: Church
- Status: Not protected
- ID: 83951

Bremanger Church (Norwegian: Bremanger kyrkje) is a parish church of the Church of Norway in Bremanger Municipality in Vestland county, Norway. It is located in the village of Bremanger on the island of Bremangerlandet. It is the church for the Bremanger parish which is part of the Nordfjord prosti (deanery) in the Diocese of Bjørgvin. The white, wooden church was built in a long church style in 1914 by the architect Anders Karlsen from Eid. The church seats about 400 people.

The church was originally called Bremangerpollen Chapel. The name was changed to Bremanger Church in 1952. The church is located at Hauge, in the innermost part of the Bremangerpollen bay. The church was consecrated on 4 September 1914 by the bishop Johan Willoch Erichsen.

== History ==
The earliest existing historical records of the church date back to 1330, but it was likely not new at that time. The first church in Bremanger was a wooden stave church tat was located at Grotle, on the southwest shore of the island of Bremangerlandet, about 3.5 kilometres (2.2 mi) west of the village of Bremanger. This church was likely first built during the 13th century. In 1652, the church was remodeled and expanded such that it then had a cruciform design. In 1695, the church was torn down and replaced by a new timber-framed building. This new church was built immediately west of the site of the old building. This building was in use until 1865, when the aging church at Grotle was torn down. At that time, it was decided to move the location of the Bremanger parish church from Grotle to the village of Kalvåg which was further to the south so that it would be more centrally located within the parish. The new Bremanger Church was completed in 1865.

The people living in the northern part of Bremangerlandet island were now without a nearby church of their own. The new Bremanger Church to the south, on the island of Frøya was nearly 10 kilometres (6.2 mi) to the south. The people who lived further north on the island complained that the journey to that church had become too long and strenuous. Going by boat from Bremangerlandet to Frøya was often a risky undertaking, which kept people from going to church. The people felt that if they got a church in their own village, many more people would get the opportunity to listen to the words of the Lord. These people, even the Vicar, had to eventually yield to such a strong argument, and so the work was started in the 1890s to erect a new annex chapel in the village of Hauge (now called Bremanger).

A new chapel was built at Hauge in 1908 and on 1 July 1908 the parish was divided into two, with all of the farms between Vetvik (in the north) and Nøtset (in the south) being transferred to the new Bremangerpollen parish. A few days after the establishment of the new parish, the new "bedehus" (chapel) was consecrated at Hauge for church functions. From the village of Vetvik the journey to church was still more than long enough, and for those who chose not to go by boat, the alternative was a three-hour hike across the mountain. The new chapel was very small and was not in use for very long.

A new, larger chapel, known as Bremangerpollen Chapel was completed in 1914 to replace the little chapel that was originally used from 1908 until 1914. This new building was designed by Anders Karlsen from Eid, and the lead builder was Jørgen Myroldhaug. The new church was consecrated on 4 September 1914. The stones for the foundation wall were taken from the mountain straight up from the church site. This work was carried out on a voluntary basis by the villagers themselves, in addition to the transportation of the wooden building material. In 1952, the chapel was renamed as Bremanger Church. In 1964, electric heating was installed in the building.

== See also ==
- List of churches in Bjørgvin
