= Askvoll Church =

Church in Vestland, Norway

- Askvoll kyrkje
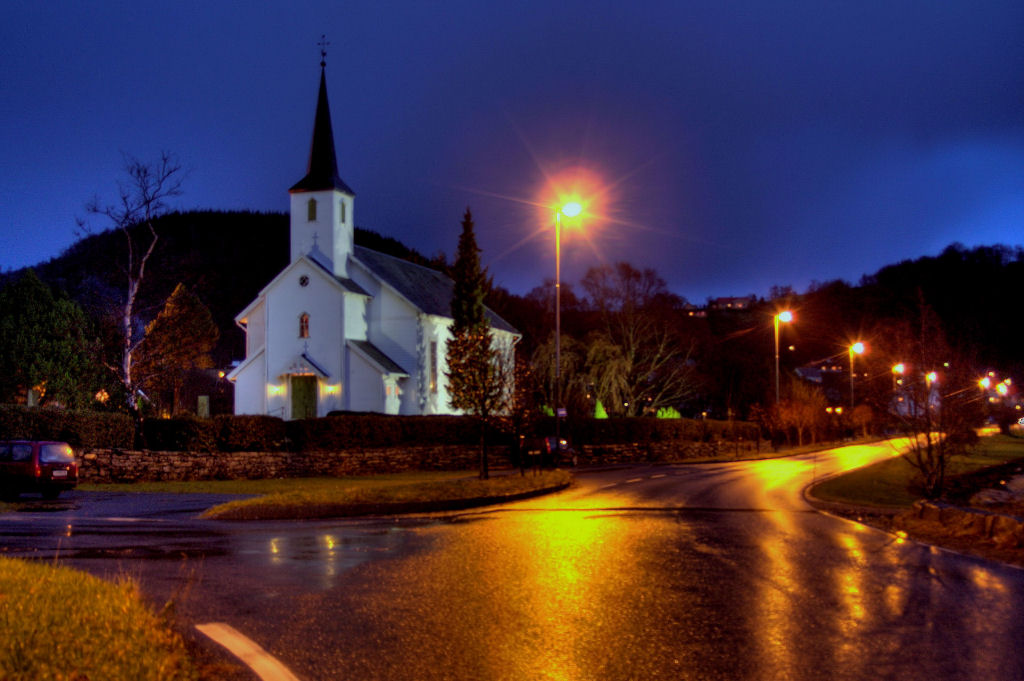
- View of the church
- Askvoll Church
- 61°20′53″N 5°04′12″E
- Location: Askvoll Municipality, Vestland
- Country: Norway
- Denomination: Church of Norway
- Churchmanship: Evangelical Lutheran

History
- Status: Parish church
- Founded: 13th century
- Consecrated: 13 December 1863

Architecture
- Functional status: Active
- Architect: Anders Askevold
- Architectural type: Long church
- Completed: 1863 (163 years ago)

Specifications
- Capacity: 425
- Materials: Wood

Administration
- Diocese: Bjørgvin bispedømme
- Deanery: Sunnfjord prosti
- Parish: Askvoll
- Norwegian Cultural Heritage Site
- Type: Church
- Status: Not protected
- ID: 83802

Askvoll Church (Norwegian: Askvoll kyrkje) is a parish church of the Church of Norway in Askvoll Municipality in Vestland county, Norway. It is located in the village of Askvoll. It is one of several churches for the Askvoll parish which is part of the Sunnfjord prosti (deanery) in the Diocese of Bjørgvin. The white, wooden church was built in a long church style in 1863 using plans drawn up by Anders Askevold. The church seats about 425 people.

== History ==
The earliest existing historical records of the church date back to the year 1306, but the church was not new at that time. The first church was a wooden stave church that was locate on the same site as the present church. In 1604, the old medieval church was torn down and replaced with a new timber-framed long church on the same site. The new building had a nave that measured about 17 by 9 metres (56 ft × 30 ft) and a choir that measured about 5 by 6 metres (16 ft × 20 ft). The old church porch and tower above it from the medieval stave church were saved and reused in the new building. In 1709, the nave was enlarged by adding a transept to the north, creating a half-cruciform design for the church.

In 1814, this church served as an election church (Norwegian: valgkirke). Together with more than 300 other parish churches across Norway, it was a polling station for elections to the 1814 Norwegian Constituent Assembly which wrote the Constitution of Norway. This was Norway's first national elections. Each church parish was a constituency that elected people called "electors" who later met together in each county to elect the representatives for the assembly that was to meet at Eidsvoll Manor later that year.

In 1859, the church was torn down and a new church was completed on the same site in 1860. The new building was a wooden cruciform church that was designed by the architect Jacob Wilhelm Nordan. This new church was struck by lightning and burned down in 1862, less than three years after it was built. After the fire, a new church was built in 1863 on the same site. This new church was designed by Anders Askevold and the lead builder was Ole Syslak. The new building was consecrated on 13 December 1863 by the local Provost Johan Carl Christie.

=== Steeple ===
The present church was built in 1863 and public opinion about its look was not particularly positive. In his "Remembrance protocol" the pastor, Bernt Askevold, put it like this: "The new church was built with a simple steeple which rose only a few feet above the roof ridge and with a big wooden cross at the other end of the ridge. But people have never liked the simple shape of the church steeple."

The main objection of the critics, then, was that the wooden cross was meant to serve as a steeple on the church, and, after some 30 years, in 1896, it was replaced by a "proper" steeple. This new steeple was much higher and pointed, and people thought this gave the whole building a somewhat prouder character. The artist Anders Askevold from Askvoll had designed the church with the steeple that people objected so much to. The new steeple was erected based on the design by the master builder P. Gabrielsen, but Askevold was asked for advice beforehand. The latter then made some suggestions what should be done. They used Dale Church in neighboring Fjaler Municipality as a model for the new steeple. This new steeple eventually put an end to the complaints concerning the look of the church building.

== Media gallery ==
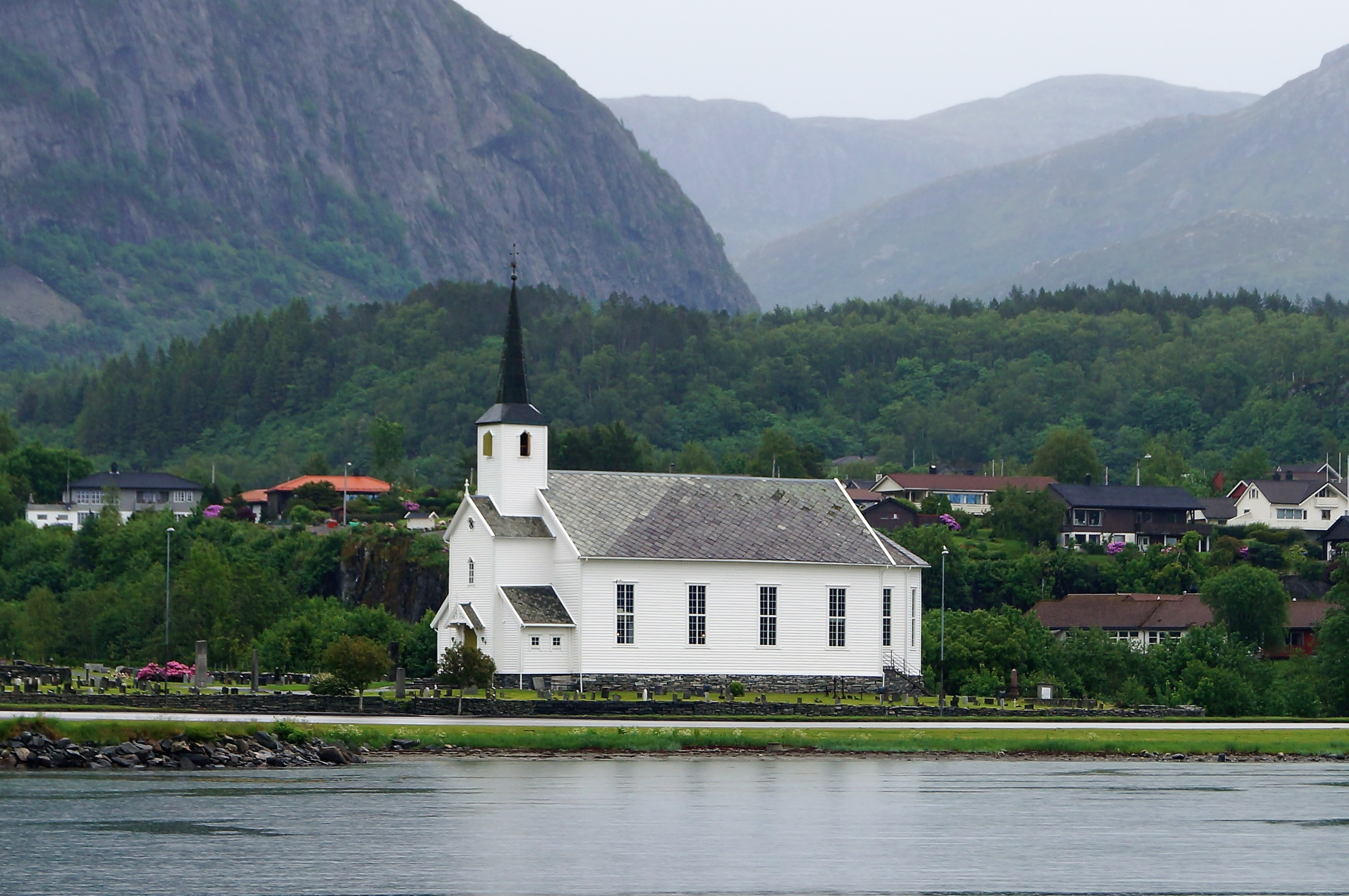

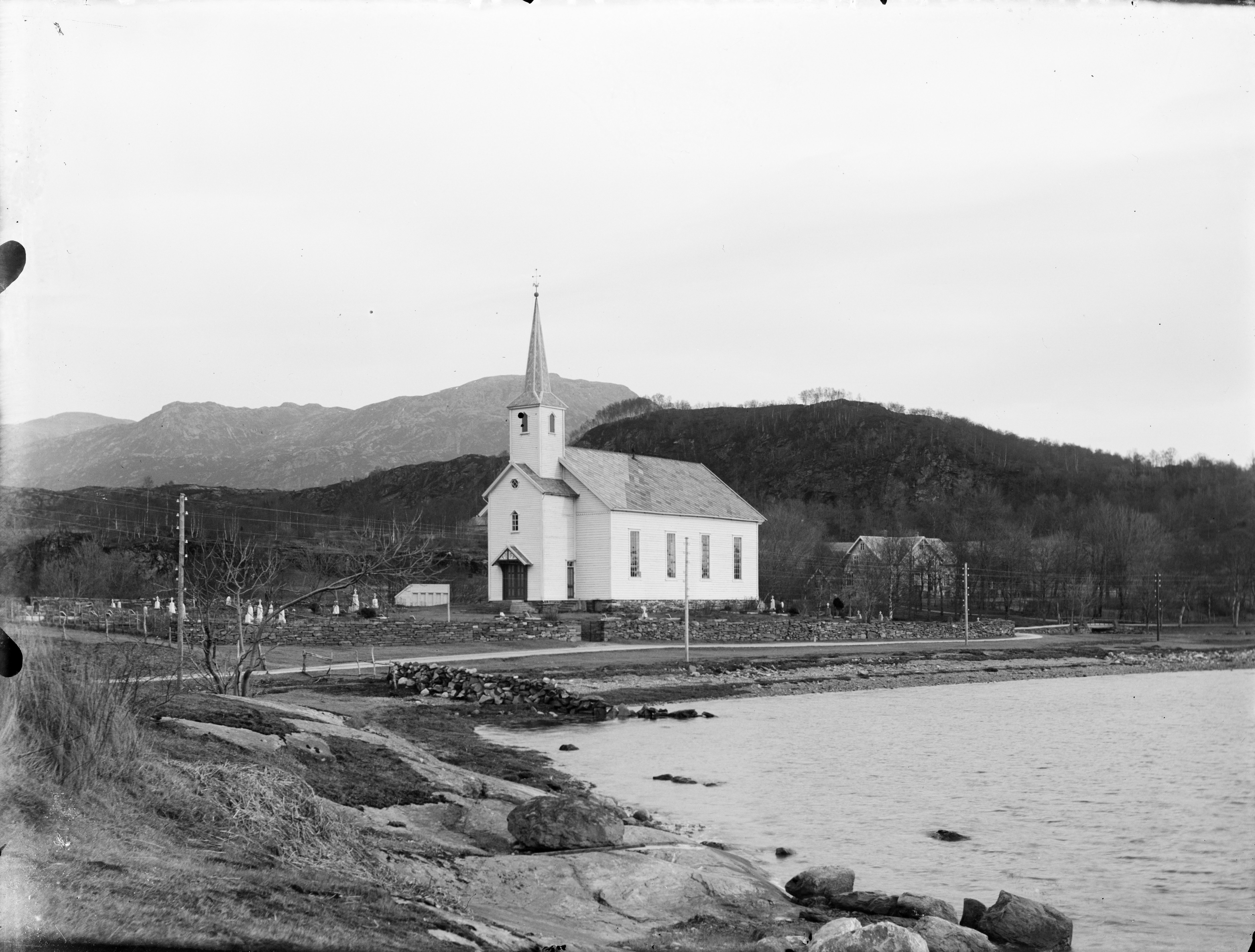

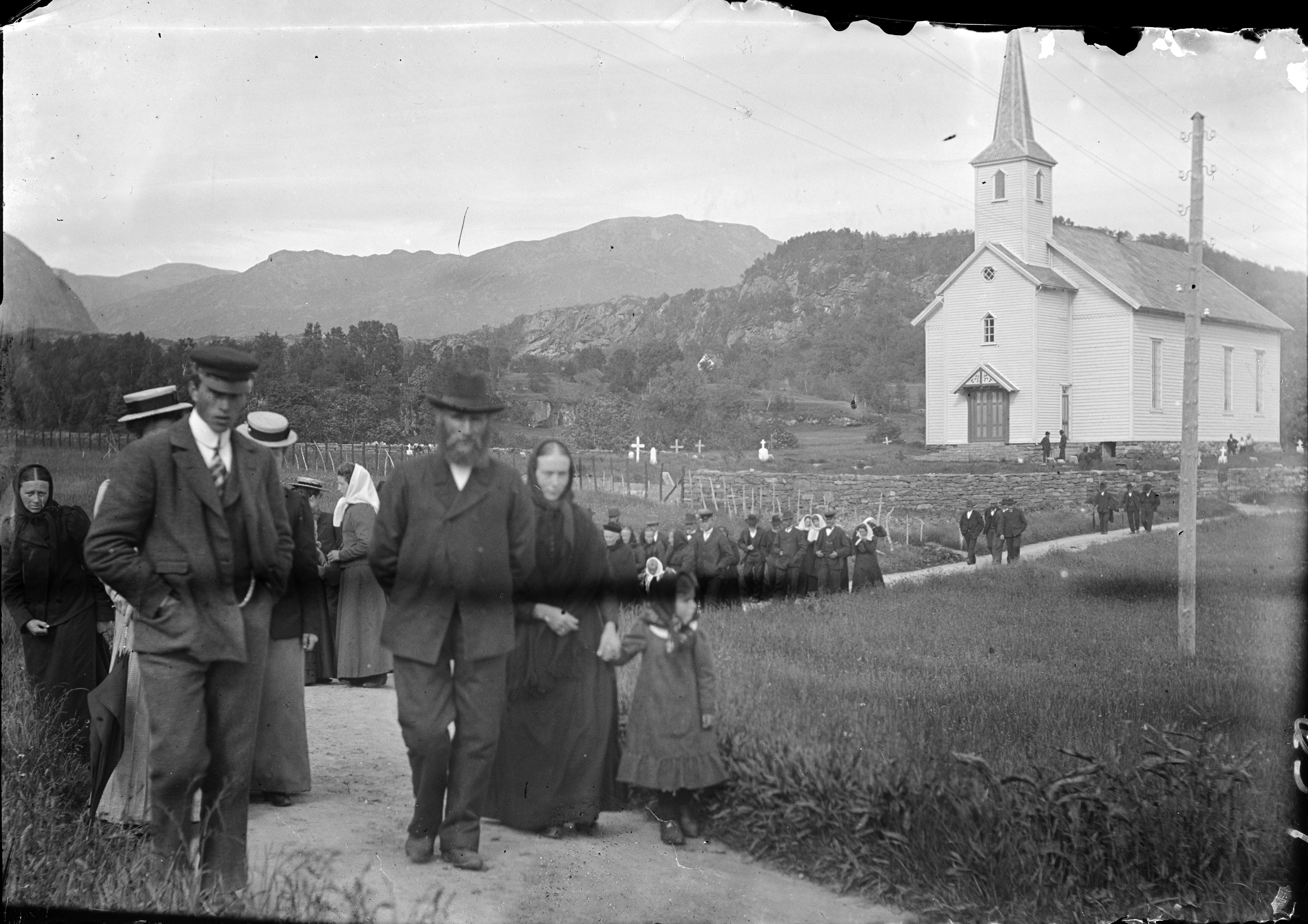

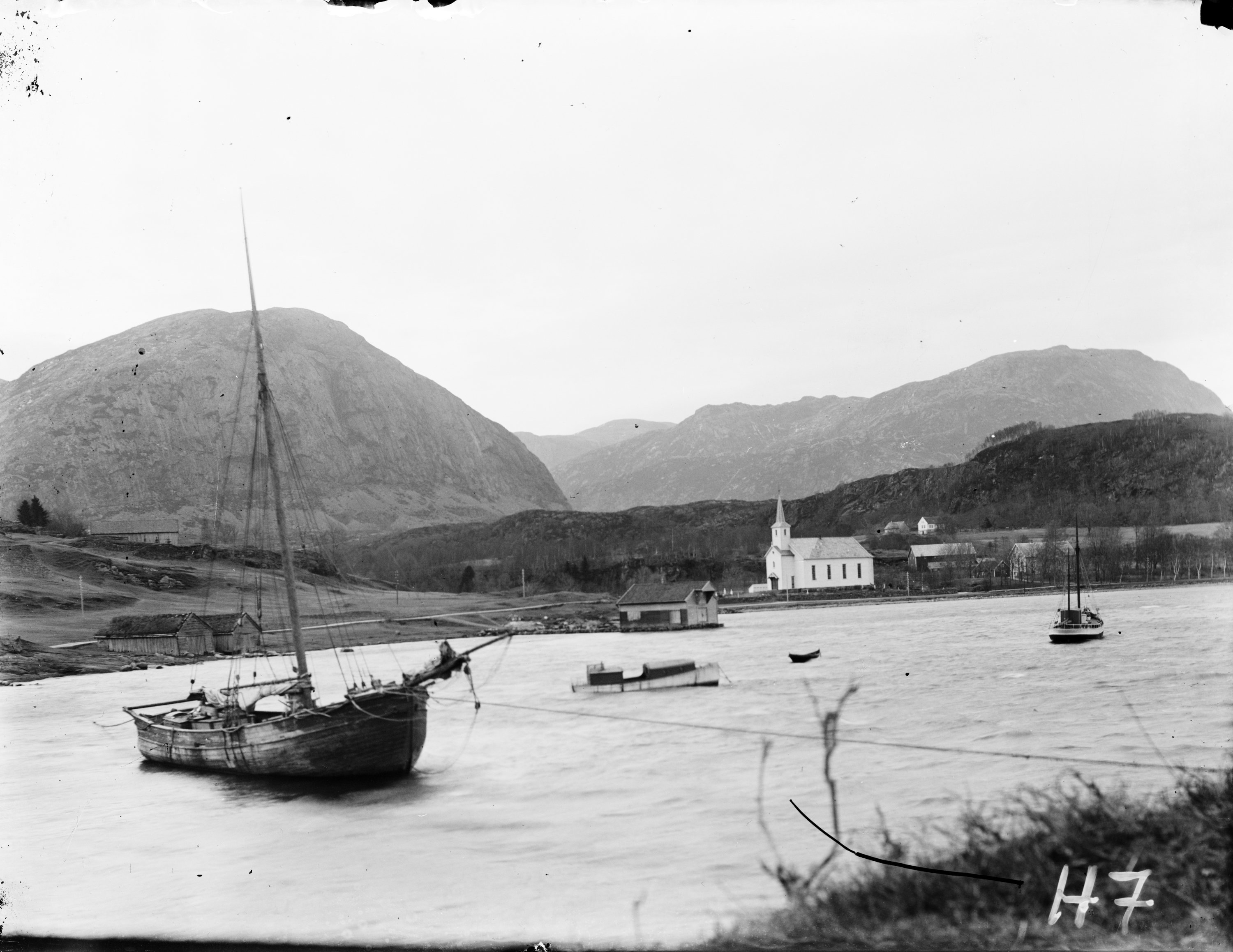

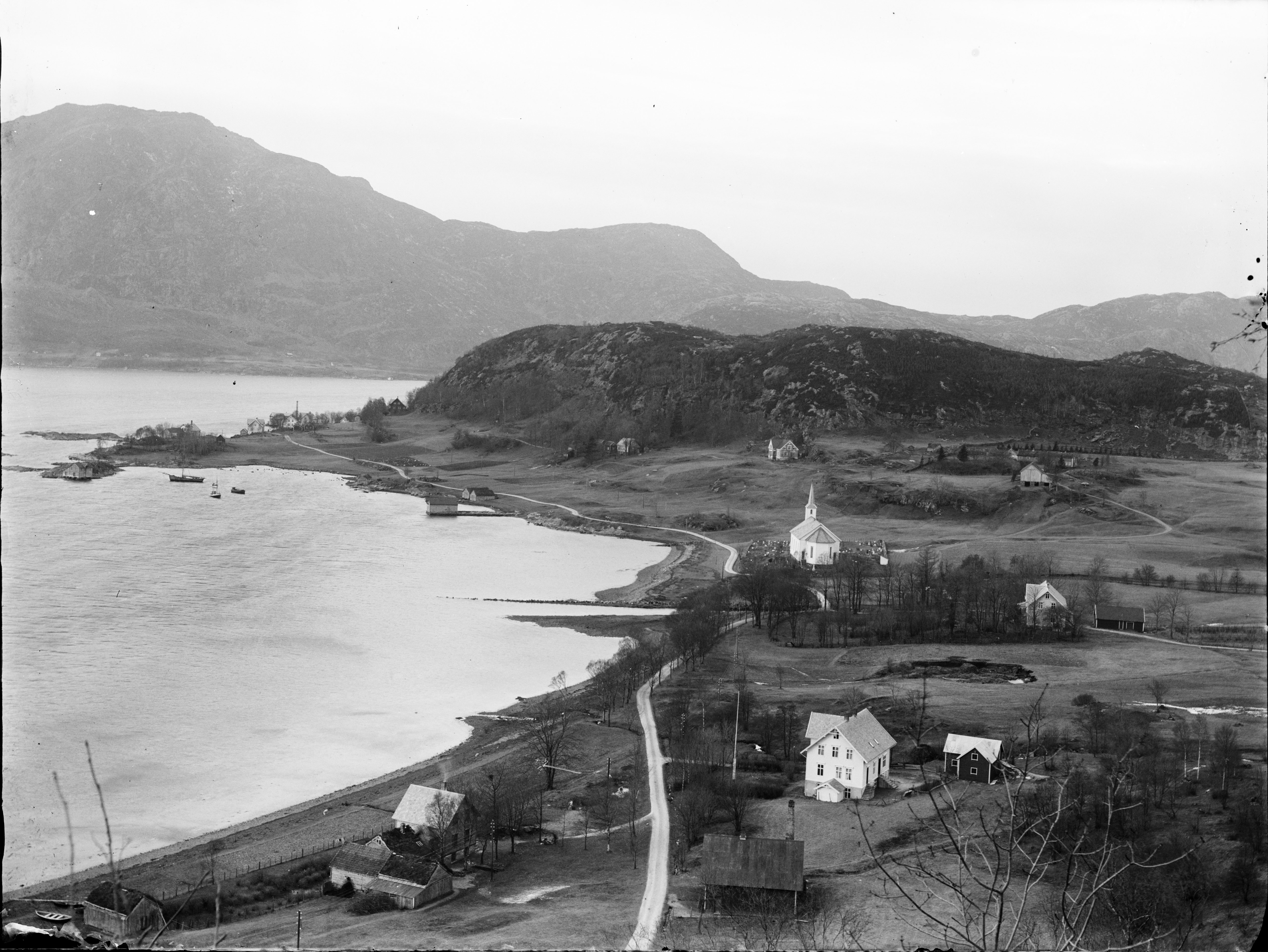

== See also ==
- List of churches in Bjørgvin
