= Svelgselva =

River in Vestland, Norway

Svelgselva Svelgen (unofficial)

Location
- Country: Norway
- County: Vestland
- Municipalities: Bremanger Municipality

Physical characteristics
- Source: Hjelmevatnet lake
  - location: Bremanger Municipality, Norway
  - coordinates: 61.7890°N 5.38716°E
  - elevation: 496 metres (1,627 ft)
- Mouth: Nordgulen fjord
  - location: Bremanger Municipality, Norway
  - coordinates: 61.77085°N 5.29532°E
  - elevation: 0 metres (0 ft)
- Length: 7.5 km (4.7 mi)

Svelgselva is a river in Bremanger Municipality in Vestland county, Norway. The river originates from the lake Hjelmevatnet, and empties into the Nordgulen fjord at the village of Svelgen.

== Power generation ==
The river is regulated for exploitation of its hydropower. The four Svelgen Hydroelectric Power Stations, which exploit the river and its neighbouring water systems, have a combined installed capacity of 107 megawatts (143,000 hp).

== See also ==
- List of rivers in Norway
