= Anders Askevold =

Norwegian painter (1834–1900)

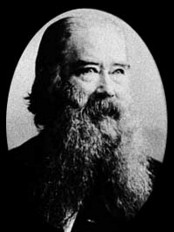
- Born: 25 December 1834; Askvoll, Sunnfjord
- Died: 22 October 1900 (aged 65); Düsseldorf, Germany

Anders Askevold (25 December 1834 – 22 October 1900) was a Norwegian painter. His art was characterized by romantic national expression. He was best known for his fjord landscapes from Western Norway.

== Biography ==
Anders Monsen Askevold was born at Askvoll in Sunnfjord, Norway. He was the second oldest of ten siblings. His father, Mons Andersson Askevold 1806-1889), was a teacher and member of parliament. His early training started at the age of thirteen in Bergen under landscape painter Hans Leganger Reuch (1800-1854). He was educated as a painter in Düsseldorf, but continued his studies in Paris and Munich. Askevold came to Düsseldorf in 1855 and stayed for 3 years. He trained in Düsseldorf under Hans Gude from 1855 until 1859. Askevold did some commissions for several altarpieces in Norway including the Askvoll Church in 1859.

He was known as a member of the Düsseldorf school of painting with others like Adelsteen Normann. From 1861 to 1866 he was in Paris. In 1866 Askevold moved back to Norway and settled in Bergen. After this he moved back to Düsseldorf where he would spend his winters in Germany and his summers in Norway.

His paintings were shown at numerous international exhibitions, including world exhibitions in London (1862), Paris (1867) and (1878), Vienna (1873) and Philadelphia (1876). In Vienna and Philadelphia, he was honored with medals. In 1884, in London he won the gold medal.

Askevold died in 1900 in Düsseldorf. A monument was erected in his honor by the municipality of Askvoll during 1934. Both the National Museum of Art, Architecture and Design in Oslo and Bergen Billedgalleri have notable collections of his art. A painting by Askevold sold for over £5,000 in 2009.

== Gallery ==
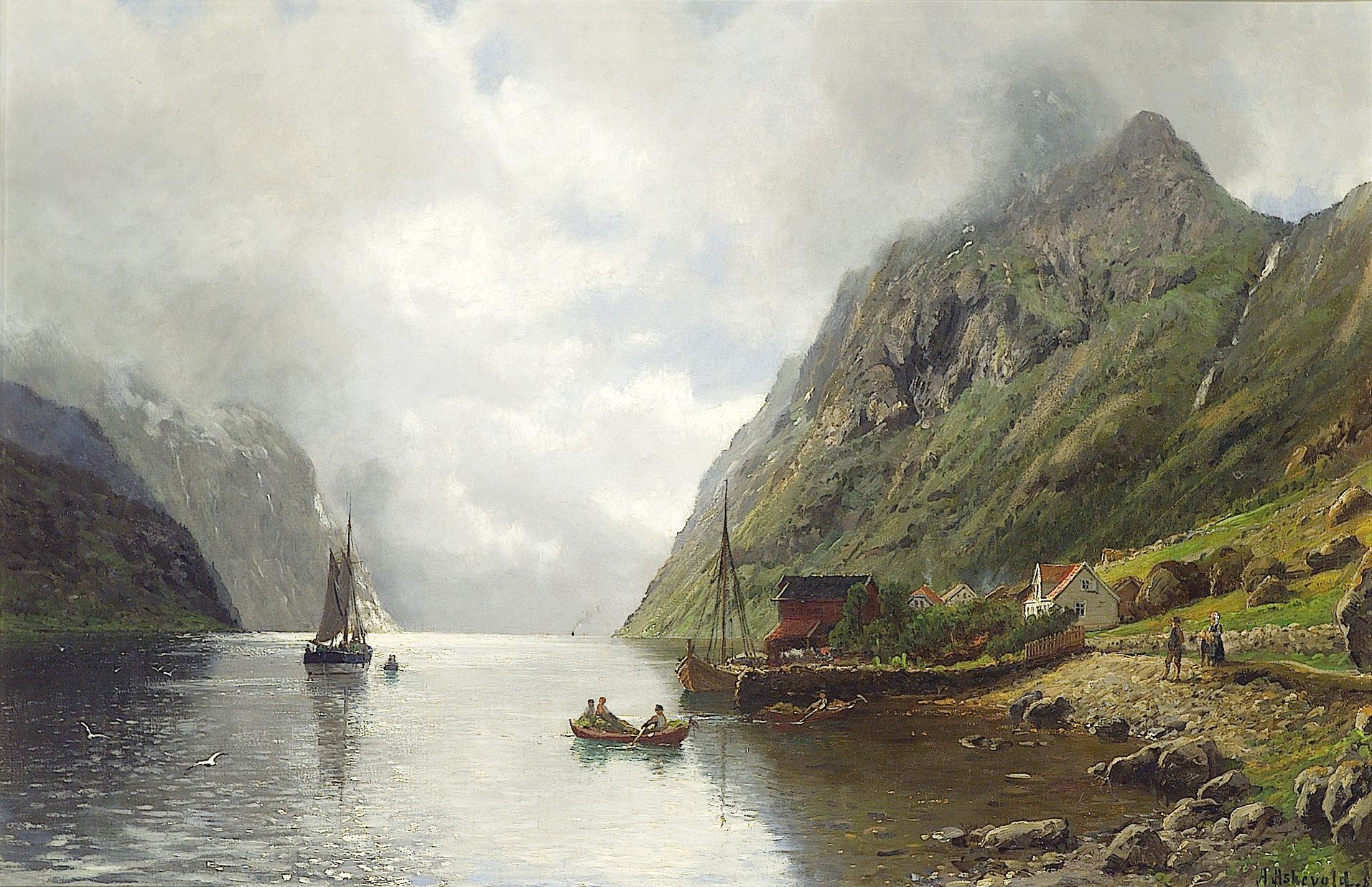
Norwegian Fjord Landscape
(probably 1889)

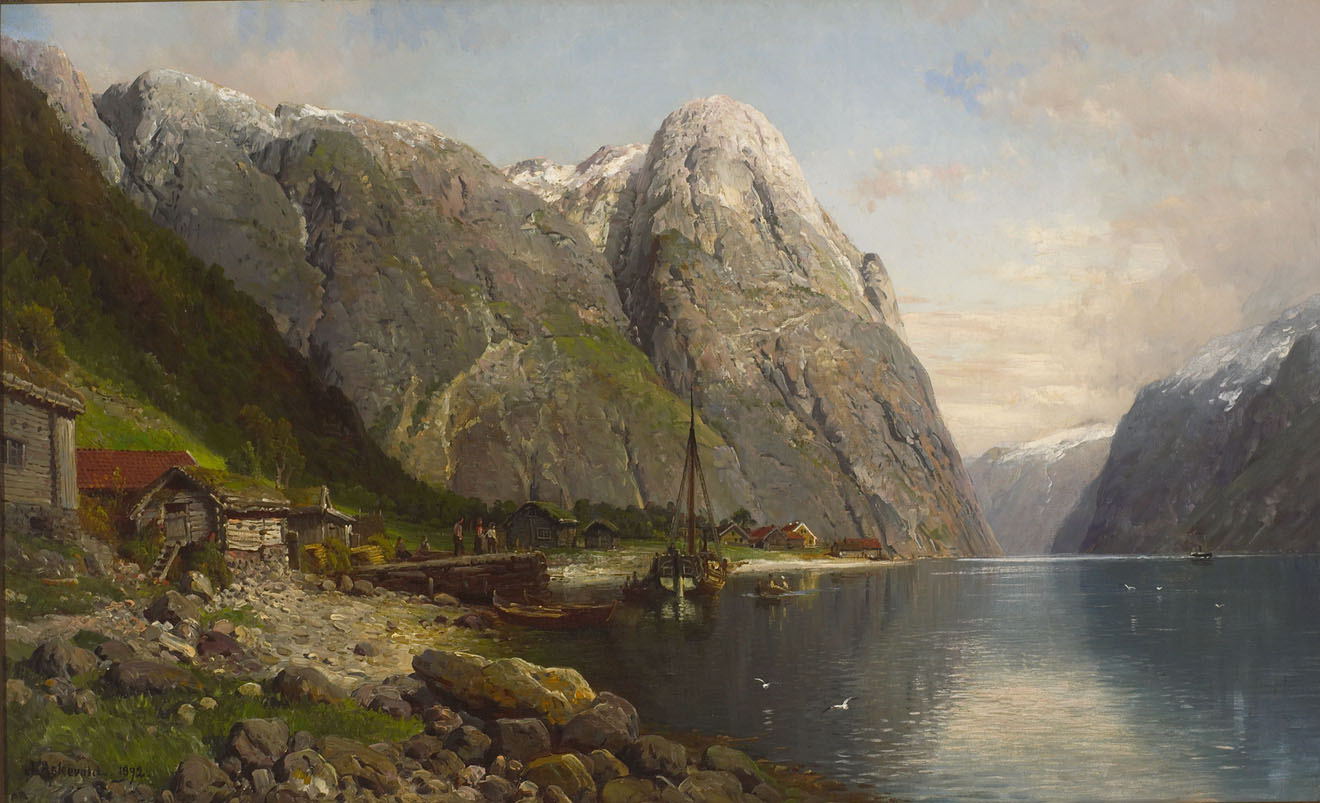
Bakka at Nærøyfjord (1892)

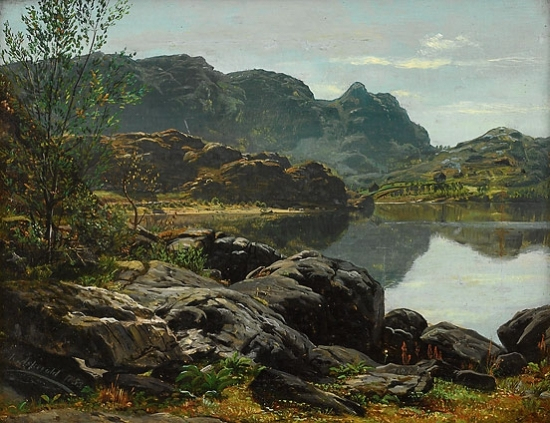
Landscape with Lake (1853)

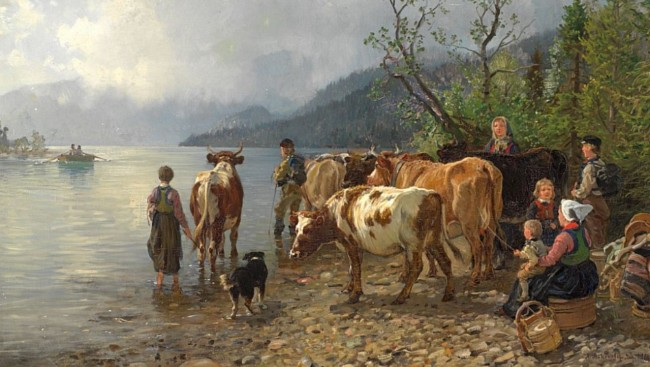
Scene with Cows
(before 1900)

== Other sources ==
- Warberg, Thor (2013) Anders Askevold, vestlandsmålaren (Selja forl.) ISBN 9788282400688

== Related reading ==
- Malmanger, Magne (1988) One Hundred Years of Norwegian Painting (Nasjonalgalleriet) ISBN 978-8290744064
