= Svelgen =

Village in Bremanger Municipality, Norway

- Village
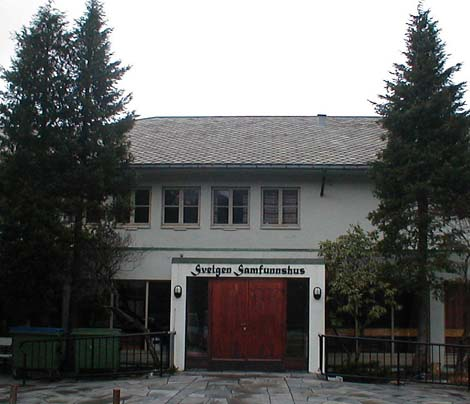
- Interactive map of Svelgen
- Location within Vestland Location within Norway
- Coordinates: 61.7698°N 5.2954°E
- Country: Norway
- Region: Western Norway
- County: Vestland
- District: Nordfjord
- Municipality: Bremanger Municipality

Area
  - Total: 1 km^{2} (0.39 sq mi)
- Elevation: 2 m (6.6 ft)

Population (2024)
  - Total: 1,106
  - Density: 1,106/km^{2} (2,860/sq mi)
- Time zone: UTC+01:00 (CET)
  - Summer (DST): UTC+02:00 (CEST)
- Post Code: 6723 Svelgen

Svelgen is the administrative centre of Bremanger Municipality in Vestland county, Norway. The village is located at the eastern end of the Nordgulen fjord and at the mouth of the Svelgselva river. The Bortne Tunnel is located about 8 kilometres (5.0 mi) north of the village, connecting it to the northern parts of the municipality. Svelgen Chapel is the local church—part of the national Church of Norway.

The 1-square-kilometre (250-acre) village has a population (2024) of 1,106 and a population density of 1,106 inhabitants per square kilometre (2,860/sq mi).

== History ==
Prior to 1912, the area had no name, other than calling it the end of the Nordgulen fjord or by some of the three local farms. In 1912, the village area was named Svelgen, after the nearby river Svelgselva. Since 1917, a large smelting plant in Svelgen has been a cornerstone business for the village. The plant is currently owned by Elkem. In 1964, when Bremanger Municipality was enlarged, the administrative centre was moved to Svelgen from Kalvåg.
