= Bremanger dam sabotage =

2025 cyberattack on a Norwegian dam

The Bremanger dam sabotage happened on 7 April 2025.

Russian hackers opened a flood gate that discharged 500 litres of water a second for four hours before the attack was detected and stopped. There were no injuries. Norwegian authorities are not sure which Russian cyber group is responsible. Without specifying, Ajit Niranjan writes that "the alleged perpetrators reportedly published a three-minute video, watermarked with the name of a pro-Russian cybercriminal group, on Telegram on the day of the attack."

In August 2025 Beate Gangås, head of the Norwegian Police Security Service, announced that her agency had noticed a change in behaviour of pro-Russian cyber attackers, citing the dam sabotage as one example: "The aim of this type of operation is to influence and to cause fear and chaos among the general population". The Russian embassy said the claims were "unfounded and politically motivated".
