= Hornelen =

Mountain in Bremanger, Norway

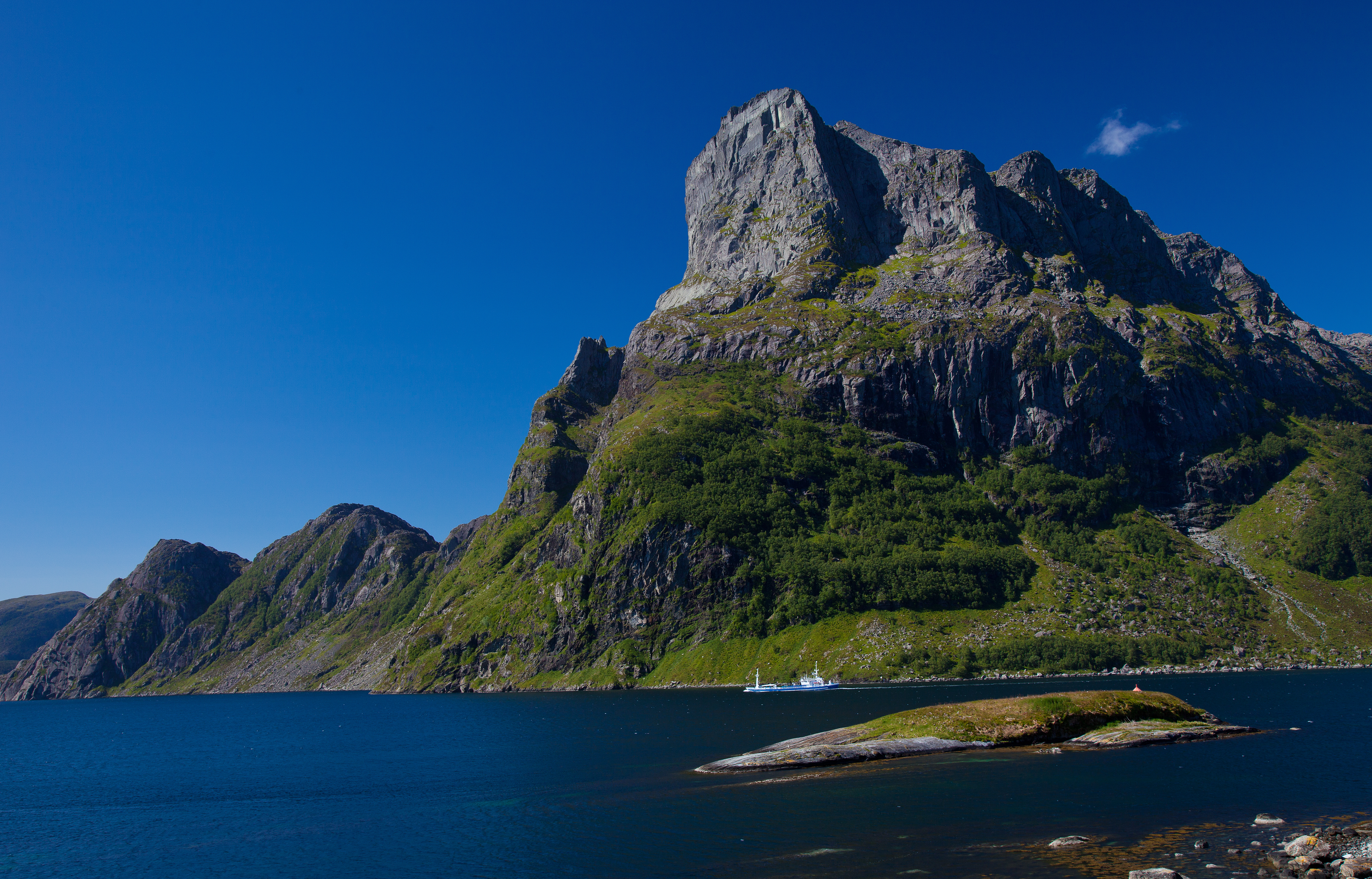
- Hornelen, looking southwest from Rugsundøya

Highest point
- Elevation: 860 m (2,820 ft)
- Prominence: 100 m (330 ft)
- Parent peak: Vestre Hornelen
- Isolation: 1.2 km (0.75 mi)
- Coordinates: 61°51′21″N 5°14′49″E

Geography
- Interactive map of the mountain
- Location: Vestland, Norway
- Topo map: 1118 I Måløy

Geology
- Rock age: Devonian
- Rock type: Sandstone

Climbing
- Easiest route: From Berleneset

Hornelen is a mountain in Bremanger Municipality in Vestland county, Norway. The mountain sits on the eastern end of the island of Bremangerlandet, along the Frøysjøen strait, in the Nordfjord region. At 860 metres (2,820 ft), it is the highest sea cliff in Europe (see illustration below), and has for a long time been used as a landmark for naval navigation.

Comparison of cliffs in Europe

The horizontal distance from the summit to the sea is approximately 500 metres (1,600 ft). Approximately 1 kilometre (0.62 mi) to the west of the cliffside is the highest point on the island Bremangerlandet, called Svartevassegga which has an elevation of 889 metres (2,917 ft). The rock in Hornelen consists of sandstone of Devonian age, and it constitutes an important part of the geology of Norway.

== Access and modern tourism ==
There are two possible routes to reach the summit. Both routes start from roughly sea level and can be initiated at either Berleneset or a parking lot at the cemetery at Hunskår. The easiest route follows a marked hiking trail that is roughly 7 km long and takes about four hours to reach the summit. The hiking season lasts from June to November.

The second and more demanding route to reach the summit follows a publicly funded via ferrata climbing route named Olavsrute, established in 2022. This route is graded F and can take up to 9 hours to complete. During the main season, a local guide can be hired to take one up the via ferrata. The route may also be climbed without a guide if one pays a maintenance fee.

Due to safety concerns, Bremanger Municipality has wanted to restrict access to the via ferrata so that it cannot be climbed without a hired guide. However, in 2024, the Vestland county governor ruled that the freedom to roam also applies to the Hornelen via ferrata routes and that they can be climbed by anyone, even without a guide.

== See also ==
- List of mountains of Norway
- Hornelen Basin
