= Bremanger (village) =

Village in Bremanger Municipality, Norway

- Village
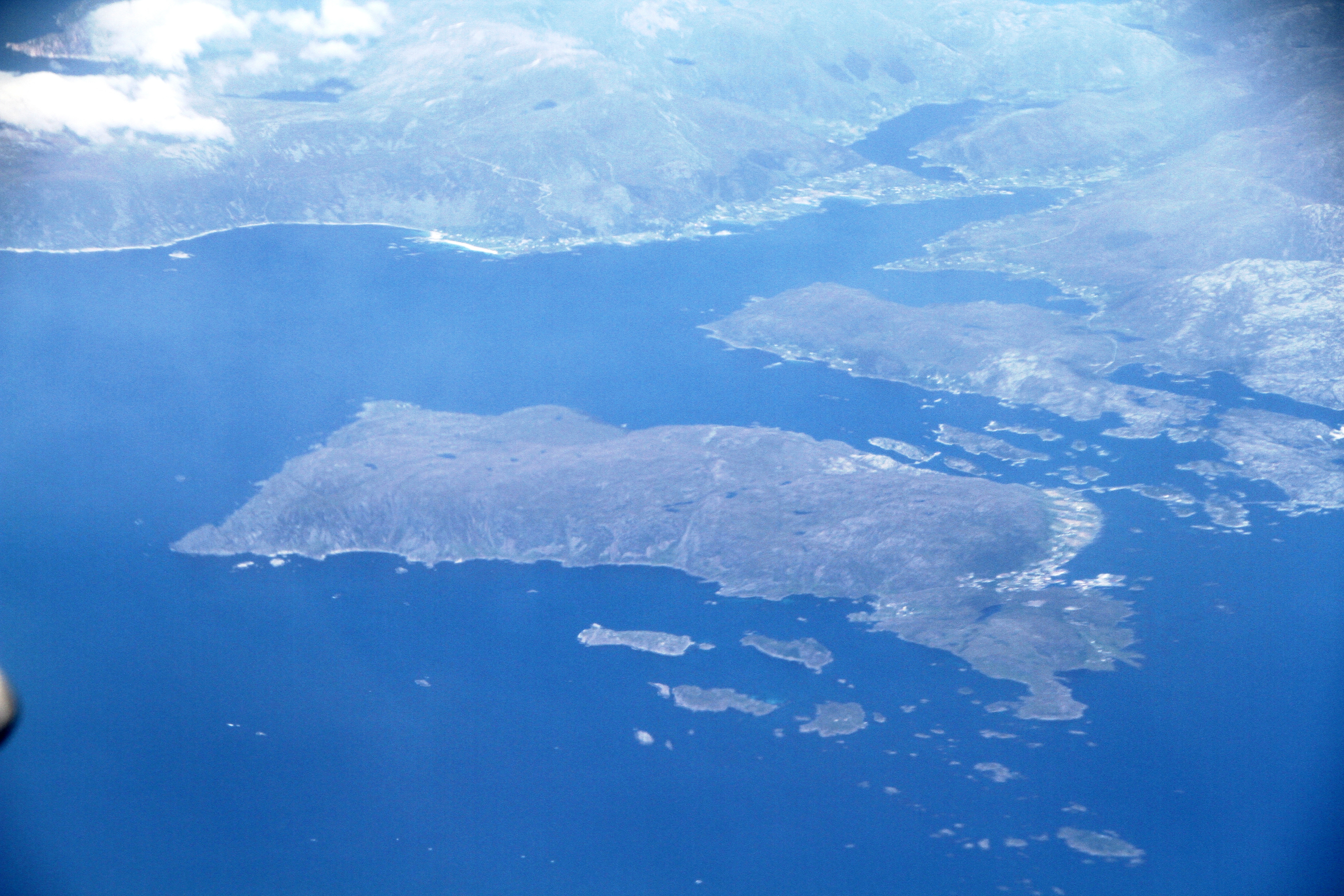
- View of the village (on the shoreline in the far background)
- Interactive map of Bremanger
- Location within Vestland Location within Norway
- Coordinates: 61.8397°N 4.9894°E
- Country: Norway
- Region: Western Norway
- County: Vestland
- District: Nordfjord
- Municipality: Bremanger Municipality

Area
  - Total: 0.61 km^{2} (0.24 sq mi)
- Elevation: 4 m (13 ft)

Population (2021)
  - Total: 367
  - Density: 602/km^{2} (1,560/sq mi)
- Time zone: UTC+01:00 (CET)
  - Summer (DST): UTC+02:00 (CEST)
- Post Code: 6727 Bremanger

Bremanger is a village in Bremanger Municipality in Vestland county, Norway. The village is located along the Bremangerpollen bay on the western side of the Bremangerlandet island. The 0.61-square-kilometre (150-acre) village had a population (2021) of 367 and a population density of 602 inhabitants per square kilometre (1,560/sq mi). Since 2021, the population and area data for this village area has not been separately tracked by Statistics Norway.

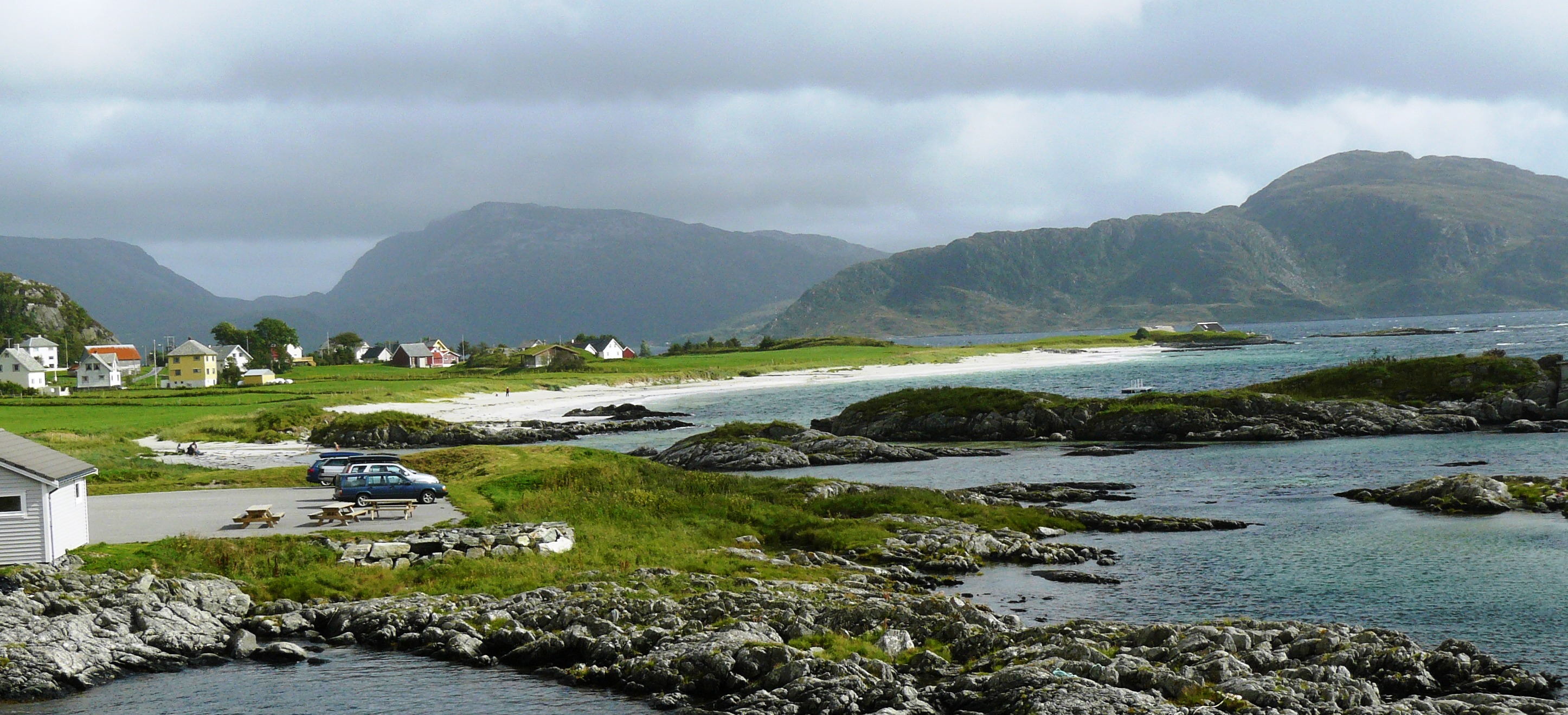
View of the Grotlesanden beach

The village sits along the shore with steep mountains on one side and the ocean on the other. The lake Dalevatnet sits on the north side of the village. Bremanger Church is located in the village, serving the western part of the island. The village has been home to a church since the Middle Ages. On the western end of the village lies the Grotlesanden beach area, a picturesque white sand beach.
