= Nordgulen =

Fjord in Vestland, Norway

- Interactive map of the fjord
- Location: Vestland county, Norway
- Coordinates: 61.7695°N 5.2238°E
- Type: Fjord
- Primary inflows: Svelgen river
- Primary outflows: Gulen fjord
- Basin countries: Norway
- Max. length: 9 kilometres (5.6 mi)
- Max. width: 1.8 kilometres (1.1 mi)
- Settlements: Svelgen

Nordgulen is a fjord in Bremanger Municipality in Vestland county, Norway. It is a branch off the main Gulen fjord. The length of the fjord is about 9 kilometres (5.6 mi). The river Svelgen is one of the primary inflows into the Nordgulen fjord. The village of Svelgen is located at the end of the Nordgulen fjord. There are settlements all around the fjord, and roads along the coast around the entire fjord.
