= Frøya, Bremanger =

Island in Vestland, Norway

Frøya
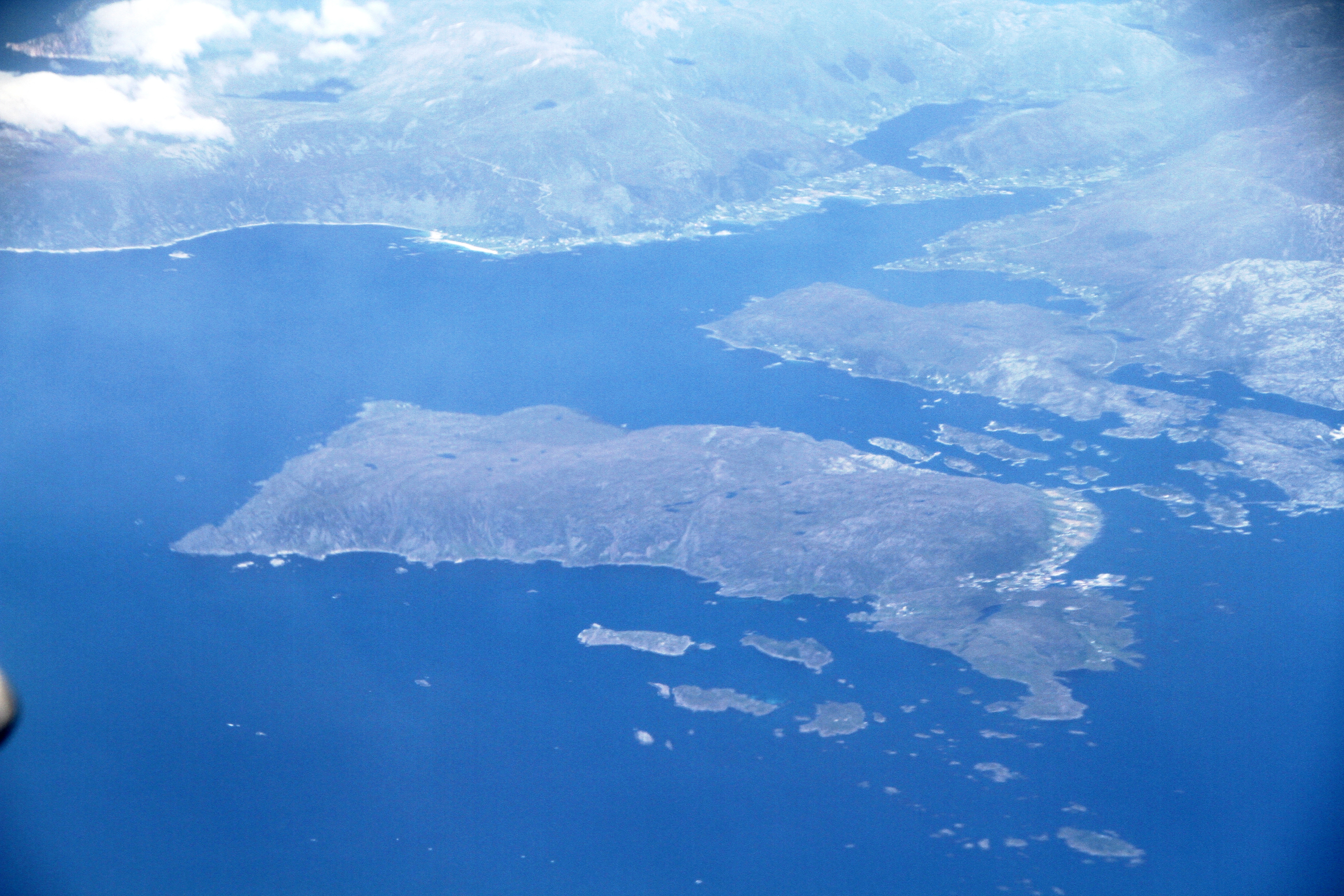
- View of Frøya, with Bremangerlandet in the background
- Interactive map of Frøya

Geography
- Location: Vestland, Norway
- Coordinates: 61.7854°N 4.8482°E
- Area: 15 km^{2} (5.8 sq mi)
- Length: 7 km (4.3 mi)
- Width: 5 km (3.1 mi)
- Highest elevation: 378 m (1240 ft)
- Highest point: Fanneskarvarden

Administration
- Norway
- County: Vestland
- Municipality: Bremanger Municipality

Demographics
- Population: 417 (2020)

Frøya is an island in the western part of Bremanger Municipality in Vestland county, Norway. The 15-square-kilometre (5.8 sq mi) island is located just to the southwest of the big island of Bremangerlandet and its highest point is Fanneskarvarden at an elevation of 378 metres (1,240 ft).

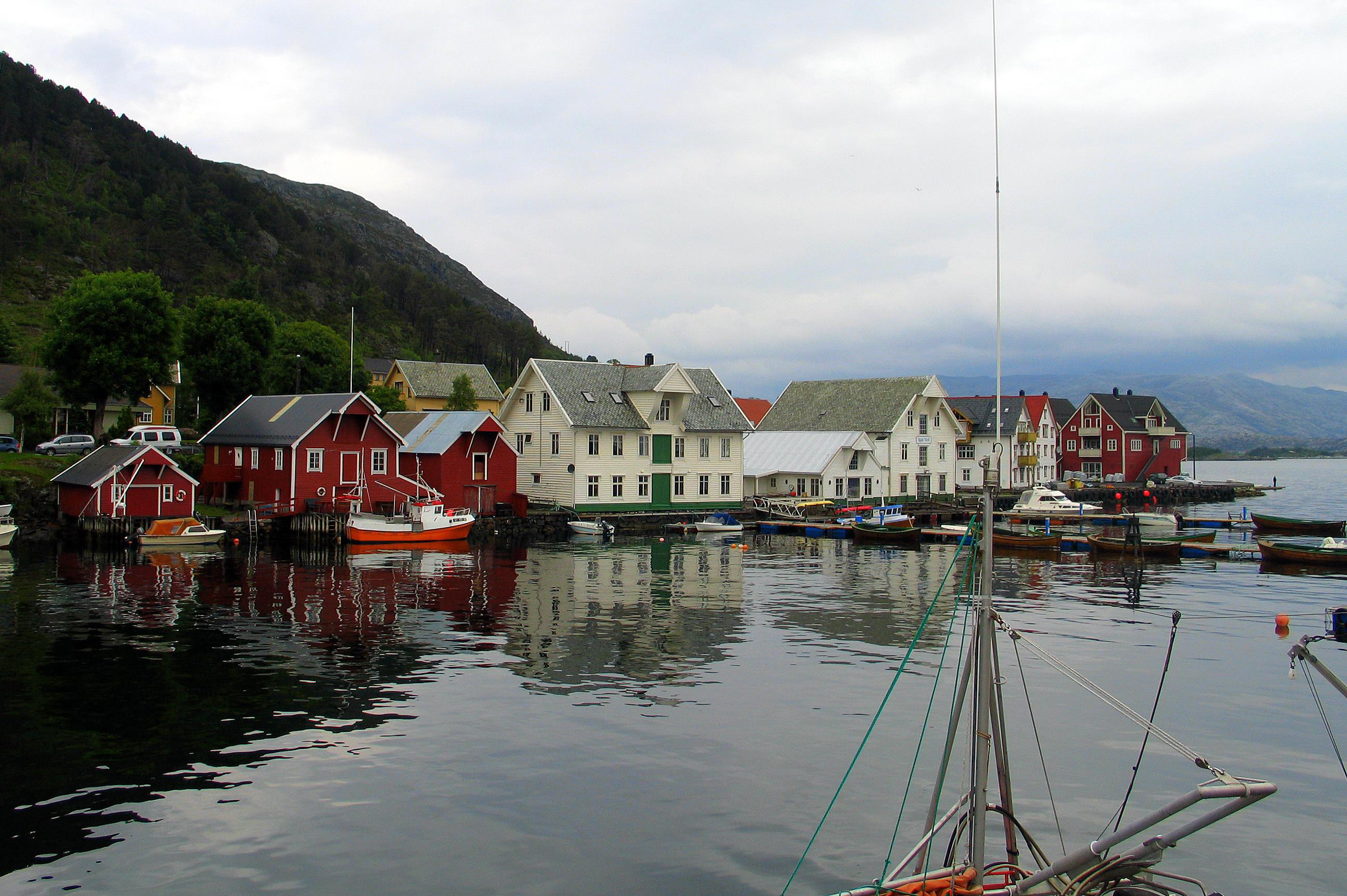
Kalvåg harbor

Almost all the residents of the island live on the southeastern shore. The island contains the main village of Kalvåg as well as the minor settlements of Liset, Steinset, Nesje, Stranda, and Frøyalandet. Frøya is located on the northern side of the Frøysjøen strait, which is part of the seaway between the towns of Florø and Måløy. The island is connected to the nearby island of Bremangerlandet by a series of small bridges, and Bremangerlandet is connected to the mainland via an undersea tunnel and a bridge.

The population (2020) of the island of Frøya is about 417. The main industries on the island are tourism and fish processing. Frøya Church is located on the southeastern side of the island.

== Name ==
Although Frøya is the name of the Norse goddess Frøya or Freya (Freyja), the Old Norse form of the name was Frøy or Frey. Therefore, the name of the island has probably the same root as the name of the Norse god Freyr, brother of Freyja. The names originally were titles: "lord"/"master" or "lady"/"mistress". The oldest meaning of the common word was "(the one) in front; the foremost, the leading" and here in the sense "the island in front of Bremanger".

== See also ==
- List of islands of Norway
