= Frøysjøen =

Strait in Vestland, Norway

- Interactive map of the fjord
- Location: Vestland county, Norway
- Coordinates: 61.8020°N 5.1048°E
- Type: Fjord/Strait
- Basin countries: Norway
- Max. length: 25 kilometres (16 mi)
- Max. width: 2 to 4 kilometres (1.2 to 2.5 mi)

Frøysjøen is a fjord (or more accurately, a strait) in Bremanger Municipality in Vestland county, Norway. The fjord is about 25 kilometres (16 mi) long and between 2 and 4 kilometres (1.2 and 2.5 mi) wide. The fjord runs on a northeast–southwest axis between the mainland of Norway (on the east) and the islands of Bremangerlandet and Frøya (on the west).

The Gulen fjord branches off the Frøysjøen to the east. The main settlements along the fjord include Kalvåg and Berle on the western shore. The mountain Hornelen lies along the shore of the fjord, northeast of Berle. The fjord connects with the open ocean on the west end and it connects to the Nordfjorden on the northeast end. The fjord is a main shipping lane between the towns of Måløy and Florø.
