= Bremangerlandet =

Island in Vestland, Norway

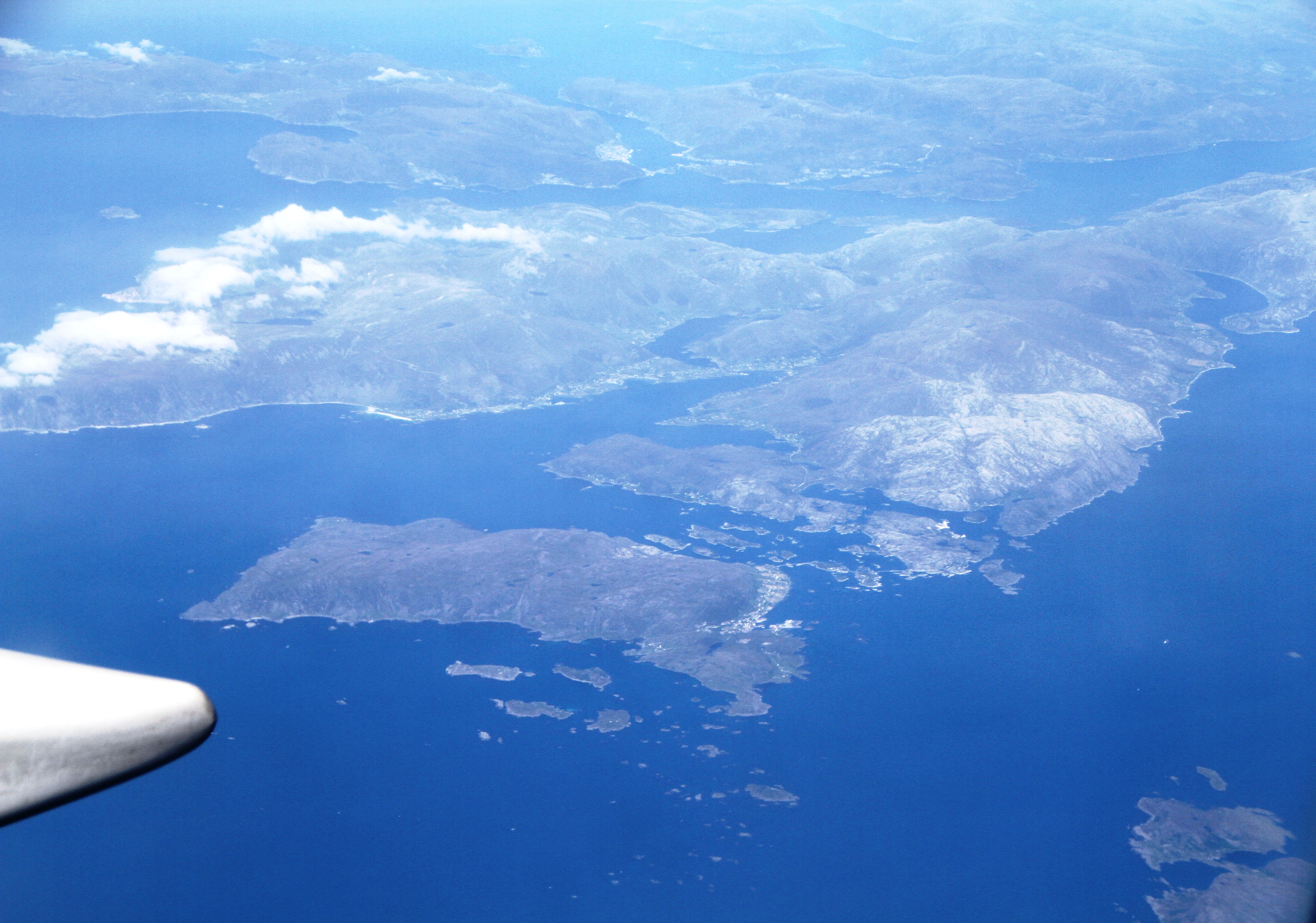
- View of Bremanger (looking to the northeast), with Frøya in the foreground and Vågsøy in the background
- Interactive map of Bremangerlandet

Geography
- Location: Vestland, Norway
- Coordinates: 61.8638°N 5.0060°E
- Area: 153 km^{2} (59 sq mi)
- Length: 16 km (9.9 mi)
- Width: 23 km (14.3 mi)
- Highest elevation: 889 m (2917 ft)
- Highest point: Svartevassegga

Administration
- Norway
- County: Vestland
- Municipality: Bremanger Municipality

Demographics
- Population: c. 1,200 (2018)
- Pop. density: 7.8/km^{2} (20.2/sq mi)

Bremangerlandet is an island in Bremanger Municipality in the traditional district of Nordfjord in Vestland county, Norway. The 153-square-kilometre (59 sq mi) island is one of the largest islands in the county. The highest point on the island is the 889-metre (2,917 ft) tall mountain Svartevassegga, however the cliff at Hornelen, located 1 kilometre (0.62 mi) to the east, is more well-known and has an elevation of 860 metres (2,820 ft). The 4-kilometre (2.5 mi) long lake Dalevatnet is located in the central part of the island.

The island is located northeast of the smaller island of Frøya. Bremangerlandet island lies on the southern side of the mouth of the large Nordfjorden and the island of Vågsøy lies on the north side of the fjord's mouth. The small island of Husevågøy lies in the middle of the fjord, just north of Bremangerlandet.

Bremangerlandet is connected to the island of Frøya (to the southwest) by a series of bridges. There is a ferry connection to Husevågøy and Vågsøy islands to the north. There is also a road that connects Bremangerlandet to the island of Rugsundøya by the Skatestraum Tunnel (and then Rugsundøya connects to the mainland via a bridge). To the southeast, the island is separated from the mainland by the Frøysjøen strait.

The main population center on the island is the village of Bremanger, where Bremanger Church is located. The 0.61-square-kilometre (150-acre) village had a population (2021) of 367 and a population density of 602 inhabitants per square kilometre (1,560/sq mi). Since 2021, the population and area data for this village area has not been separately tracked by Statistics Norway. The smaller village of Berle is located on the eastern side of the island, and it is home to Berle Church.

== Name ==
The meaning of the name is "the (is)land of (the parish) Bremanger". The original name of the island must however have been Smöls. In Norse literature is the mountain Hornelen called Smalsarhorn, which means "the horn of (the island) Smöls". The old name is related to the word möl which means "bank made of stones and gravel". (For the missing s see the Indo-European s-mobile.)

== Media gallery ==
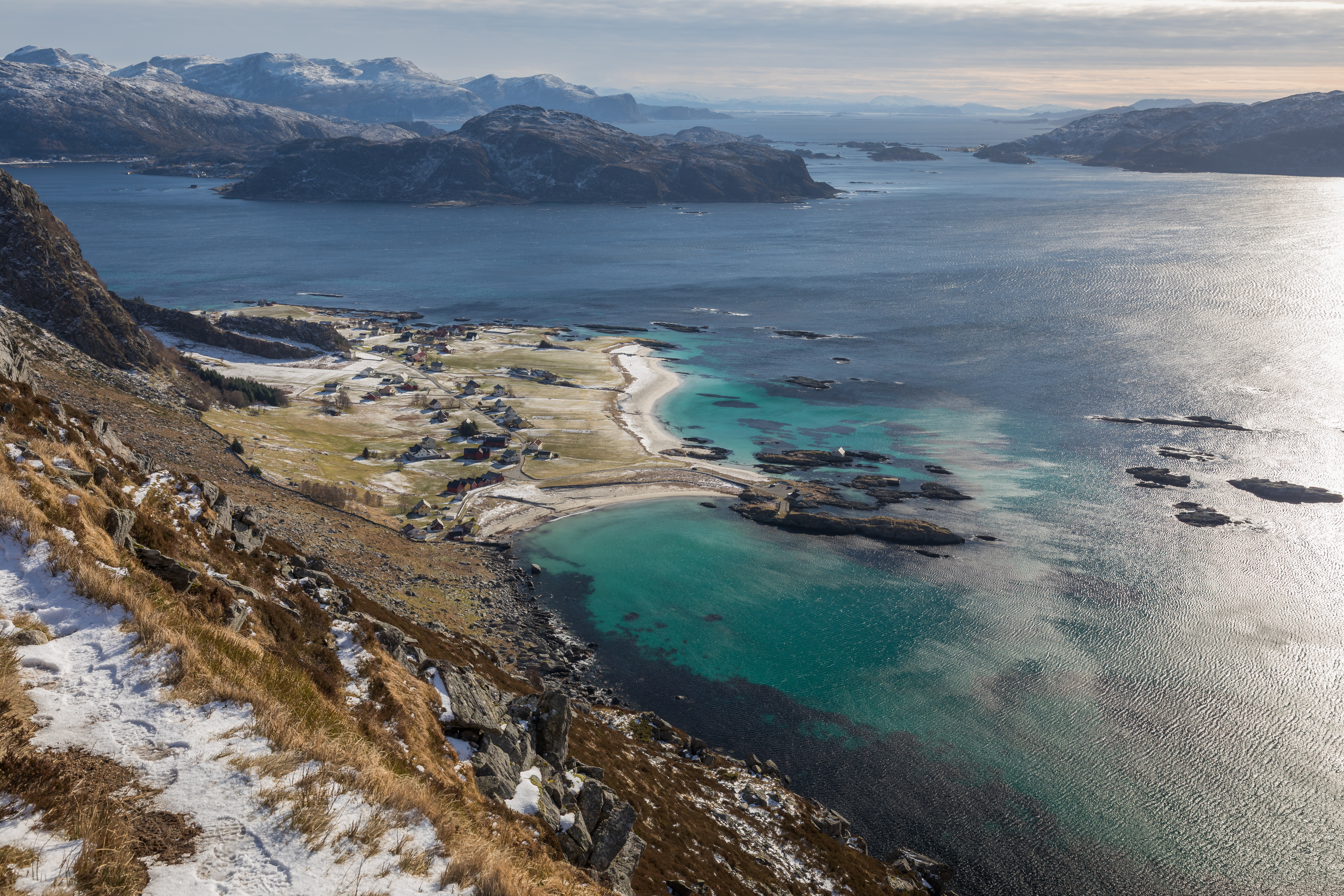
Grotle and Grotlesanden on Bremangerlandet

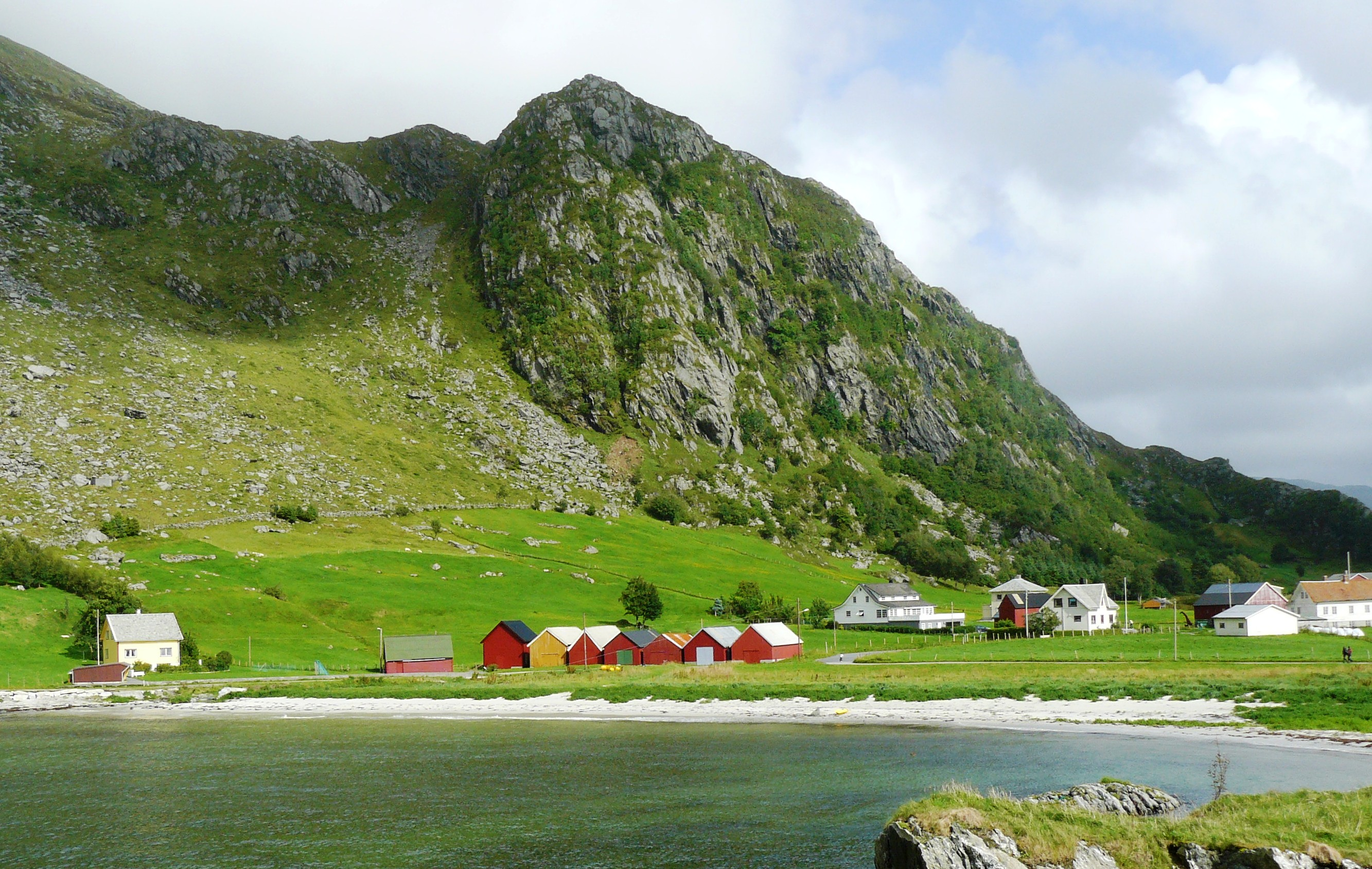
Grotlesanden area

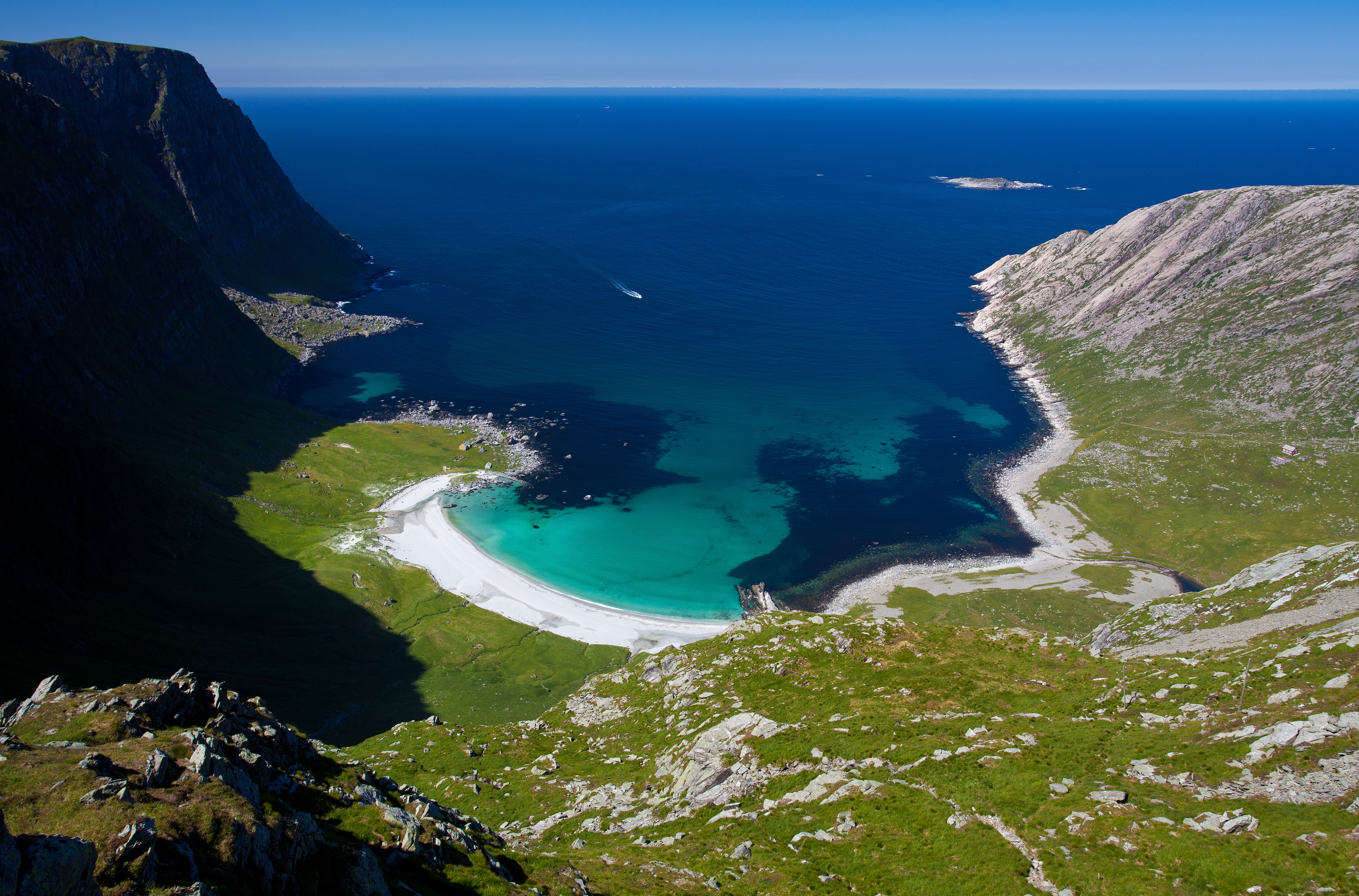
Vetvika beach on the northwestern side of Bremangerlandet

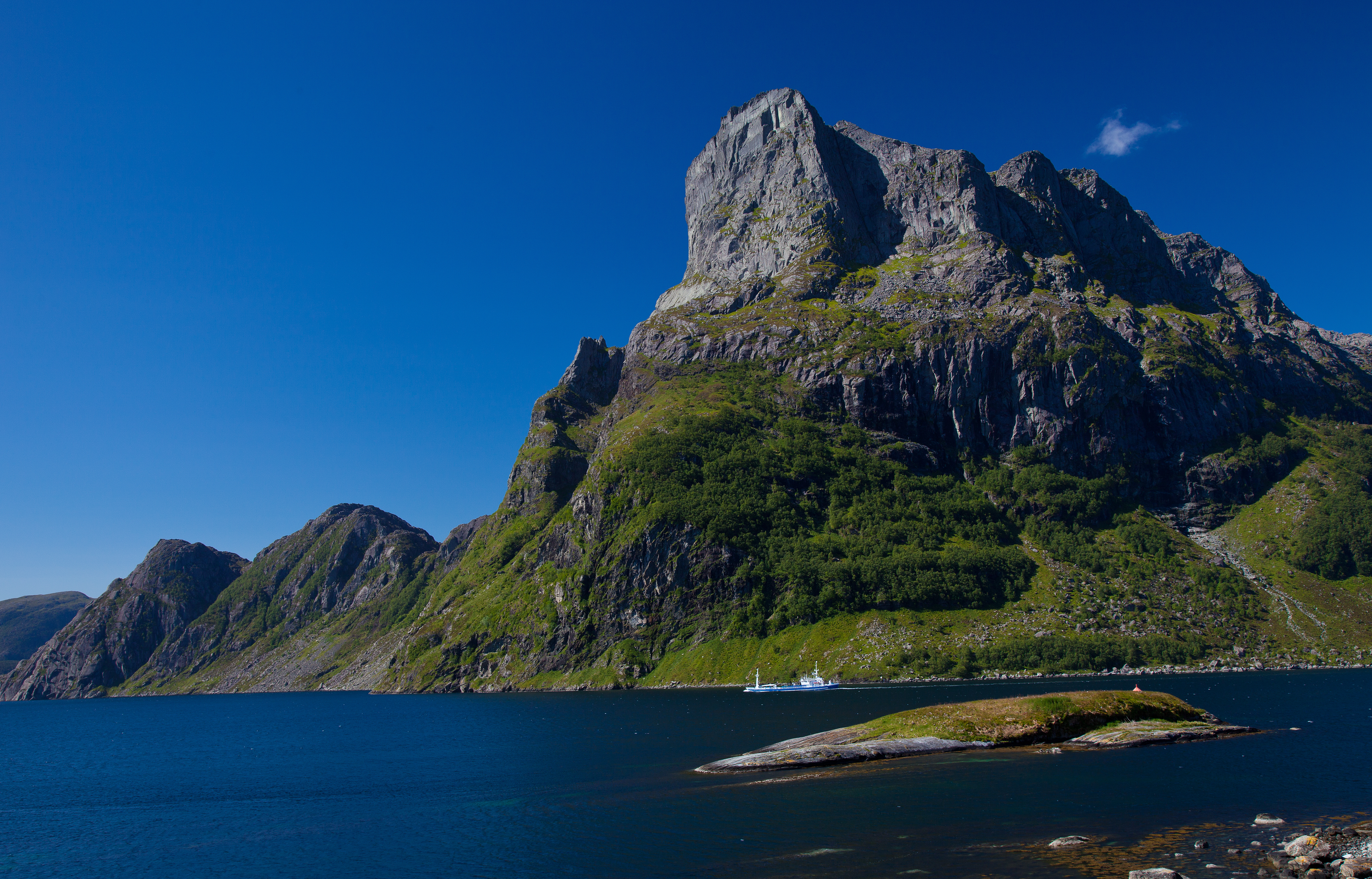
Hornelen on the eastern side of Bremangerlandet

== See also ==
- List of islands of Norway
- List of islands of Norway by area
