= Anne-Pia Nygård =

Norwegian writer (born 1977)

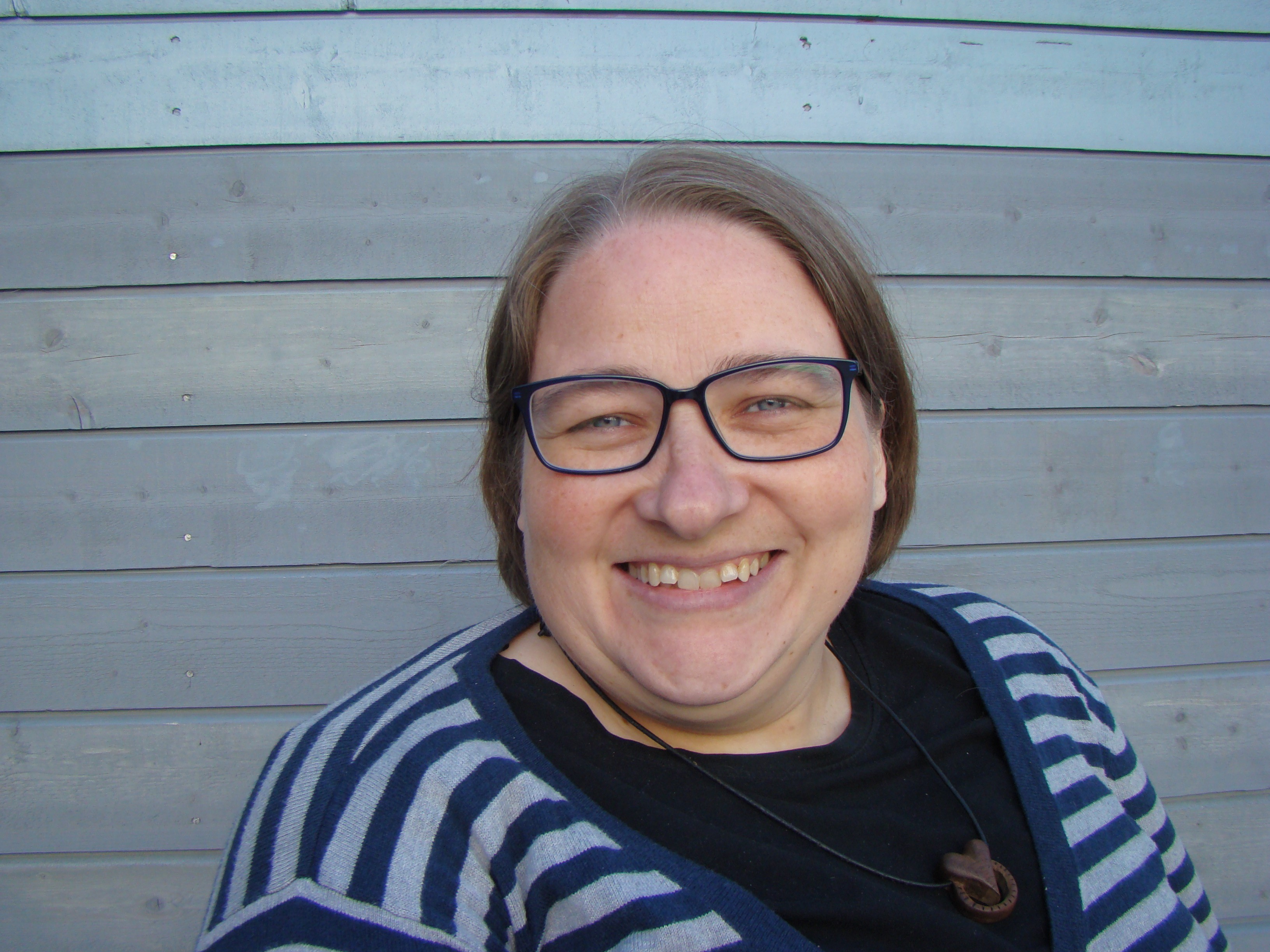
- Born: August 10, 1977 (age 49); Sandane, Gloppen Municipality
- Writing career
- Language: Norwegian
- Genre: Autobiography

Anne-Pia Nygård (born August 10, 1977) is a Norwegian writer. Her debut book was the 2009 autobiography What Nobody Sees (Det som ingen ser).

== Biography ==
Nygård is born and raised in the village of Sandane in Gloppen Municipality. Her mother was from the same place, and her father was from Askøy Municipality.

She attended Firda Upper Secondary School from 1993 until 1996 and later earned her bachelor in North Germanic languages and English language. Her writing debut came about in the spring of 2009, as she was halfway to a master of Nynorsk language and writing. The book, What Nobody Sees was written in Nynorsk. In September 2012 the English version will be published by Loaghtan books.

Nygård was born with a curvature of the spine that worsened as she grew. The condition resulted in much of her childhood spent in and out of hospitals, where she underwent numerous operations. She experienced various accidents and medical mistakes. At ten years of age she lost the use of her legs and became dependent on the wheelchair. Her authorship is based on her experiences with her disability. She describes the embarrassments and confusions of childhood, as well as her meeting with health professionals and coping with family life. The book gives an educational view aimed at health professionals and others work with disabled children and youths.

The autobiography is written in third person, giving her the objectivity to comment her own sufferings, thoughts and actions.

== Bibliography ==
- 2009: What Nobody Sees (Det som ingen ser), Norske Bøker, Illustrasjoner: Dag E. Thorenfeldt, 264 sider, ISBN 978-82-811-2130-0
