= Sandane Church =

Church in Vestland, Norway

- Sandane kyrkje
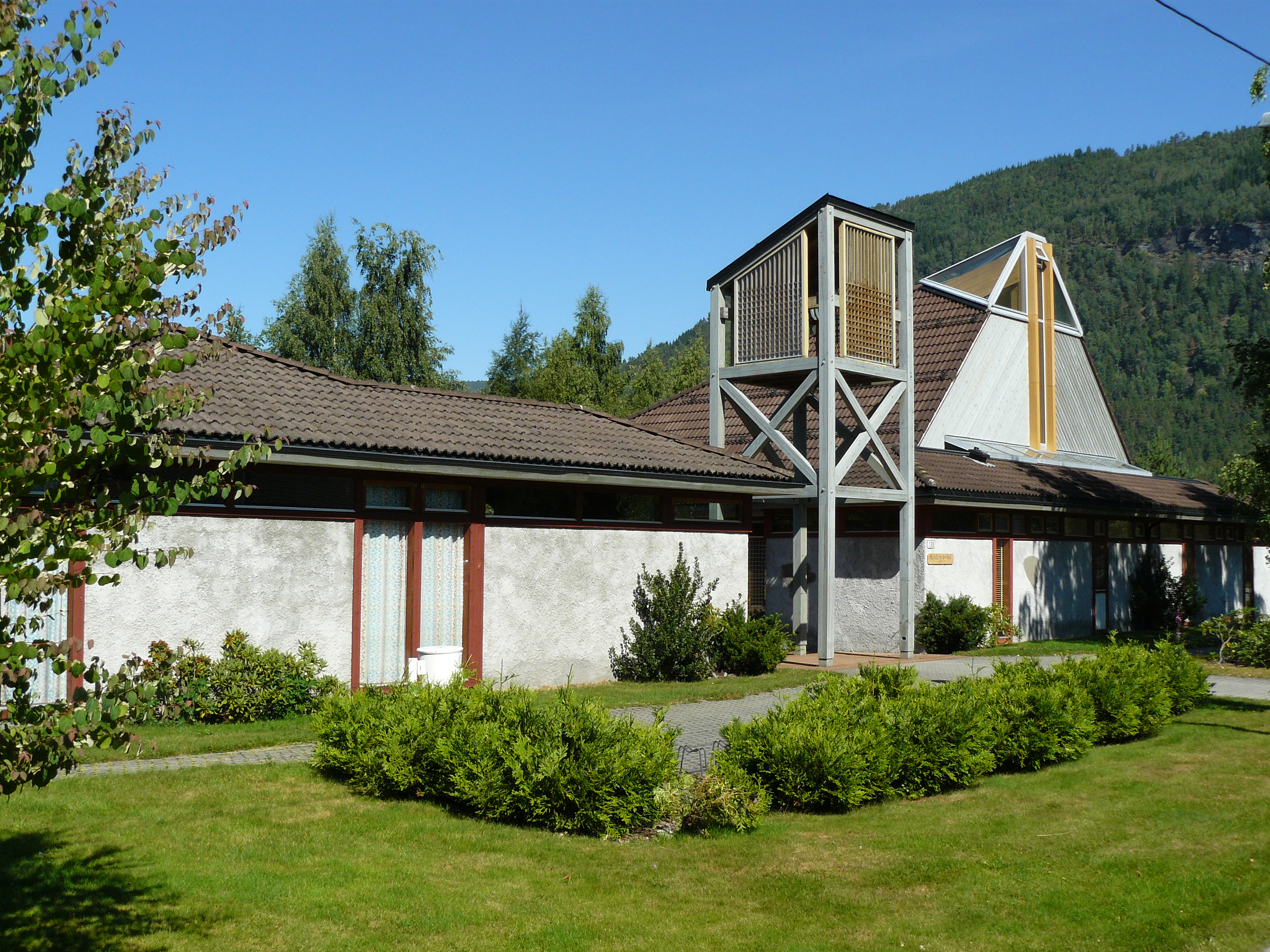
- View of the church
- Sandane Church
- 61°46′10″N 6°13′29″E
- Location: Gloppen Municipality, Vestland
- Country: Norway
- Denomination: Church of Norway
- Churchmanship: Evangelical Lutheran

History
- Former name: Mona kyrkje
- Status: Parish church
- Founded: 1994
- Consecrated: 8 May 1997

Architecture
- Functional status: Active
- Architect: Helge Hjertholm
- Architectural type: Rectangular
- Completed: 1997 (29 years ago)

Specifications
- Capacity: 300
- Materials: Stone

Administration
- Diocese: Bjørgvin bispedømme
- Deanery: Nordfjord prosti
- Parish: Gloppen

Sandane Church (Norwegian: Sandane kyrkje) is a parish church of the Church of Norway in Gloppen Municipality in Vestland county, Norway. It is located in the village of Sandane at the southern end of the Gloppefjorden. It is one of the four churches for the Gloppen parish which is part of the Nordfjord prosti (deanery) in the Diocese of Bjørgvin. The white, concrete church was built in a rectangular design in 1997 by the architect Helge Hjertholm. The church seats about 300 people.

== History ==
Historically, the Sandane area was part of the parish of the medieval Vereide Church. By the 1930s, the people of Sandane began discussing building a new, more modern church. Some fundraising began, but the advent of World War II delayed the project, and it was long after the war before the parish began to really look again at building a new church. In the 1980s, the parish began seriously looking at this issue again. An architectural competition was won by the Bergen architect Helge Hjertholm. Construction began in the early 1990s. The first construction stage included building a church hall with some meeting rooms and a kitchen. This stage was completed in 1994. Soon after, construction on the main sanctuary began. The second stage was completed in 1997. The building was consecrated on 8 May 1997 by Bishop Ole Danbolt Hagesæther. For a while, the church was known as Mona kyrkje since the church was located in the Mona neighborhood of Sandane. In 2016, the church became part of the newly established parish of Gloppen. In 2017, an office area was added on to the church building.

== See also ==
- List of churches in Bjørgvin
