= Kandal, Norway =

Village in Gloppen Municipality, Norway

Kandal Indre Kandal Ytre Kandal
- Village
- Interactive map of Kandal
- Location within Vestland Location within Norway
- Coordinates: 61.67051°N 6.38063°E
- Country: Norway
- Region: Western Norway
- County: Vestland
- District: Nordfjord
- Municipality: Gloppen Municipality
- Elevation: 73 m (240 ft)

Population (2001)
  - Total: 87
- Time zone: UTC+01:00 (CET)
  - Summer (DST): UTC+02:00 (CEST)
- Post Code: 6823 Sandane

Kandal is a small village in Gloppen Municipality in Vestland county, Norway. The village area is located along the west side of the lake Breimsvatnet, about 15 kilometres (9.3 mi) southeast of the municipal center of Sandane. The population of Kandal (2001) is 87.

The village area stretches along the shore of the lake for about 5 kilometres (3.1 mi), with the north end being known as Ytre Kandal (lit. 'outer Kandal') and the southern part is known as Indre Kandal (lit. 'Inner Kandal').

Surrounded by high mountains, the main industry in Kandal is goat farming. There are two mountain dairy farms (Norwegian: seter) in Kandal: Myklandsstøylen and Nesstøylen. In the summer, most of the people take their animals up there to graze them and milk them.
