= Gloppen Municipality =

Municipality in Vestland, Norway

Gloppen Municipality Gloppen kommune
- Municipality
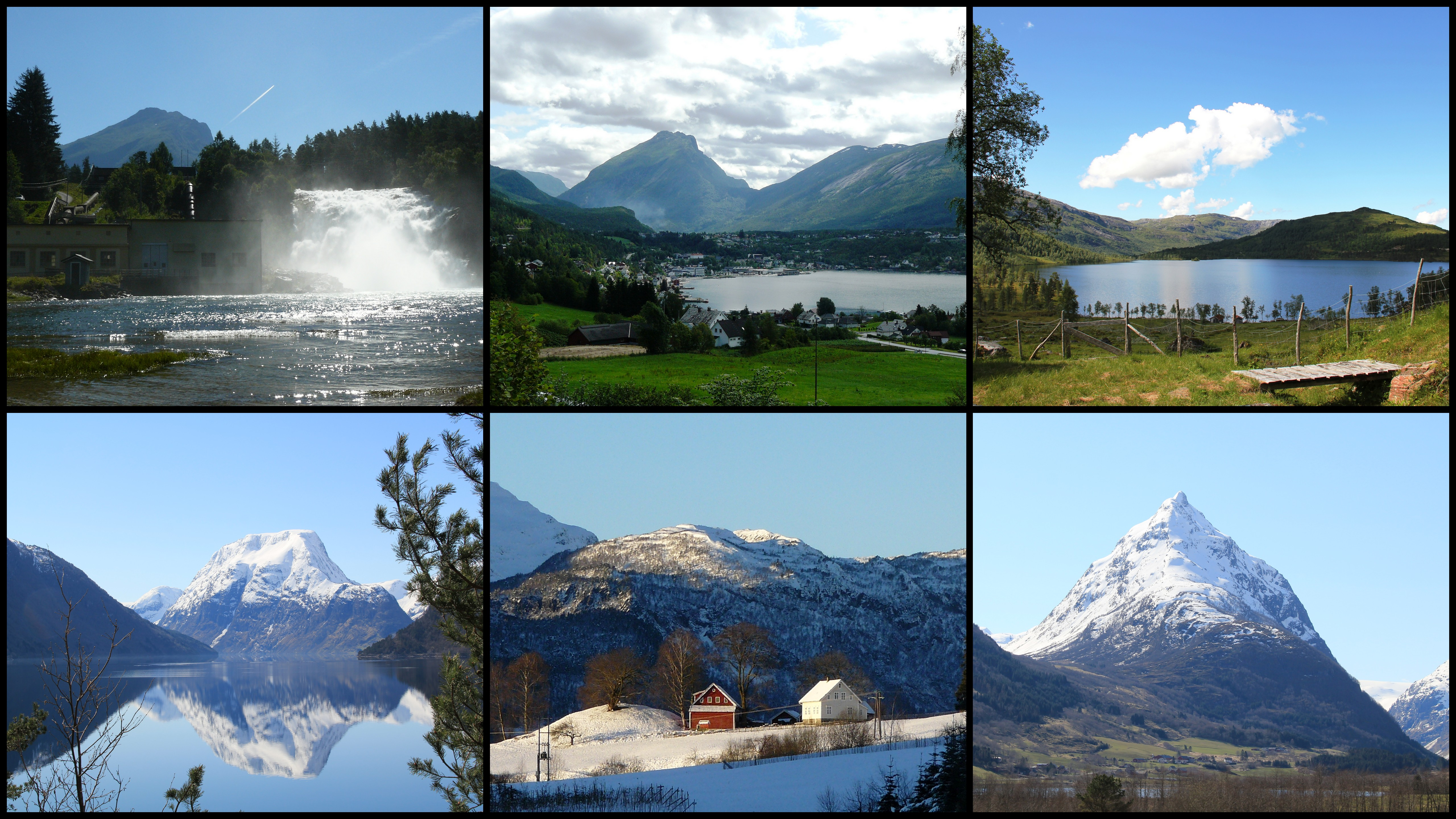
- Views of Gloppen

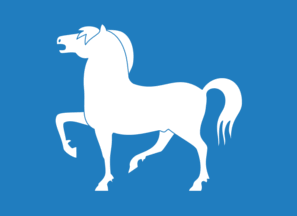
- Flag Coat of arms

- Vestland within Norway

- Gloppen within Vestland
- Coordinates: 61°44′38″N 06°10′14″E
- Country: Norway
- County: Vestland
- District: Nordfjord
- Established: 1 Jan 1838
  - Created as: Formannskapsdistrikt
- Administrative centre: Sandane

Government
  - Mayor (2023): Arnar Kvernevik (Ap)

Area
  - Total: 1,030.53 km^{2} (397.89 sq mi)
  - Land: 962.65 km^{2} (371.68 sq mi)
  - Water: 67.88 km^{2} (26.21 sq mi) 6.6%
  - Rank: #112 in Norway
- Highest elevation: 1,826.59 m (5,992.7 ft)

Population (2025)
  - Total: 5,936
  - Rank: #165 in Norway
  - Density: 5.8/km^{2} (15/sq mi)
  - Change (10 years): ▲ +4.1%
- Demonym: Gloppar

Official language
  - Norwegian form: Nynorsk
- Time zone: UTC+01:00 (CET)
  - Summer (DST): UTC+02:00 (CEST)
- ISO 3166 code: NO-4650
- Website: Official website

Gloppen is a municipality in the county of Vestland, Norway. It is located in the traditional district of Nordfjord. The administrative centre of the municipality is the village of Sandane.

Gloppen Municipality is generally subdivided into three areas: Hyen in the west, Gloppen in the center, and Breim in the east. Each of the areas have their own main service centres. Sandane, the administrative centre of the municipality, is the largest with about 2,500 inhabitants. Sandane, Vereide, and Sørstranda are centered on the Gloppefjorden in Gloppen in the central part of the municipality. The villages of Byrkjelo, Re, Kandal, and Egge are centered on the lake Breimsvatnet in the Breim area in the east. The villages of Hyen, Eimhjellen, and Solheim are located around the Hyefjorden in Hyen in the west.

The 1,030.53-square-kilometre (397.89 sq mi) municipality is the 112th largest by area out of the 357 municipalities in Norway. Gloppen Municipality is the 165th most populous municipality in Norway with a population of 5,936. The municipality's population density is 5.8 inhabitants per square kilometre (15/sq mi) and its population has increased by 4.1% over the previous 10-year period.

The whole municipality sits on the southern side of the large Nordfjorden. The European route E39 highway runs through the municipality before crossing the Nordfjorden on a car ferry. The Sandane Airport, Anda is located along the E39 highway, just north of Vereide.

== General information ==
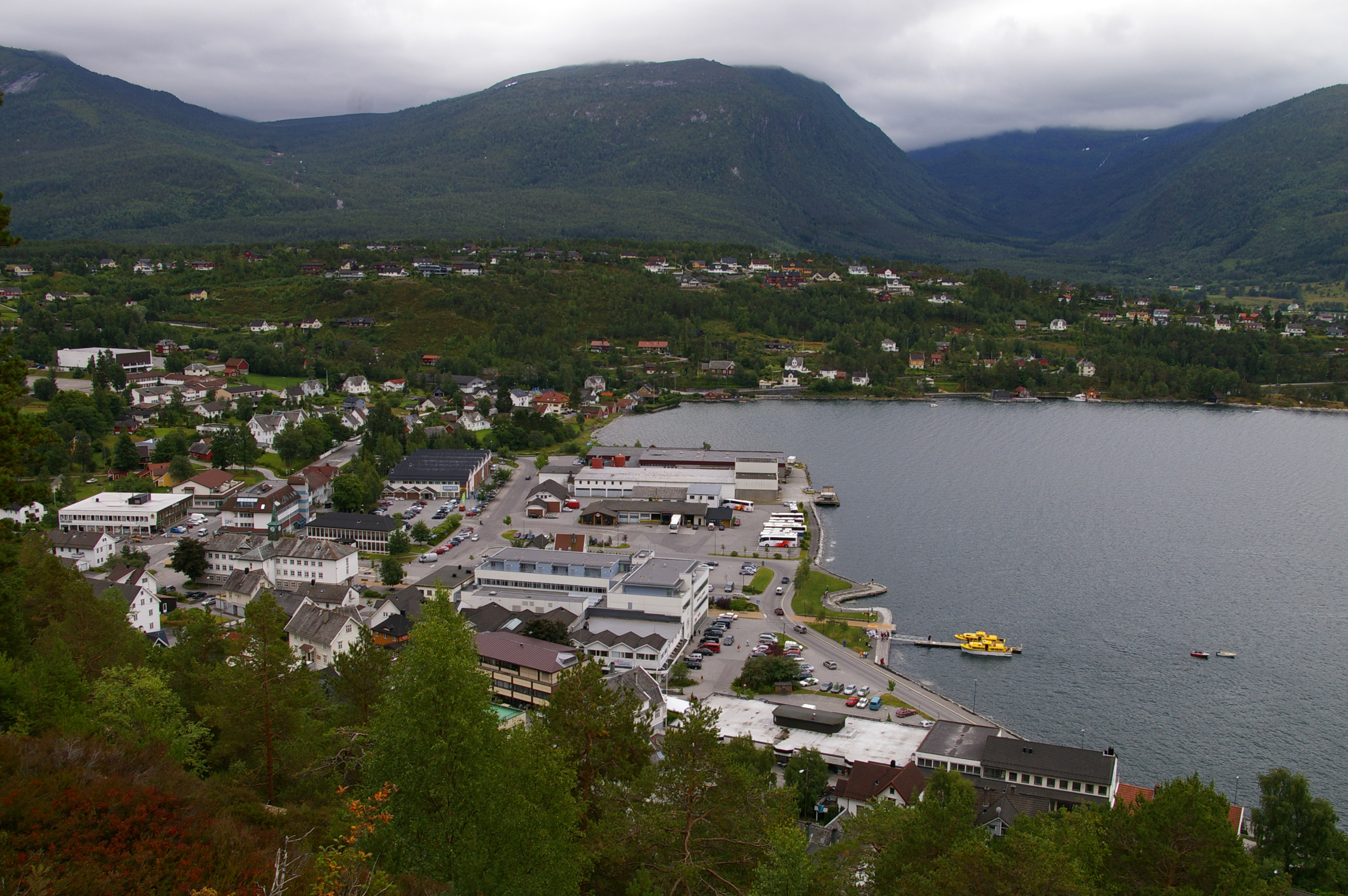
Sandane

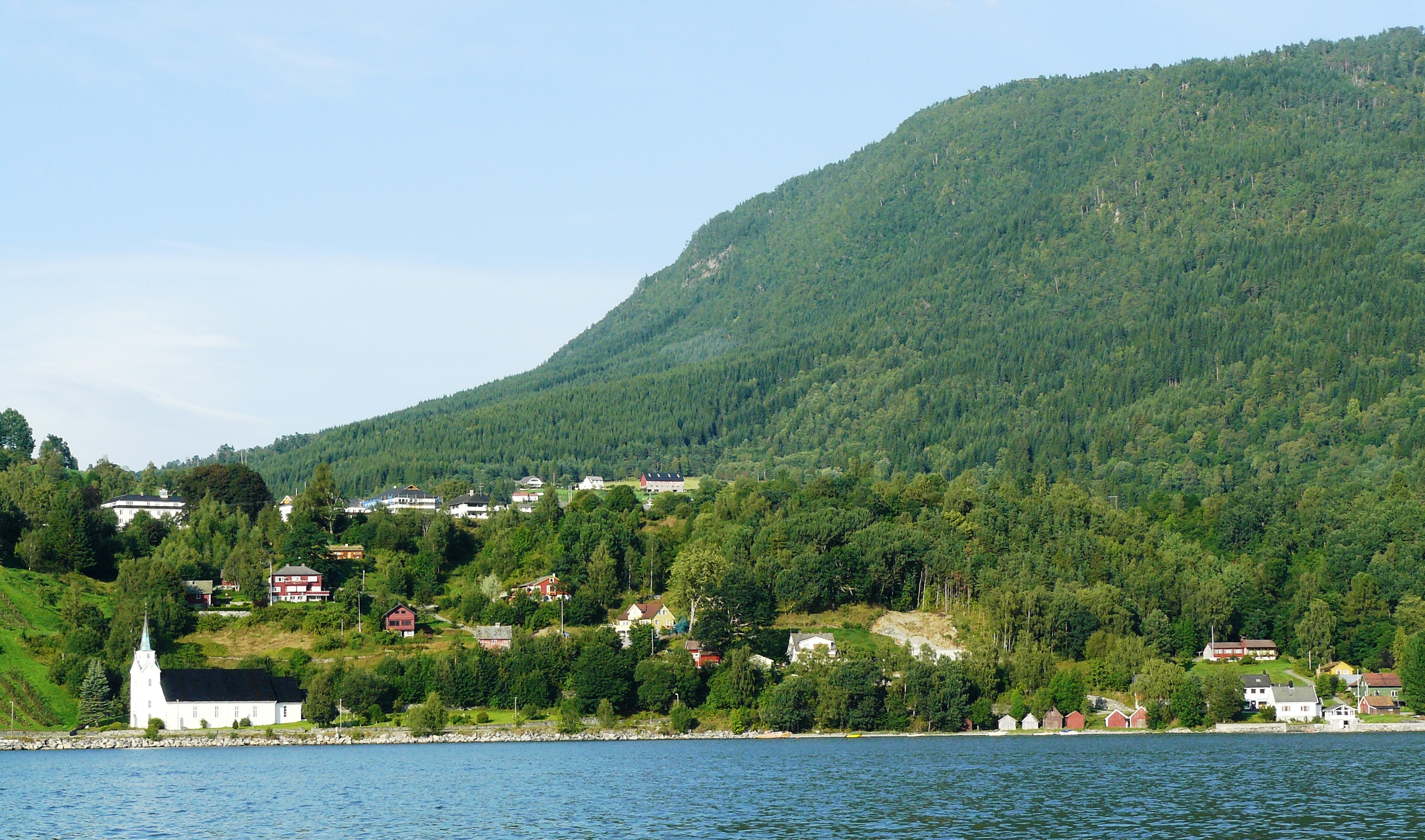
Vereide Church

The parish of Gloppen was established as a municipality on 1 January 1838 (see formannskapsdistrikt law). The original municipality included the sub-parishes (sokn) of Gimmestad, Breim, and Vereide. On 1 January 1886, Gloppen Municipality was divided. The eastern part of the municipality (population: 1,823) was separated to form the new Breim Municipality. This left Gloppen Municipality with 2,970 residents.

During the 1960s, there were many municipal mergers across Norway due to the work of the Schei Committee. On 1 January 1964, Breim Municipality (population: 1,731) was merged back into Gloppen Municipality. After the merger, the population of Gloppen Municipality was 5,702. On 1 January 1965, the Hoplandsgrenda area (population: 42) of Gloppen Municipality (on the northern shore of the Nordfjorden) was transferred to neighboring Stryn Municipality. On 1 January 1992, the Lote area of Gloppen Municipality (also on the north side of the Nordfjorden) was transferred to Eid Municipality. The remaining land of Gloppen Municipality was then only located south of the Nordfjorden.

Historically, this municipality was part of the old Sogn og Fjordane county. On 1 January 2020, the municipality became a part of the newly-formed Vestland county (after Hordaland and Sogn og Fjordane counties were merged).

=== Name ===
The municipality (originally the parish) is named after the local Gloppefjorden (Old Norse: Gloppi) since it is one of the central geographical features of the municipality. The name is probably derived from the word gloppa which means "narrow opening" or "mountain gorge".

=== Coat of arms ===
The coat of arms was granted on 19 December 1986. The official blazon is "Azure, a horse passant argent" (Norwegian: På blå grunn ein gåande sølv hest). This means the arms have a blue field (background) and the charge is a fjord horse. The horse has a tincture of argent which means it is commonly colored white, but if it is made out of metal, then silver is used. The design depicts the Norwegian fjord horse which is a relatively small, but very strong, horse breed from the mountainous regions of Western Norway. The arms were designed by Petter Eide. The municipal flag has the same design as the coat of arms.

=== Churches ===
The Church of Norway has four parishes (sokn) within Gloppen Municipality. It is part of the Nordfjord prosti (deanery) in the Diocese of Bjørgvin.

Churches in Gloppen Municipality
| Parish (sokn) | Church name | Location of the church | Year built |
|---|---|---|---|
| Breim | Breim Church | Re | 1886 |
| Gimmestad | Gimmestad Church | Sørstranda | 1910 |
| Gimmestad | Old Gimmestad Church | Sørstranda | 1690 |
| Hyen | Hyen Church | Hyen | 1876 |
| Vereide | Sandane Church | Sandane | 1997 |
| Vereide | Vereide Church | Vereide | 12th century |

== Government ==
Gloppen Municipality is responsible for primary education (through 10th grade), outpatient health services, senior citizen services, welfare and other social services, zoning, economic development, and municipal roads and utilities. The municipality is governed by a municipal council of directly elected representatives. The mayor is indirectly elected by a vote of the municipal council. The municipality is under the jurisdiction of the Sogn og Fjordane District Court and the Gulating Court of Appeal.

=== Municipal council ===
The municipal council (Kommunestyre) of Gloppen Municipality is made up of 27 representatives that are elected to four year terms. The tables below show the current and historical composition of the council by political party.

Gloppen kommunestyre 2023–2027
| Party name (in Nynorsk) | Number of representatives |
|---|---|
| Labour Party (Arbeidarpartiet) | 5 |
| Green Party (Miljøpartiet Dei Grøne) | 2 |
| Conservative Party (Høgre) | 6 |
| Christian Democratic Party (Kristeleg Folkeparti) | 3 |
| Centre Party (Senterpartiet) | 8 |
| Socialist Left Party (Sosialistisk Venstreparti) | 2 |
| Liberal Party (Venstre) | 1 |
| Total number of members: | 27 |

Gloppen kommunestyre 2019–2023
| Party name (in Nynorsk) | Number of representatives |
|---|---|
| Labour Party (Arbeidarpartiet) | 3 |
| Green Party (Miljøpartiet Dei Grøne) | 2 |
| Conservative Party (Høgre) | 2 |
| Christian Democratic Party (Kristeleg Folkeparti) | 4 |
| Centre Party (Senterpartiet) | 13 |
| Socialist Left Party (Sosialistisk Venstreparti) | 1 |
| Liberal Party (Venstre) | 1 |
| Social Democrats (Samfunnsdemokratane) | 1 |
| Total number of members: | 27 |

Gloppen kommunestyre 2015–2019
| Party name (in Nynorsk) | Number of representatives |
|---|---|
| Labour Party (Arbeidarpartiet) | 2 |
| Green Party (Miljøpartiet Dei Grøne) | 1 |
| Conservative Party (Høgre) | 2 |
| Christian Democratic Party (Kristeleg Folkeparti) | 7 |
| Centre Party (Senterpartiet) | 11 |
| Socialist Left Party (Sosialistisk Venstreparti) | 1 |
| Liberal Party (Venstre) | 1 |
| Social Democrats (Samfunnsdemokratane) | 2 |
| Total number of members: | 27 |

Gloppen kommunestyre 2011–2015
| Party name (in Nynorsk) | Number of representatives |
|---|---|
| Labour Party (Arbeidarpartiet) | 3 |
| Conservative Party (Høgre) | 5 |
| Christian Democratic Party (Kristeleg Folkeparti) | 3 |
| Centre Party (Senterpartiet) | 9 |
| Socialist Left Party (Sosialistisk Venstreparti) | 1 |
| Liberal Party (Venstre) | 2 |
| Social Democrats (Samfunnsdemokratane) | 4 |
| Total number of members: | 27 |

Gloppen kommunestyre 2007–2011
| Party name (in Nynorsk) | Number of representatives |
|---|---|
| Labour Party (Arbeidarpartiet) | 3 |
| Progress Party (Framstegspartiet) | 1 |
| Conservative Party (Høgre) | 4 |
| Christian Democratic Party (Kristeleg Folkeparti) | 3 |
| Centre Party (Senterpartiet) | 13 |
| Socialist Left Party (Sosialistisk Venstreparti) | 2 |
| Liberal Party (Venstre) | 1 |
| Total number of members: | 27 |

Gloppen kommunestyre 2003–2007
| Party name (in Nynorsk) | Number of representatives |
|---|---|
| Labour Party (Arbeidarpartiet) | 3 |
| Progress Party (Framstegspartiet) | 1 |
| Conservative Party (Høgre) | 3 |
| Christian Democratic Party (Kristeleg Folkeparti) | 3 |
| Centre Party (Senterpartiet) | 13 |
| Socialist Left Party (Sosialistisk Venstreparti) | 3 |
| Liberal Party (Venstre) | 1 |
| Total number of members: | 27 |

Gloppen kommunestyre 1999–2003
| Party name (in Nynorsk) | Number of representatives |
|---|---|
| Labour Party (Arbeidarpartiet) | 4 |
| Conservative Party (Høgre) | 5 |
| Christian Democratic Party (Kristeleg Folkeparti) | 7 |
| Centre Party (Senterpartiet) | 12 |
| Socialist Left Party (Sosialistisk Venstreparti) | 2 |
| Liberal Party (Venstre) | 3 |
| Total number of members: | 33 |

Gloppen kommunestyre 1995–1999
| Party name (in Nynorsk) | Number of representatives |
|---|---|
| Labour Party (Arbeidarpartiet) | 5 |
| Conservative Party (Høgre) | 3 |
| Christian Democratic Party (Kristeleg Folkeparti) | 5 |
| Centre Party (Senterpartiet) | 15 |
| Socialist Left Party (Sosialistisk Venstreparti) | 2 |
| Liberal Party (Venstre) | 3 |
| Total number of members: | 33 |

Gloppen kommunestyre 1991–1995
| Party name (in Nynorsk) | Number of representatives |
|---|---|
| Labour Party (Arbeidarpartiet) | 4 |
| Conservative Party (Høgre) | 4 |
| Christian Democratic Party (Kristeleg Folkeparti) | 6 |
| Centre Party (Senterpartiet) | 15 |
| Socialist Left Party (Sosialistisk Venstreparti) | 2 |
| Liberal Party (Venstre) | 2 |
| Total number of members: | 33 |

Gloppen kommunestyre 1987–1991
| Party name (in Nynorsk) | Number of representatives |
|---|---|
| Labour Party (Arbeidarpartiet) | 5 |
| Conservative Party (Høgre) | 6 |
| Christian Democratic Party (Kristeleg Folkeparti) | 5 |
| Centre Party (Senterpartiet) | 13 |
| Liberal Party (Venstre) | 3 |
| Socialist Common List (Sosialistisk Samlingsliste) | 1 |
| Total number of members: | 33 |

Gloppen kommunestyre 1983–1987
| Party name (in Nynorsk) | Number of representatives |
|---|---|
| Labour Party (Arbeidarpartiet) | 5 |
| Conservative Party (Høgre) | 6 |
| Christian Democratic Party (Kristeleg Folkeparti) | 6 |
| Centre Party (Senterpartiet) | 12 |
| Liberal Party (Venstre) | 3 |
| Socialist Common List (Sosialistisk Samlingsliste) | 1 |
| Total number of members: | 33 |

Gloppen kommunestyre 1979–1983
| Party name (in Nynorsk) | Number of representatives |
|---|---|
| Labour Party (Arbeidarpartiet) | 3 |
| Conservative Party (Høgre) | 5 |
| Christian Democratic Party (Kristeleg Folkeparti) | 6 |
| Centre Party (Senterpartiet) | 8 |
| Liberal Party (Venstre) | 3 |
| Breim's List (Breim si liste) | 8 |
| Total number of members: | 33 |

Gloppen kommunestyre 1975–1979
| Party name (in Nynorsk) | Number of representatives |
|---|---|
| Labour Party (Arbeidarpartiet) | 3 |
| Conservative Party (Høgre) | 2 |
| Christian Democratic Party (Kristeleg Folkeparti) | 6 |
| New People's Party (Nye Folkepartiet) | 1 |
| Centre Party (Senterpartiet) | 11 |
| Liberal Party (Venstre) | 2 |
| Local list for Inner Breim (Krinsliste for Indre Breim) | 5 |
| Local list for Lower Breim (Krinsliste for Nedre Breim) | 3 |
| Total number of members: | 33 |

Gloppen kommunestyre 1971–1975
| Party name (in Nynorsk) | Number of representatives |
|---|---|
| Labour Party (Arbeidarpartiet) | 4 |
| Conservative Party (Høgre) | 2 |
| Christian Democratic Party (Kristeleg Folkeparti) | 4 |
| Centre Party (Senterpartiet) | 11 |
| Liberal Party (Venstre) | 4 |
| Local List(s) (Lokale lister) | 8 |
| Total number of members: | 33 |

Gloppen kommunestyre 1967–1971
| Party name (in Nynorsk) | Number of representatives |
|---|---|
| Labour Party (Arbeidarpartiet) | 4 |
| Conservative Party (Høgre) | 2 |
| Christian Democratic Party (Kristeleg Folkeparti) | 3 |
| Centre Party (Senterpartiet) | 11 |
| Liberal Party (Venstre) | 4 |
| Local List(s) (Lokale lister) | 9 |
| Total number of members: | 33 |

Gloppen kommunestyre 1963–1967
| Party name (in Nynorsk) | Number of representatives |
|---|---|
| Labour Party (Arbeidarpartiet) | 4 |
| Conservative Party (Høgre) | 1 |
| Christian Democratic Party (Kristeleg Folkeparti) | 4 |
| Centre Party (Senterpartiet) | 17 |
| Liberal Party (Venstre) | 5 |
| Local List(s) (Lokale lister) | 2 |
| Total number of members: | 33 |
Note: On 1 January 1964, Breim Municipality became part of Gloppen Municipality.

Gloppen heradsstyre 1959–1963
| Party name (in Nynorsk) | Number of representatives |
|---|---|
| Labour Party (Arbeidarpartiet) | 4 |
| Conservative Party (Høgre) | 1 |
| Christian Democratic Party (Kristeleg Folkeparti) | 3 |
| Centre Party (Senterpartiet) | 13 |
| Liberal Party (Venstre) | 7 |
| Local List(s) (Lokale lister) | 1 |
| Total number of members: | 29 |

Gloppen heradsstyre 1955–1959
| Party name (in Nynorsk) | Number of representatives |
|---|---|
| Labour Party (Arbeidarpartiet) | 5 |
| Conservative Party (Høgre) | 2 |
| Christian Democratic Party (Kristeleg Folkeparti) | 3 |
| Farmers' Party (Bondepartiet) | 13 |
| Liberal Party (Venstre) | 6 |
| Total number of members: | 29 |

Gloppen heradsstyre 1951–1955
| Party name (in Nynorsk) | Number of representatives |
|---|---|
| Labour Party (Arbeidarpartiet) | 5 |
| Conservative Party (Høgre) | 2 |
| Farmers' Party (Bondepartiet) | 12 |
| Liberal Party (Venstre) | 10 |
| Total number of members: | 29 |

Gloppen heradsstyre 1947–1951
| Party name (in Nynorsk) | Number of representatives |
|---|---|
| Labour Party (Arbeidarpartiet) | 3 |
| Farmers' Party (Bondepartiet) | 5 |
| Liberal Party (Venstre) | 5 |
| Local List(s) (Lokale lister) | 16 |
| Total number of members: | 29 |

Gloppen heradsstyre 1945–1947
| Party name (in Nynorsk) | Number of representatives |
|---|---|
| Labour Party (Arbeidarpartiet) | 3 |
| Local List(s) (Lokale lister) | 26 |
| Total number of members: | 29 |

Gloppen heradsstyre 1937–1941*
| Party name (in Nynorsk) | Number of representatives |
|---|---|
| Labour Party (Arbeidarpartiet) | 5 |
| Liberal Party (Venstre) | 2 |
| Joint List(s) of Non-Socialist Parties (Borgarlege Felleslister) | 13 |
| Local List(s) (Lokale lister) | 9 |
| Total number of members: | 29 |
Note: Due to the German occupation of Norway during World War II, no elections were held for new municipal councils until after the war ended in 1945.

=== Mayors ===
The mayor (Nynorsk: ordførar) of Gloppen Municipality is the political leader of the municipality and the chairperson of the municipal council. Here is a list of people who have held this position:

- 1838–1839: Christoffer Nielsen Scherdahlen
- 1840–1843: Rev. Rasmus Rolfsen Arnet
- 1844–1845: Gabriel R. Aasebø
- 1846–1847: Rasmus L. Gaasemyr
- 1848–1851: Rev. Jørgen Meyer Heffermehl
- 1852–1855: Rasmus L. Gaasemyr
- 1856–1865: Rev. Jørgen Meyer Heffermehl
- 1866–1869: Rev. Abraham Vilhelm Heffermehl
- 1870–1883: Ole Josefsen Hestenes
- 1884–1886: Jakob J. Myklebust (V)
- 1886–1893: Ole Josefsen Hestenes
- 1894–1902: Dr. Johan C. Bugge
- 1903–1913: Jakob J. Lothe
- 1914–1919: Jon A. Vereide
- 1919–1922: Elias Faleide (V)
- 1923–1928: Jon A. Vereide
- 1928–1941: Elias Faleide (V)
- 1942–1945: Martin R. Andenes (NS)
- 1945–1947: Elias Faleide (V)
- 1947–1956: Alf Gloppestad
- 1956–1962: John Austrheim (Sp)
- 1962–1964: Elias Eimhjellen
- 1965–1967: Johnny Bakke (V)
- 1968–1975: Ola M. Hestenes (Sp)
- 1976–1988: Olav Moritsgård (Sp)
- 1988–1999: Nils R. Sandal (Sp)
- 1999–2015: Anders Ryssdal (Sp)
- 2015–2023: Leidulf Gloppestad (Sp)
- 2023–present: Arnar Kvernevik (Ap)

== Geography ==
The municipality is located southern shores of the Nordfjorden. To the north is Stad Municipality, to the east is Stryn Municipality, to the south is Sunnfjord Municipality, and to the west is Kinn Municipality and Bremanger Municipality. There are two fjords that branch off the main fjord into Gloppen: Hyefjorden and Gloppefjorden.

Gloppen has a natural landscape with virtually unspoiled nature ranging from sea level up to high-alpine mountains of some 1,800 metres (5,900 ft) height. The highest point in the municipality is the 1,826.59-metre (5,992.7 ft) tall mountain Snønipa, located at the Myklebustbreen glacier. The lakes Breimsvatnet and Eimhjellevatnet are, respectively, the first and second largest lakes in Gloppen. There are also some large glaciers such as Ålfotbreen, Gjegnalundsbreen, and Myklebustbreen. The river Gloppeelva runs from the lake Breimsvatnet to the Gloppefjorden.

== Climate ==
Gloppen has a temperate oceanic climate (Cfb in the Köppen climate classification), also known as a marine west coast climate. The wettest season is autumn and winter, with December as the wettest month. The driest season is April - August. The driest month May gets about a third of the average precipitation in December. The average date for the last overnight freeze (low below 0 °C (32.0 °F)) in spring is 27 April and average date for first freeze in autumn is 15 October giving a frost-free season of 170 days (1981-2010 average). In January 1987, Sandane recorded a low of −19.5 °C (−3.1 °F)), and June 2020 recorded a high of 31.2 °C (88.2 °F)). In October 2005, Sandane recorded 24 °C (75.2 °F)), which was new October record for Vestland province. The Sandane weather station started recording in June 1957. There is also a weather station at Sandane Airport, showing similar temperatures.

The parts of the municipality that are further inland, such as Byrkjelo and Myklebust have cooler winters, slightly warmer summers and more precipitation. This gives these places plenty of snowfall during the winter, which often turn to slush as a result of rain-on-snow events. The western receives the most precipitation, with the Eimhjellen station averaging nearly 3000 mm per year. Up on the Ålfotbreen glacier, partly in the municipality, precipitation is estimated to be around 6,000 millimetres (240 in) annually.

Climate data for Sandane 1991–2020 (51 m)
| Month | Jan | Feb | Mar | Apr | May | Jun | Jul | Aug | Sep | Oct | Nov | Dec | Year |
|---|---|---|---|---|---|---|---|---|---|---|---|---|---|
| Mean daily maximum °C (°F) | 3.4 (38.1) | 3.5 (38.3) | 5.8 (42.4) | 10 (50) | 14.2 (57.6) | 17.3 (63.1) | 19.5 (67.1) | 18.6 (65.5) | 14.9 (58.8) | 9.7 (49.5) | 5.9 (42.6) | 3.5 (38.3) | 10.5 (50.9) |
| Daily mean °C (°F) | 1.1 (34.0) | 0.7 (33.3) | 2.5 (36.5) | 6 (43) | 9.7 (49.5) | 13 (55) | 15.4 (59.7) | 14.8 (58.6) | 11.4 (52.5) | 6.6 (43.9) | 3.3 (37.9) | 1.2 (34.2) | 7.1 (44.8) |
| Mean daily minimum °C (°F) | −1.7 (28.9) | −2.1 (28.2) | −0.4 (31.3) | 2.4 (36.3) | 5.4 (41.7) | 9.1 (48.4) | 11.6 (52.9) | 11.2 (52.2) | 8.2 (46.8) | 3.8 (38.8) | 0.8 (33.4) | −1.5 (29.3) | 3.9 (39.0) |
| Average precipitation mm (inches) | 155 (6.1) | 122 (4.8) | 110 (4.3) | 66 (2.6) | 62 (2.4) | 69 (2.7) | 71 (2.8) | 96 (3.8) | 129 (5.1) | 153 (6.0) | 150 (5.9) | 174 (6.9) | 1,357 (53.4) |
| Average precipitation days (≥ 1.0 mm) | 16 | 15 | 15 | 12 | 10 | 11 | 12 | 15 | 14 | 15 | 15 | 17 | 167 |
Source 1: yr.no/Met.no
Source 2: Noaa WMO averages 91-2020 Norway

Climate data for Mykjebust i Breim 1991–2020 (315 m)
| Month | Jan | Feb | Mar | Apr | May | Jun | Jul | Aug | Sep | Oct | Nov | Dec | Year |
|---|---|---|---|---|---|---|---|---|---|---|---|---|---|
| Average precipitation mm (inches) | 192.3 (7.57) | 156.7 (6.17) | 144.4 (5.69) | 87.1 (3.43) | 90.6 (3.57) | 112.6 (4.43) | 109.4 (4.31) | 138.8 (5.46) | 186.6 (7.35) | 184.4 (7.26) | 172.5 (6.79) | 199.8 (7.87) | 1,775.2 (69.9) |
| Average precipitation days (≥ 1.0 mm) | 16 | 15 | 15 | 12 | 13 | 14 | 15 | 16 | 16 | 16 | 15 | 17 | 180 |
Source: Noaa WMO averages 91-2020 Norway

Climate data for Eimhjellen 1991–2020 (170 m)
| Month | Jan | Feb | Mar | Apr | May | Jun | Jul | Aug | Sep | Oct | Nov | Dec | Year |
|---|---|---|---|---|---|---|---|---|---|---|---|---|---|
| Average precipitation mm (inches) | 333.5 (13.13) | 285.9 (11.26) | 264.2 (10.40) | 169.5 (6.67) | 145.7 (5.74) | 137.6 (5.42) | 152.6 (6.01) | 190.2 (7.49) | 275.8 (10.86) | 298.5 (11.75) | 332.7 (13.10) | 377.4 (14.86) | 2,963.6 (116.69) |
| Average precipitation days (≥ 1.0 mm) | 20 | 17 | 18 | 14 | 13 | 14 | 16 | 17 | 17 | 18 | 18 | 20 | 202 |
Source: Noaa WMO averages 91-2020 Norway

== Gallery ==
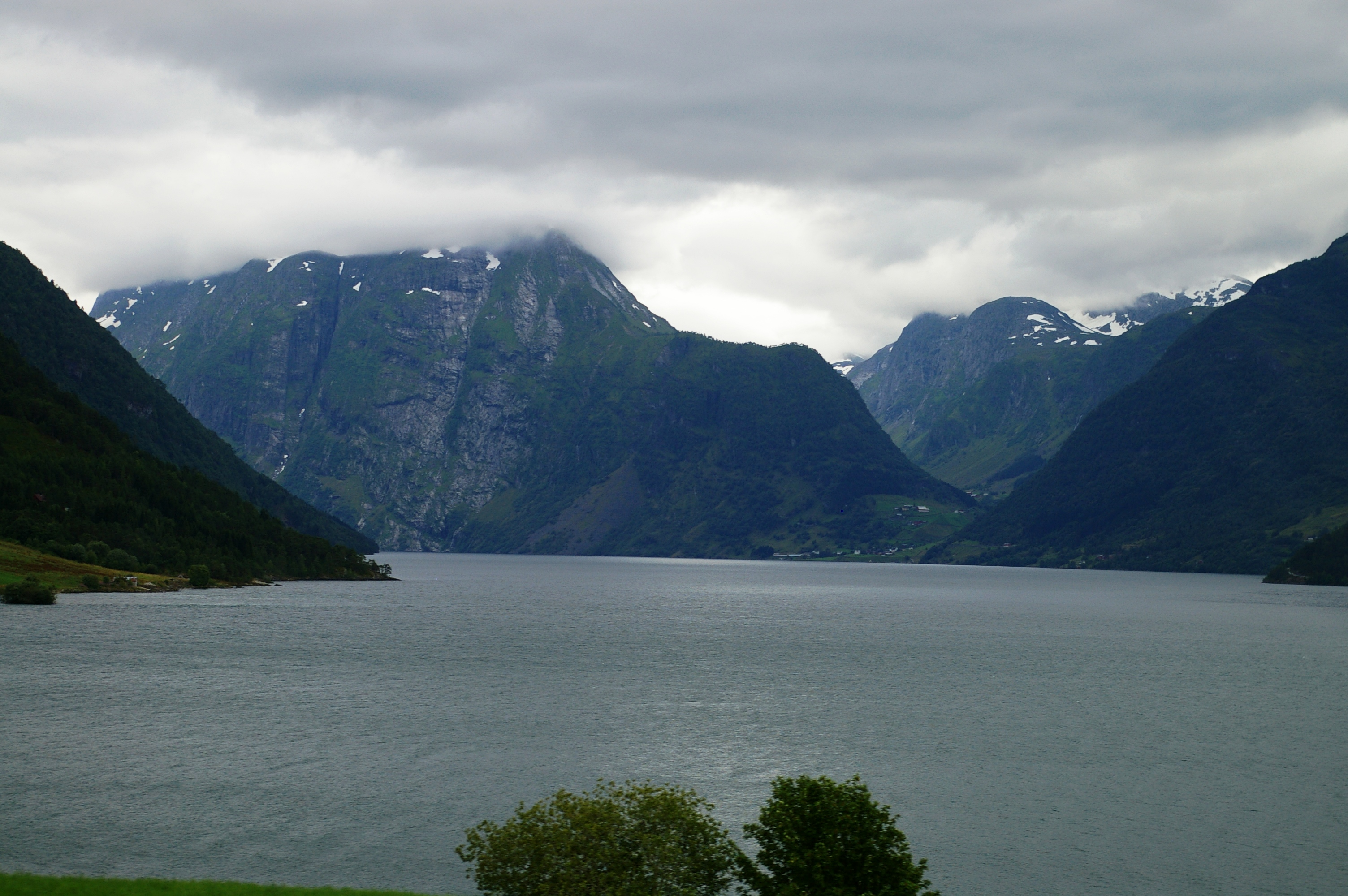
Breimsvatnet lake

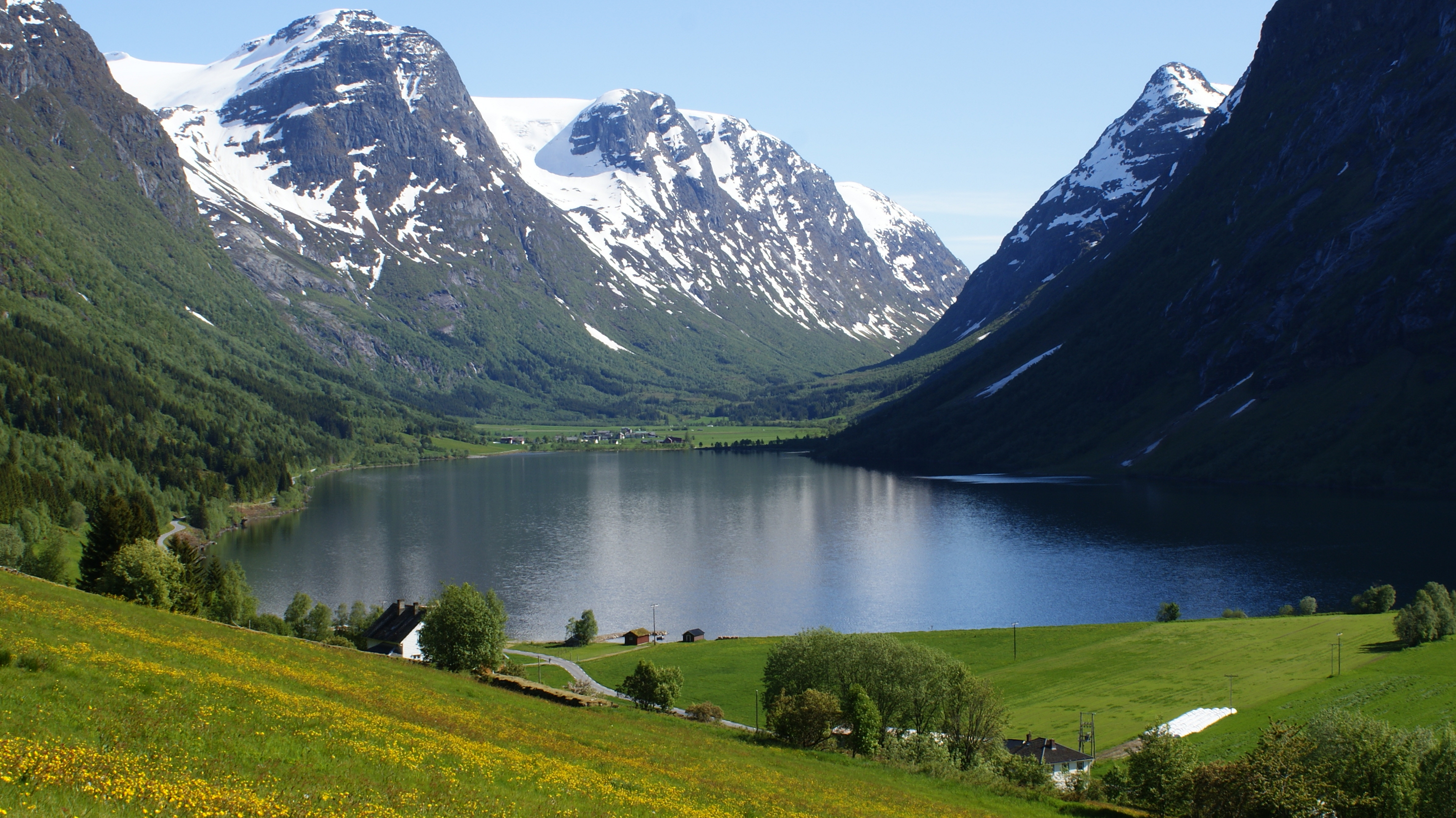
Myklebustdalen valley east of Byrkjelo

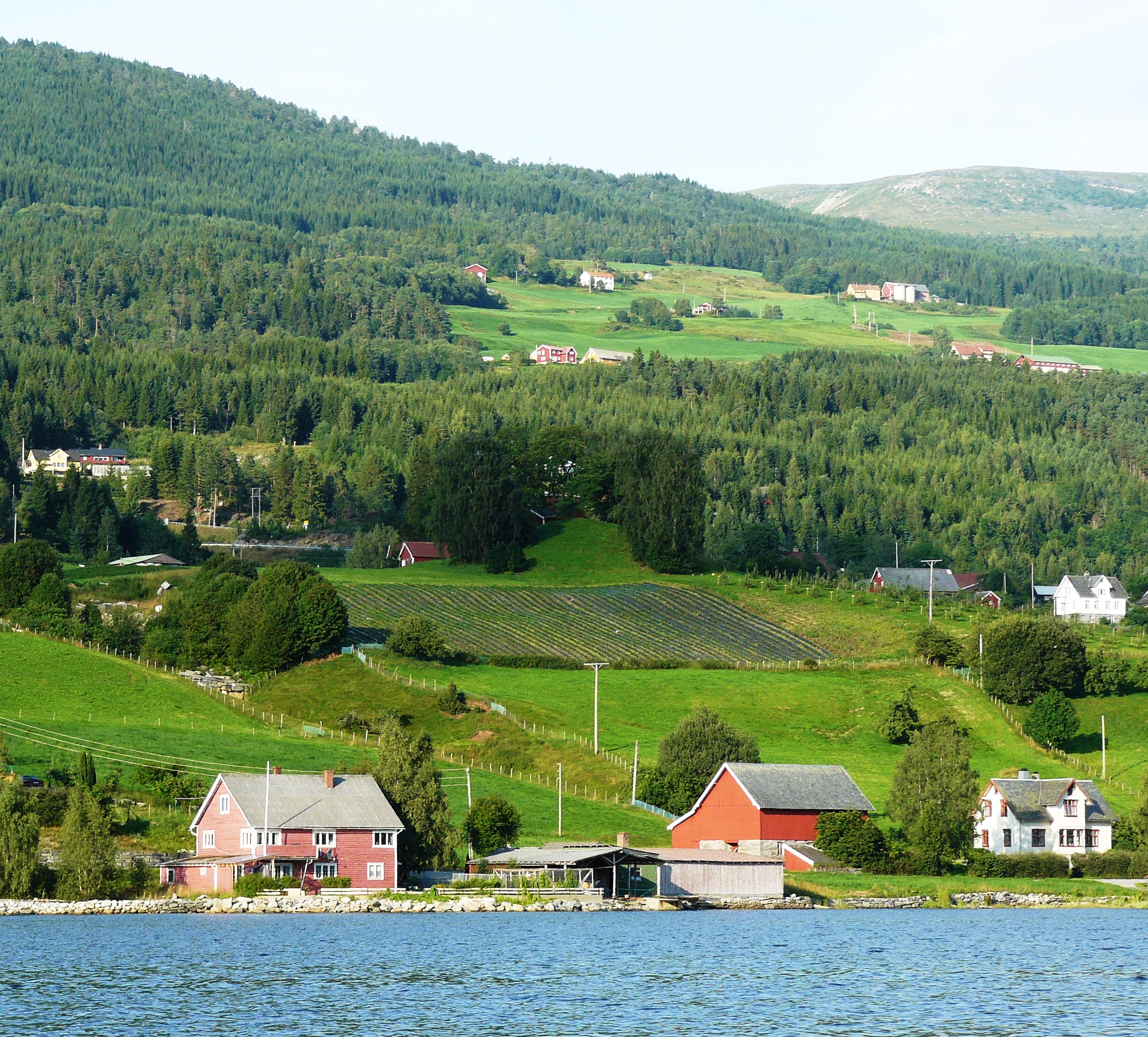
Karnilshaugen from Gloppefjorden

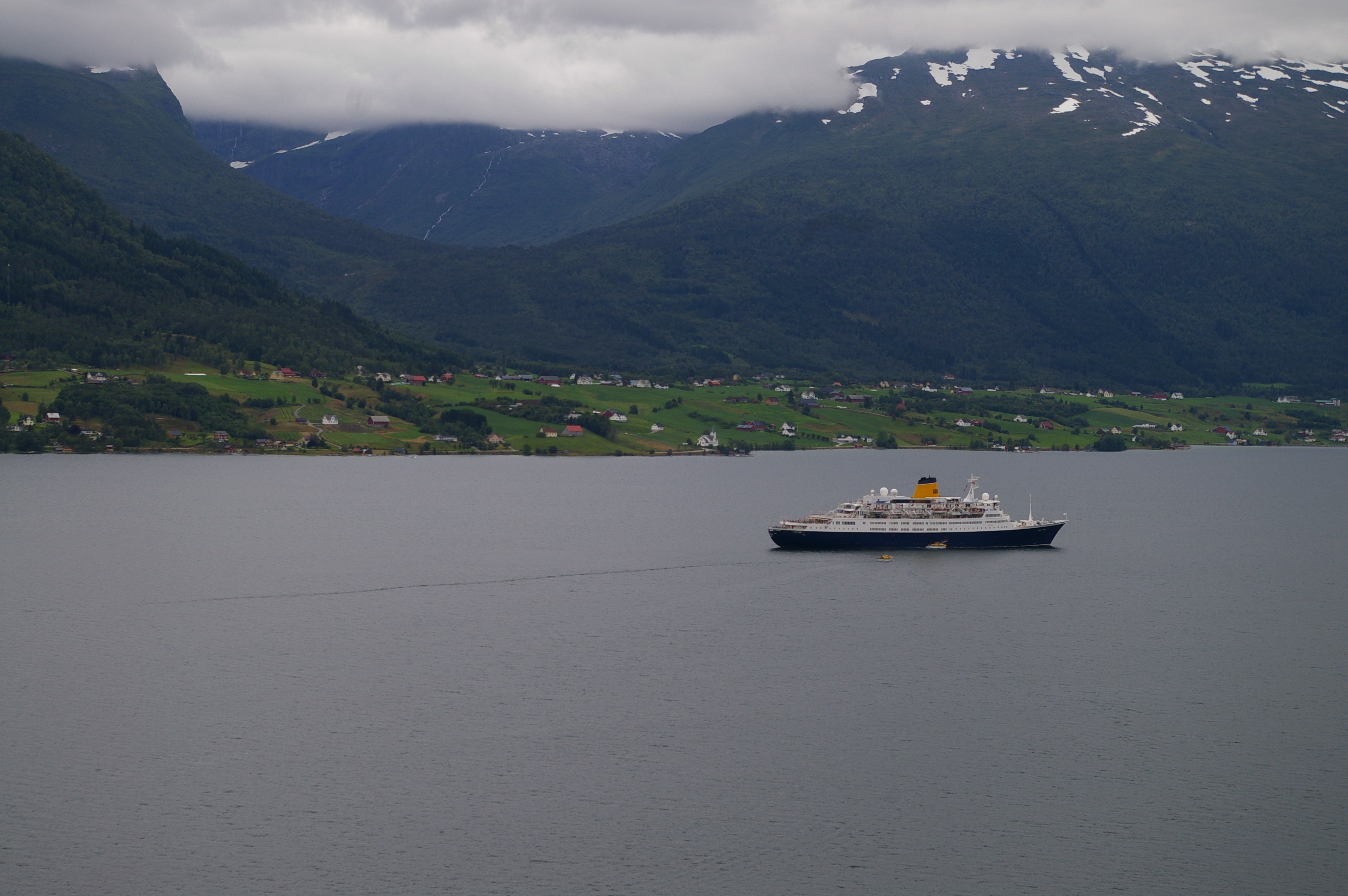
Gloppefjorden

== Economy ==
The dominant trades and industries in Gloppen are agriculture and farming. The Firda Upper Secondary School is located in Sandane. The municipal centre Sandane was also home to a college of secondary education and a branch of Sogn og Fjordane University College which specialized in music therapy (this school closed in 2005).

== Attractions ==
=== Karnilshaugen ===
Gloppen Municipality is the site of Karnils tumulus burial mound (Norwegian: Karnilshaugen) from the Old Norse word haugr meaning mound or barrow. Karnilshaugen or Tinghaugen på Hauge is located on the Hauge farm west of Sandane. Karnilshaugen is probably one of the ten largest mounds in Nordfjord. The burial mound was built on top of Tinghaug, the site of a Thing (assembly). Tinghaug was a place of public gathering, for cultural events and religious actions.

== Notable people ==
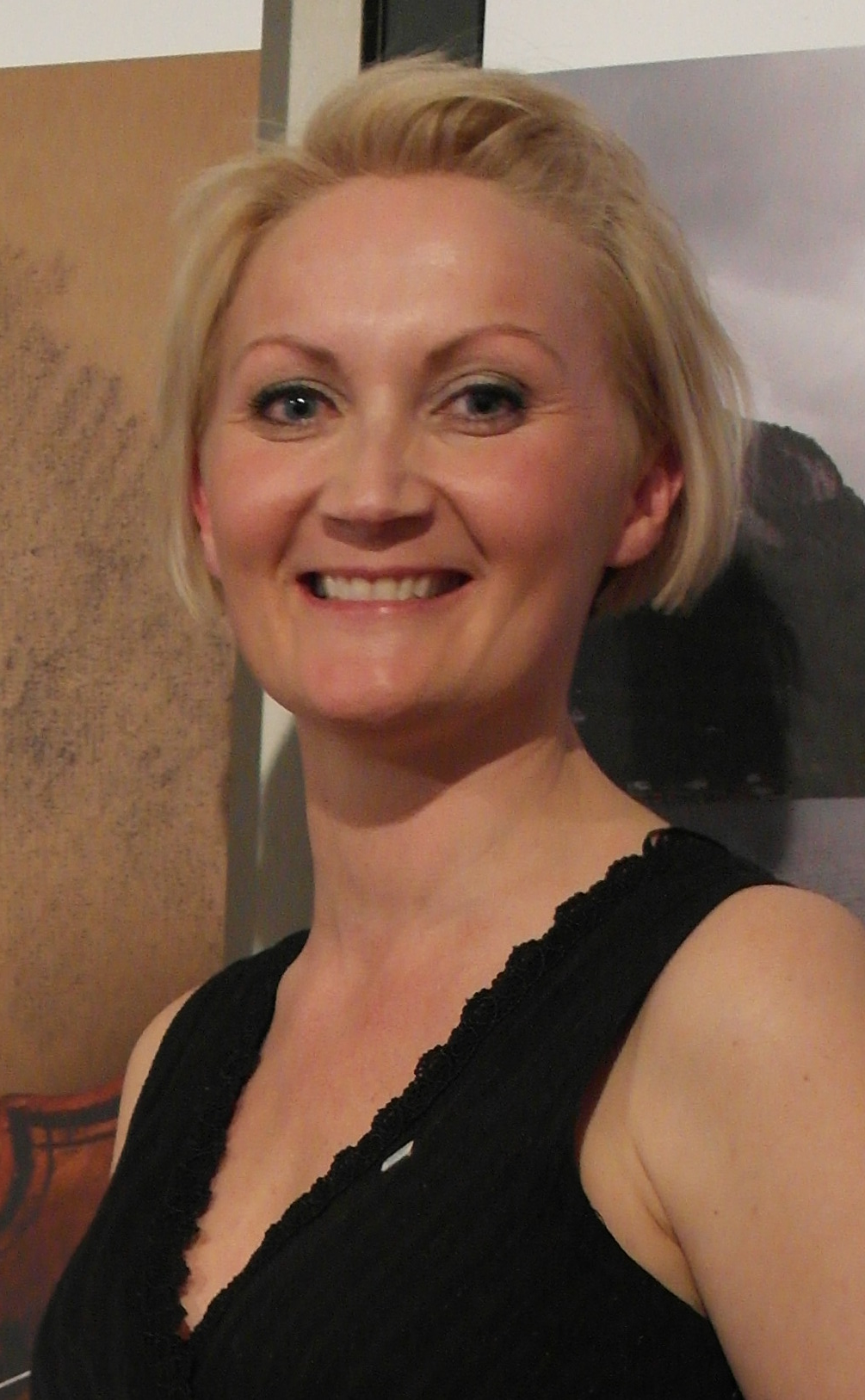
Sigrid Moldestad, 2013

- Knut Gjengedal (1900 in Gloppen – 1973), a schoolteacher, novelist, short story writer, and children's writer.
- John Austrheim (1912 in Gloppen – 1995), a farmer, politician, and mayor of Gloppen from 1955-1962
- Ola M. Hestenes (1919 in Gloppen – 2008), a politician and mayor of Gloppen from 1968-1976
- Nils R. Sandal (born 1950 in Breim), a politician and mayor of Gloppen from 1987–1999
- Sigrid Moldestad (born 1972 in Breim), a folk singer, musician, fiddler, and instrumentalist
- Anne-Pia Nygård (born 1977 in Sandane), a writer

=== Sport ===
- Kjell Ove Hauge (born 1969 in Gloppen), a retired shot putter and discus thrower
- Odd-Bjørn Hjelmeset (born 1971 in Nordfjordeid), a former cross-country skier, bronze medallist in the 2002 Winter Olympics, and team silver medallist at the 2010 Winter Olympics
- Rune Bolseth (born 1980 in Gloppen), a retired footballer with 430 club caps
- Trude Raad (born 1990 in Breim), a deaf track and field athlete
