= Vereide =

Village in Gloppen Municipality, Norway

- Village
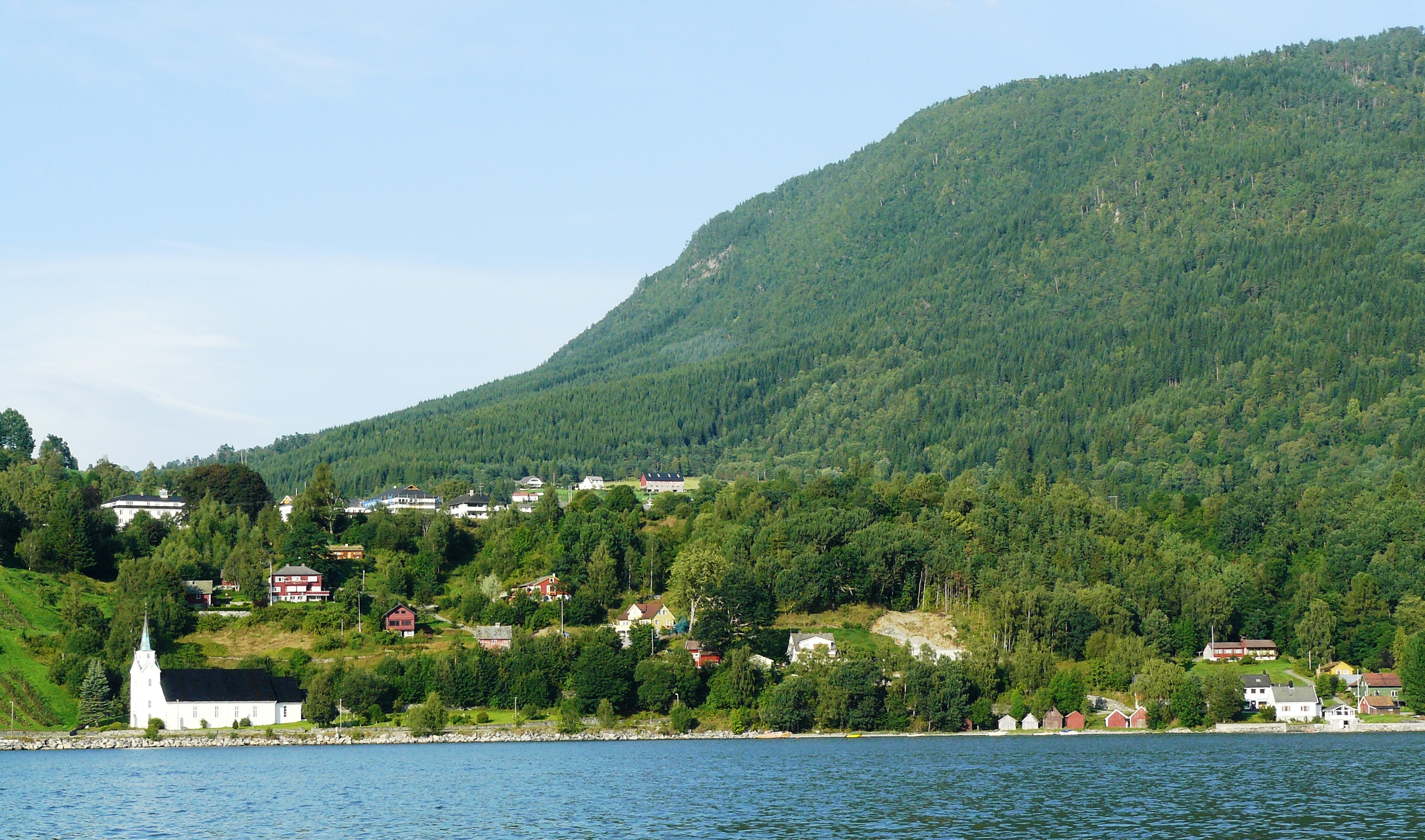
- View of the village
- Interactive map of Vereide
- Location within Vestland Location within Norway
- Coordinates: 61.80962°N 6.1427°E
- Country: Norway
- Region: Western Norway
- County: Vestland
- District: Nordfjord
- Municipality: Gloppen Municipality
- Elevation: 60 m (200 ft)
- Time zone: UTC+01:00 (CET)
  - Summer (DST): UTC+02:00 (CEST)
- Post Code: 6823 Sandane

Vereide is a village in Gloppen Municipality in Vestland county, Norway. The village is located along the central part of the eastern shore of the Gloppefjorden, along the European route E39 highway. It sits about 6 kilometres (3.7 mi) northwest of the municipal center of Sandane and about 4 kilometres (2.5 mi) southeast of Sandane Airport, Anda. Vereide Church is located in this village, right on the shore of the fjord.

There is some development right along the fjord, but due to the relatively steep hill, most development is located higher up on rather flat area further inland. Nordfjord folkehøgskule, a Christian folk high school, is located in Vereide.

There are many old archaeological findings in the Vereide area, including burial mounds that date back to the year 300 AD. In 1993, when construction was being done on the European route E39 highway through Vereide, an ancient burial site was discovered. There is now a memorial stone and marker at that site.

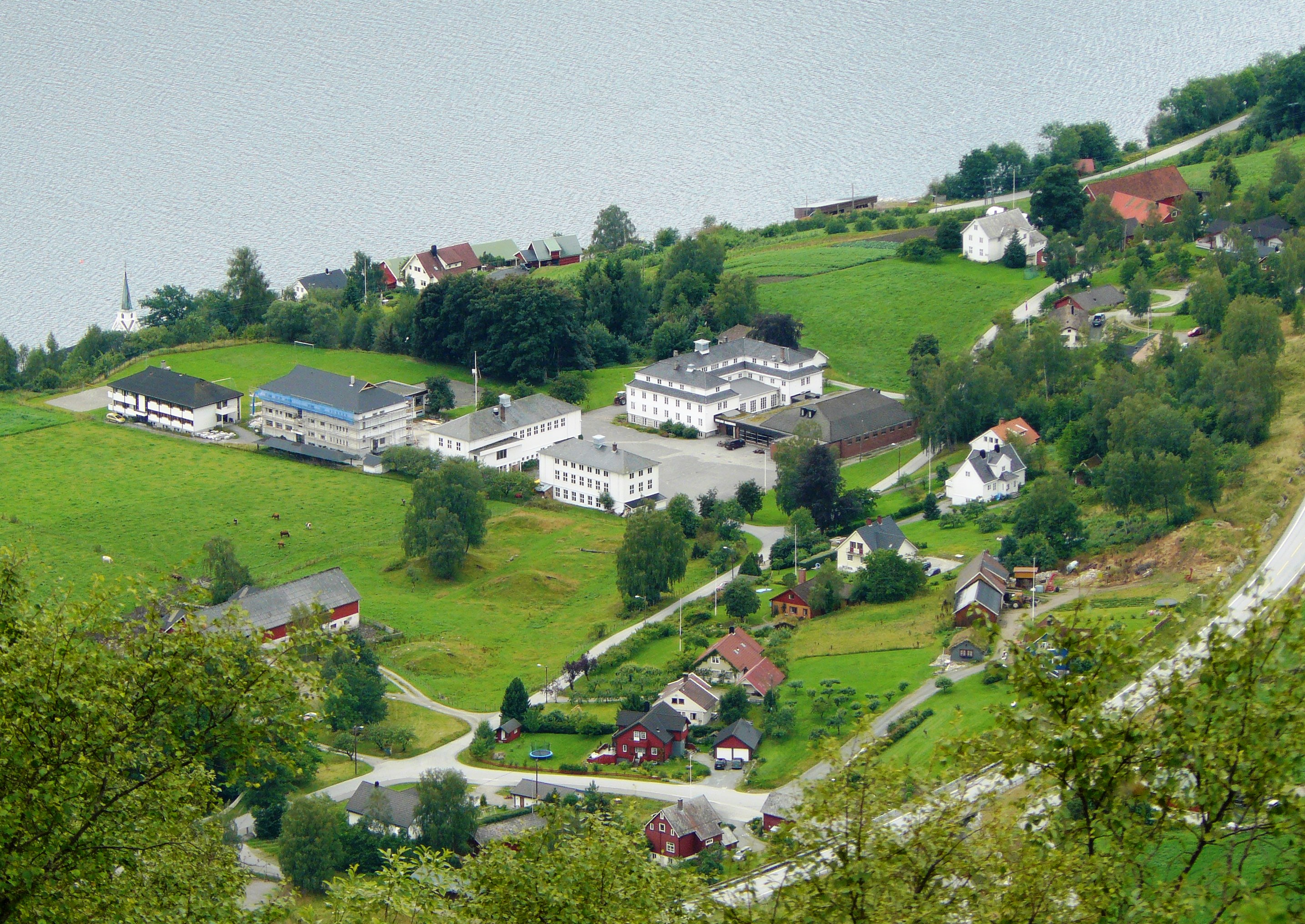
View of the local folk high school in Vereide

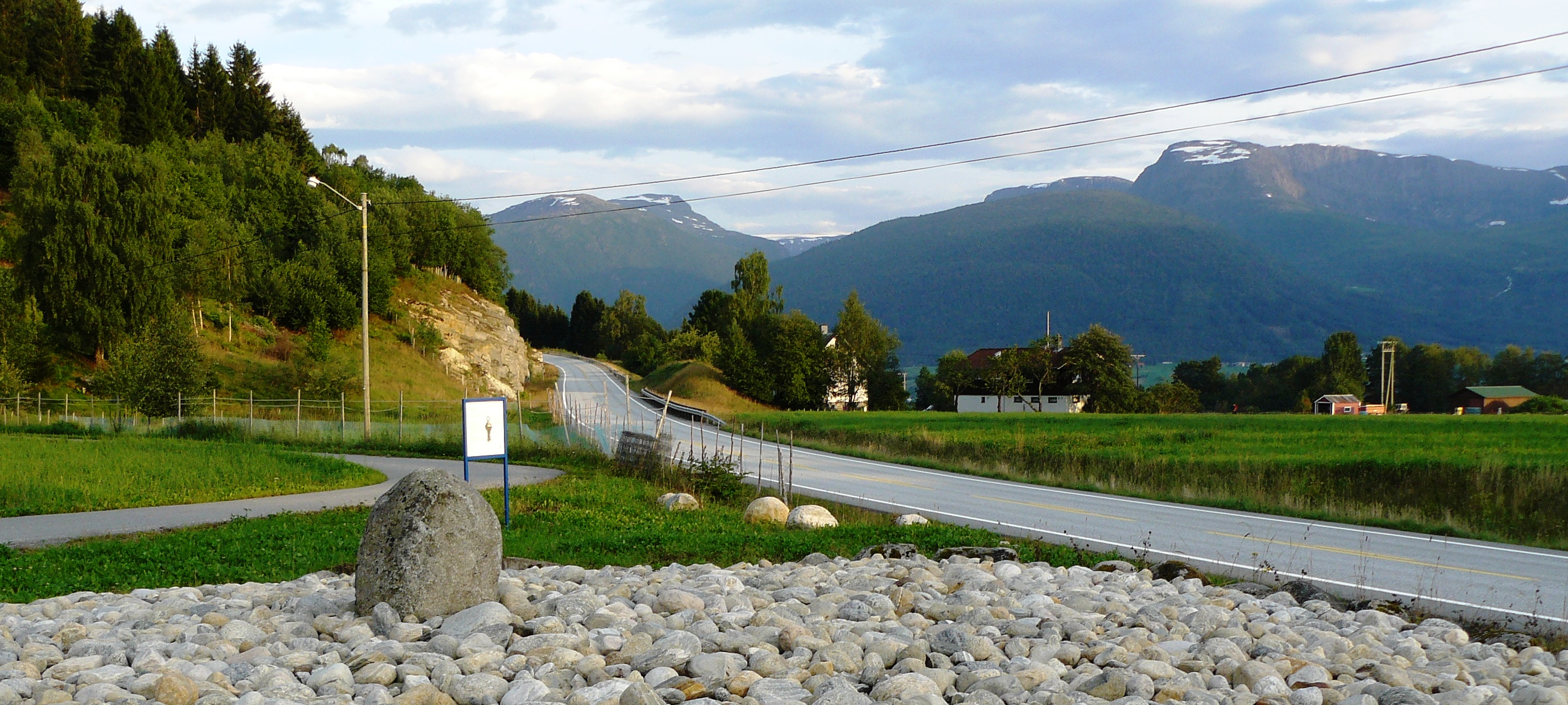
View of an archaeological dig site

== Climate ==
Climate data for Sandane 1991–2020 (51 m)
Month	Jan	Feb	Mar	Apr	May	Jun	Jul	Aug	Sep	Oct	Nov	Dec	Year
Mean daily maximum °C (°F)	3.4 (38.1)	3.5 (38.3)	5.8 (42.4)	10 (50)	14.2 (57.6)	17.3 (63.1)	19.5 (67.1)	18.6 (65.5)	14.9 (58.8)	9.7 (49.5)	5.9 (42.6)	3.5 (38.3)	10.5 (50.9)
Daily mean °C (°F)	1.1 (34.0)	0.7 (33.3)	2.5 (36.5)	6 (43)	9.7 (49.5)	13 (55)	15.4 (59.7)	14.8 (58.6)	11.4 (52.5)	6.6 (43.9)	3.3 (37.9)	1.2 (34.2)	7.1 (44.8)
Mean daily minimum °C (°F)	−1.7 (28.9)	−2.1 (28.2)	−0.4 (31.3)	2.4 (36.3)	5.4 (41.7)	9.1 (48.4)	11.6 (52.9)	11.2 (52.2)	8.2 (46.8)	3.8 (38.8)	0.8 (33.4)	−1.5 (29.3)	3.9 (39.0)
Average precipitation mm (inches)	155 (6.1)	122 (4.8)	110 (4.3)	66 (2.6)	62 (2.4)	69 (2.7)	71 (2.8)	96 (3.8)	129 (5.1)	153 (6.0)	150 (5.9)	174 (6.9)	1,357 (53.4)
Average precipitation days (≥ 1.0 mm)	16	15	15	12	10	11	12	15	14	15	15	17	167
Source 1: yr.no/Met.no
Source 2: Noaa WMO averages 91-2020 Norway
