= Vereide Church =

Church in Vestland, Norway

- Vereide kyrkje
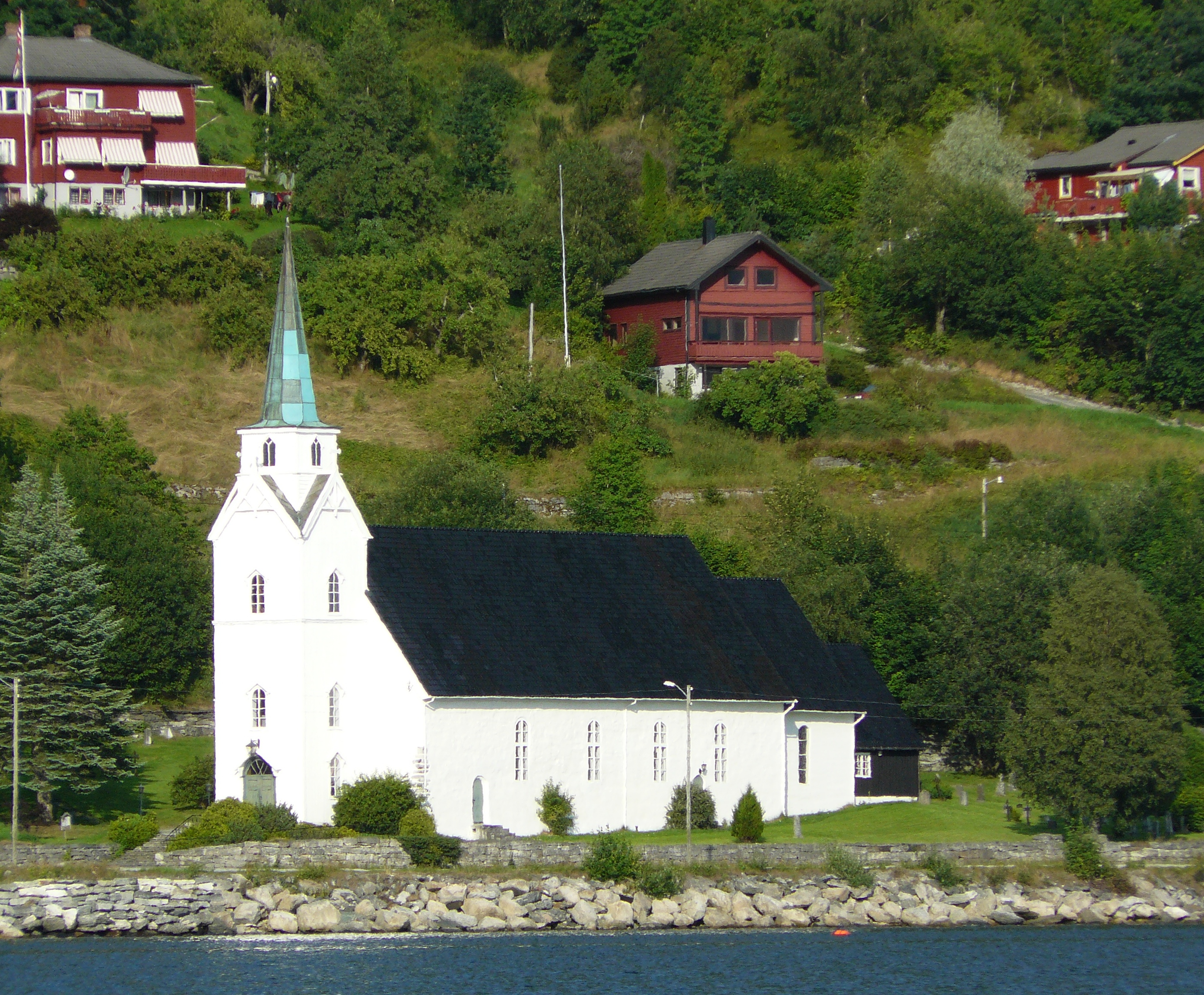
- View of the church
- Vereide Church
- 61°48′29″N 6°08′31″E
- Location: Gloppen Municipality, Vestland
- Country: Norway
- Denomination: Church of Norway
- Previous denomination: Catholic Church
- Churchmanship: Evangelical Lutheran

History
- Status: Parish church
- Founded: 12th century
- Events: 1631: Major renovation

Architecture
- Functional status: Active
- Architectural type: Long church
- Completed: c. 1163 (863 years ago)

Specifications
- Capacity: 460
- Materials: Stone

Administration
- Diocese: Bjørgvin bispedømme
- Deanery: Nordfjord prosti
- Parish: Gloppen
- Norwegian Cultural Heritage Site
- Type: Church
- Status: Automatically protected
- ID: 85807

Vereide Church (Norwegian: Vereide kyrkje) is a medieval parish church of the Church of Norway in Gloppen Municipality in Vestland county, Norway. It is the only stone church in the Nordfjord region. It is located in the village of Vereide, along the eastern coast of the Gloppefjorden. It is one of the four churches for the Gloppen parish which is part of the Nordfjord prosti (deanery) in the Diocese of Bjørgvin. The white, stone church was built in a long church style in the 12th century by an unknown architect. The church seats about 460 people.

== History ==
The earliest existing historical records of the church date back to the year 1303, but the church was not new at that time. The church is a stone long church that was likely built in the 12th century, possibly in 1163 (this year is inscribed in an archway within the building). It originally had a rectangular nave and a narrower chancel with a lower roof line. This is the oldest surviving stone church in the Nordfjord region of Norway, and it was one of the original four churches built in the Nordfjord-Sunnfjord region (with the others being Eid Church, Kinn Church, and Askvoll Church). The church was extensively remodeled in 1631 and a few times since then.

In 1814, this church served as an election church (Norwegian: valgkirke). Together with more than 300 other parish churches across Norway, it was a polling station for elections to the 1814 Norwegian Constituent Assembly which wrote the Constitution of Norway. This was Norway's first national election. Each church parish was a constituency that elected people called "electors" who later met together in each county to elect the representatives for the assembly that was to meet at Eidsvoll Manor later that year.

In 1861, larger windows were installed. In 1879, a new wooden church porch with a tower was added. In 1904, the long-disused medieval soapstone baptismal font was found and re-installed in the church. It is the only remaining item of medieval origin that is still in use in the church. In 1931, a new chancel and sacristy were built. During the 1960s, the sacristy was enlarged.

== Media gallery ==
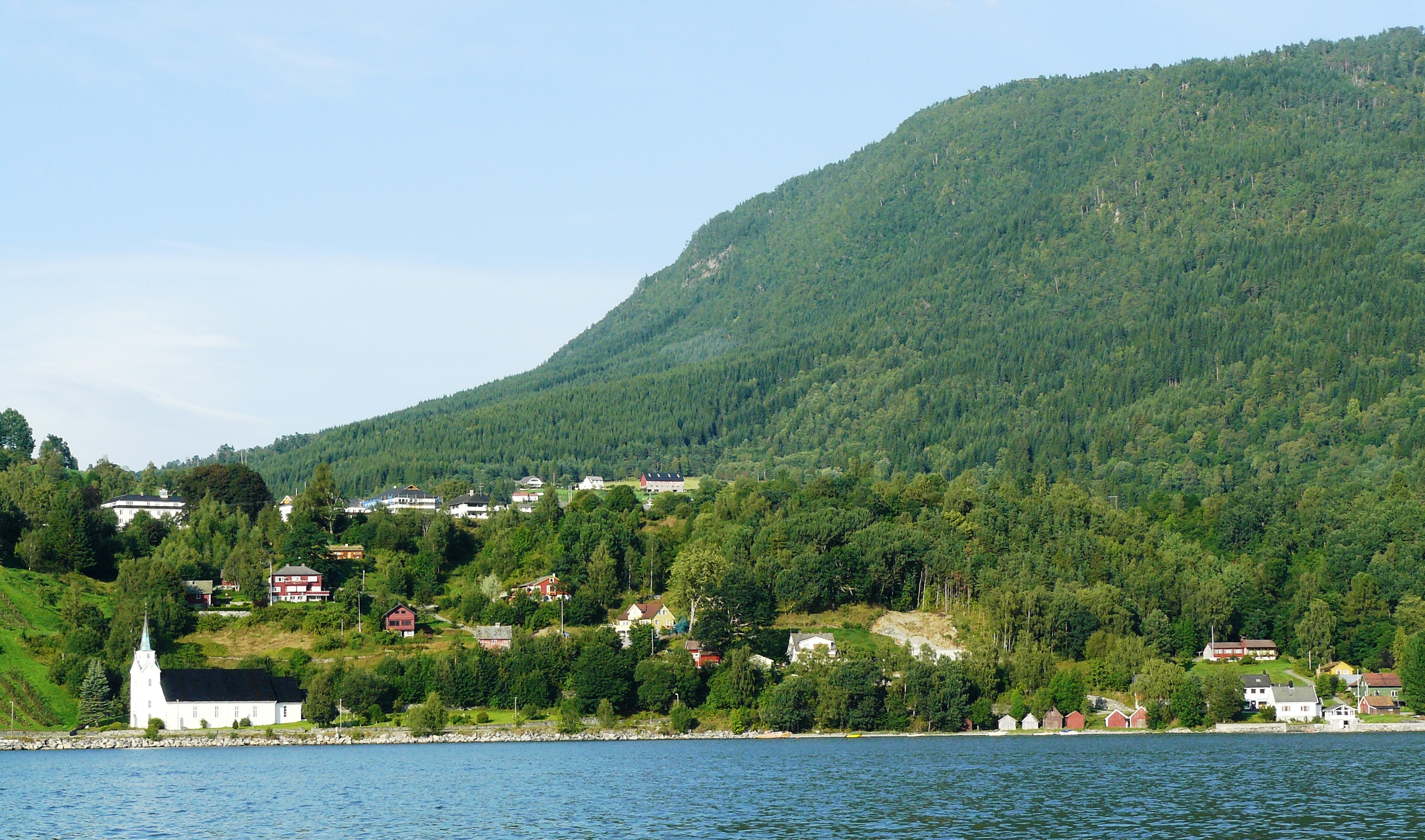
Church location

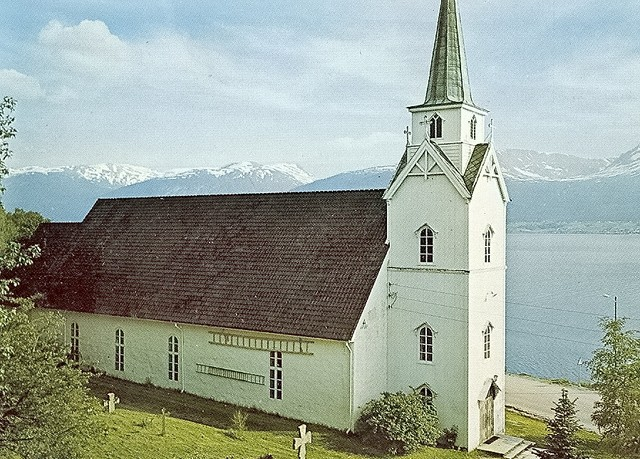
Exterior

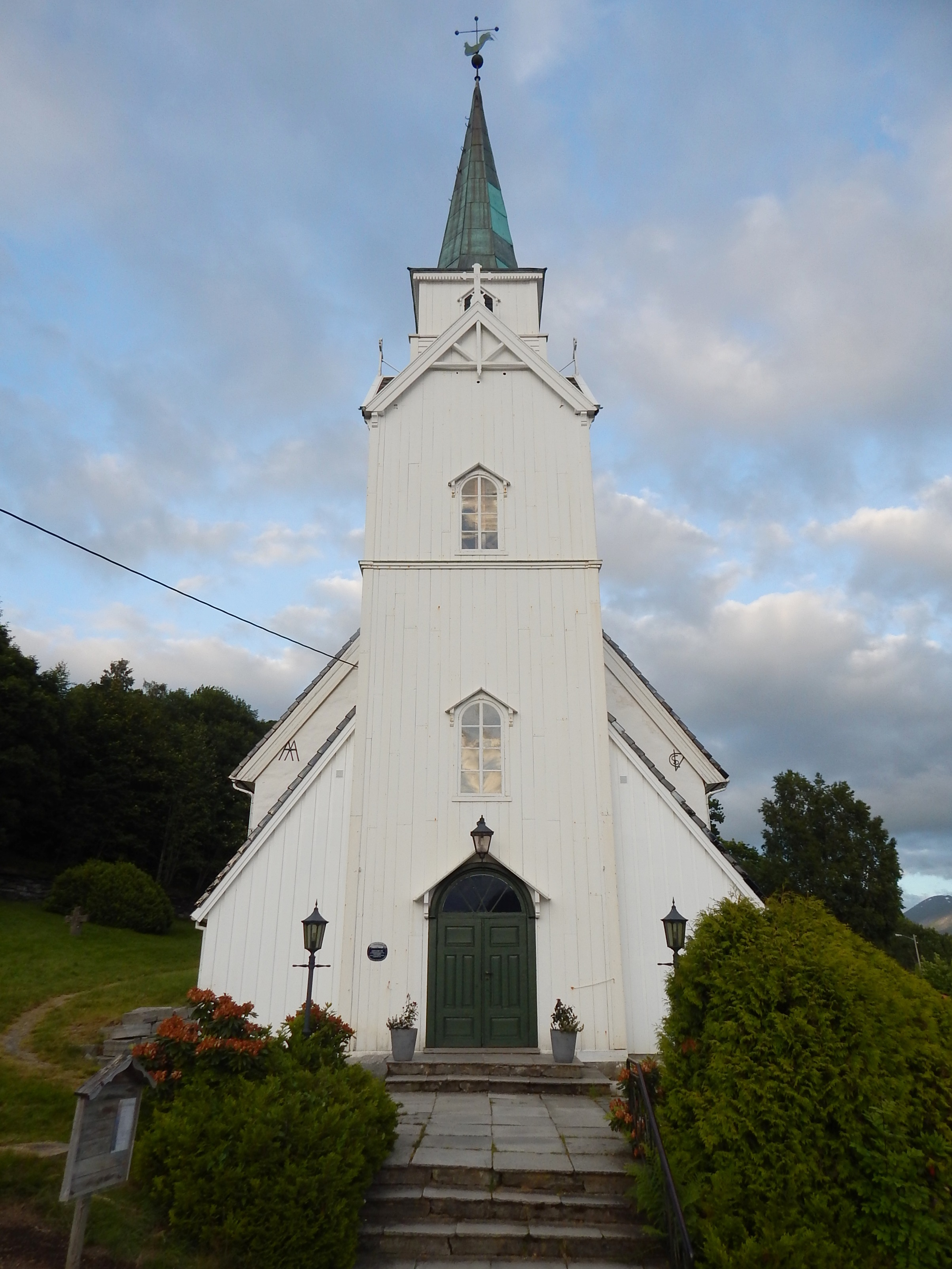
Front

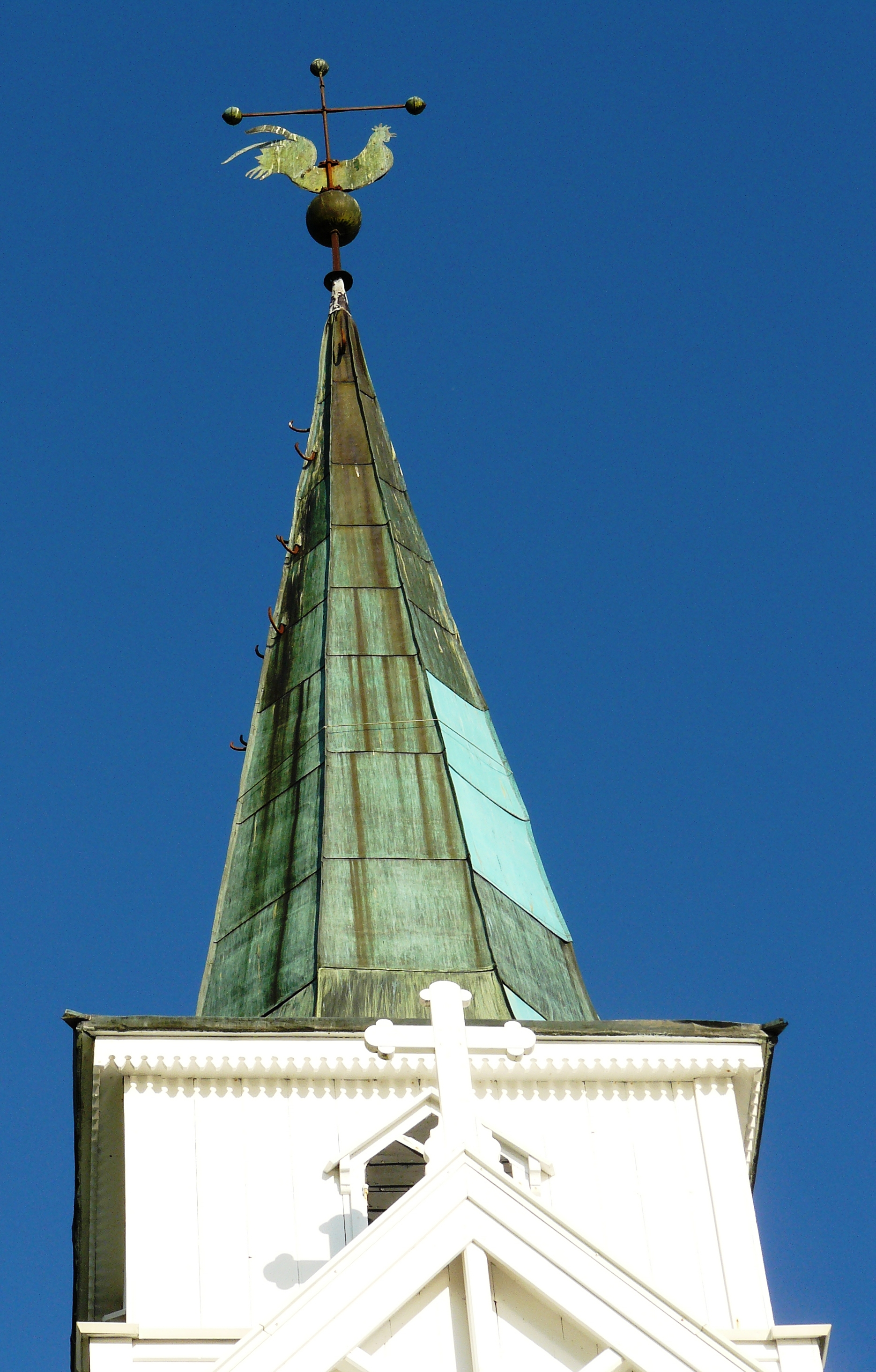
Steeple

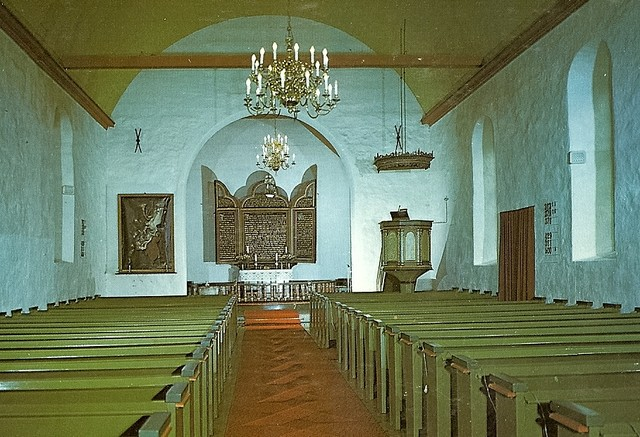
Church altar

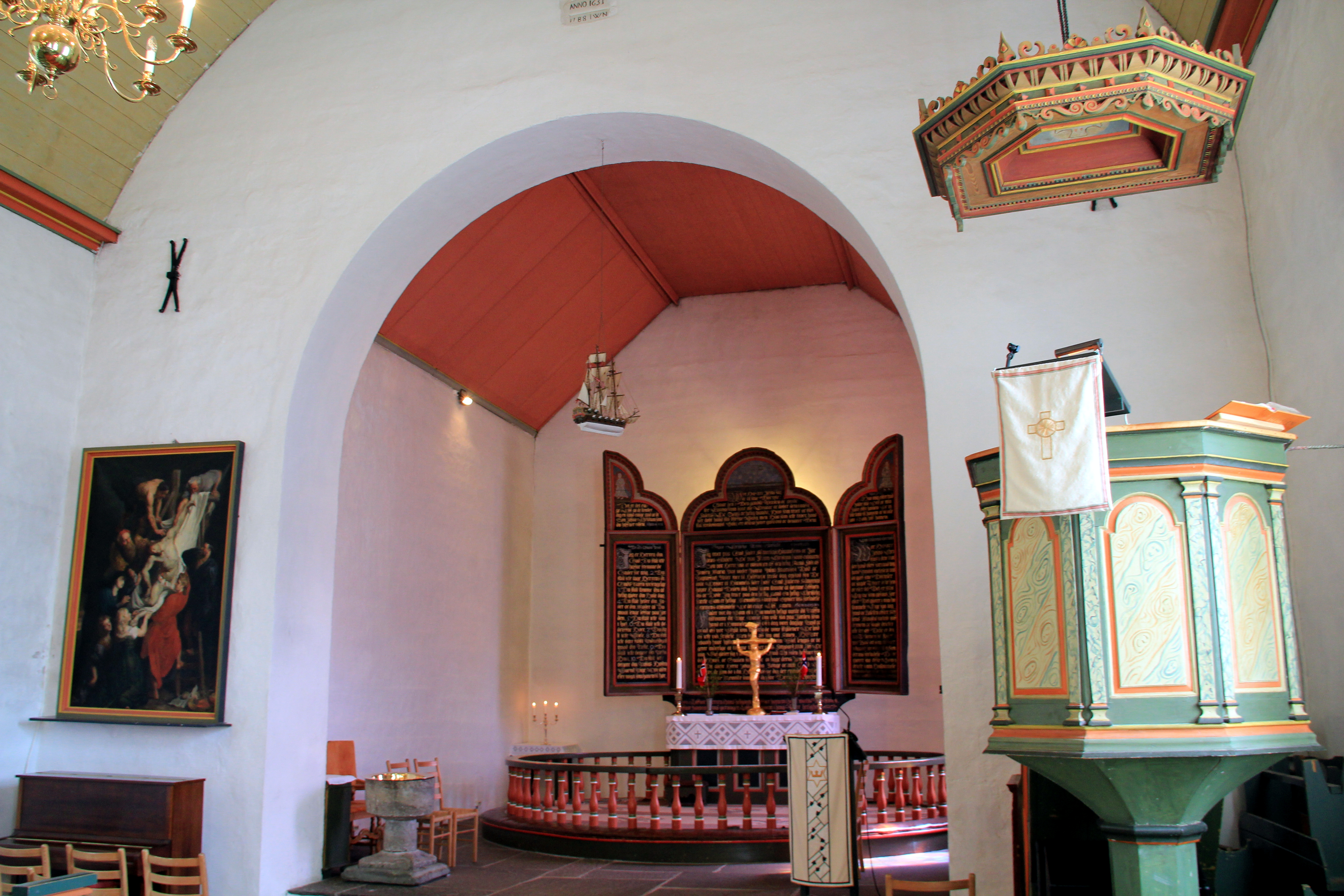
Church interior

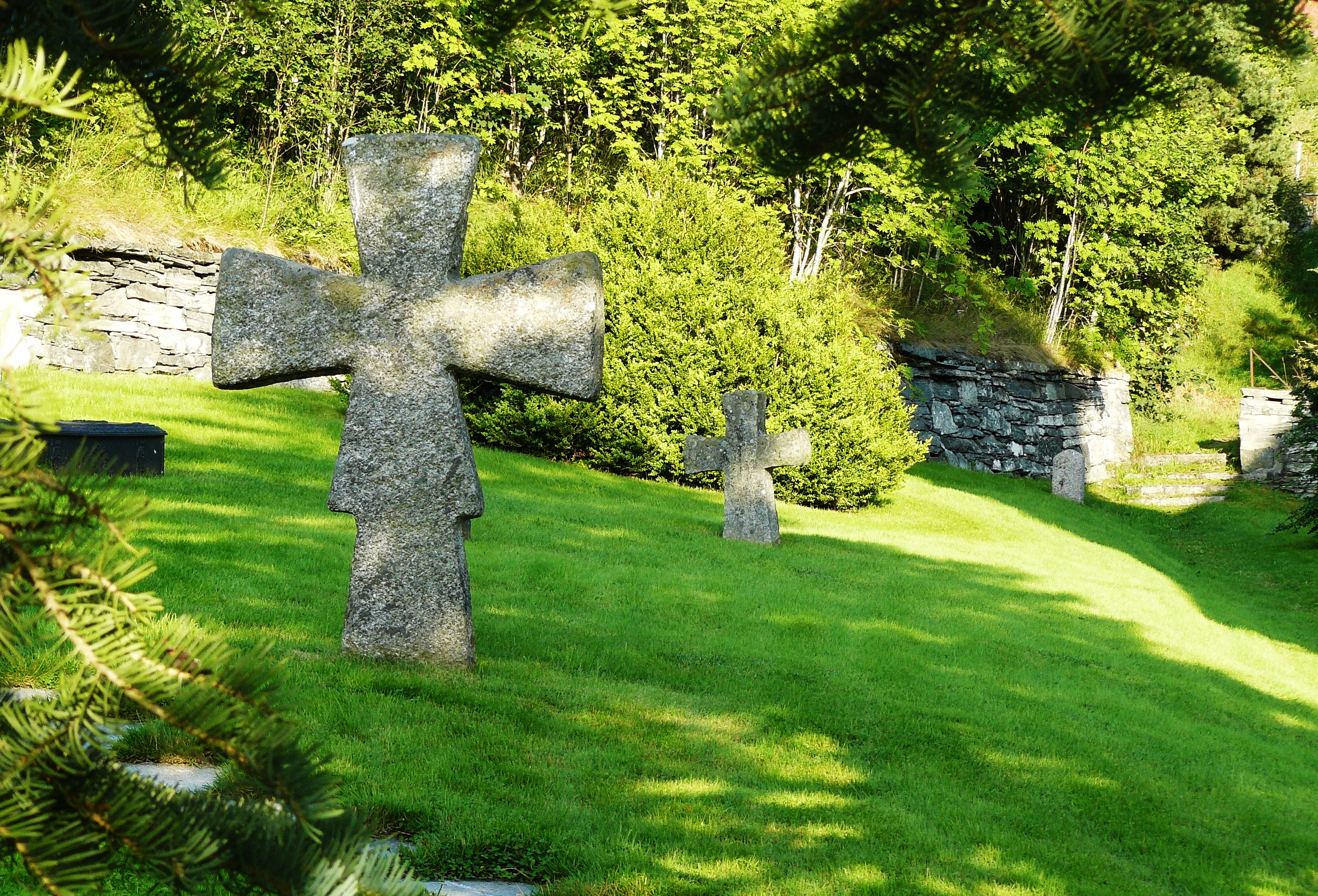
Church stonecross

== See also ==
- List of churches in Bjørgvin
