= Breimsvatnet =

Lake in Vestland, Norway

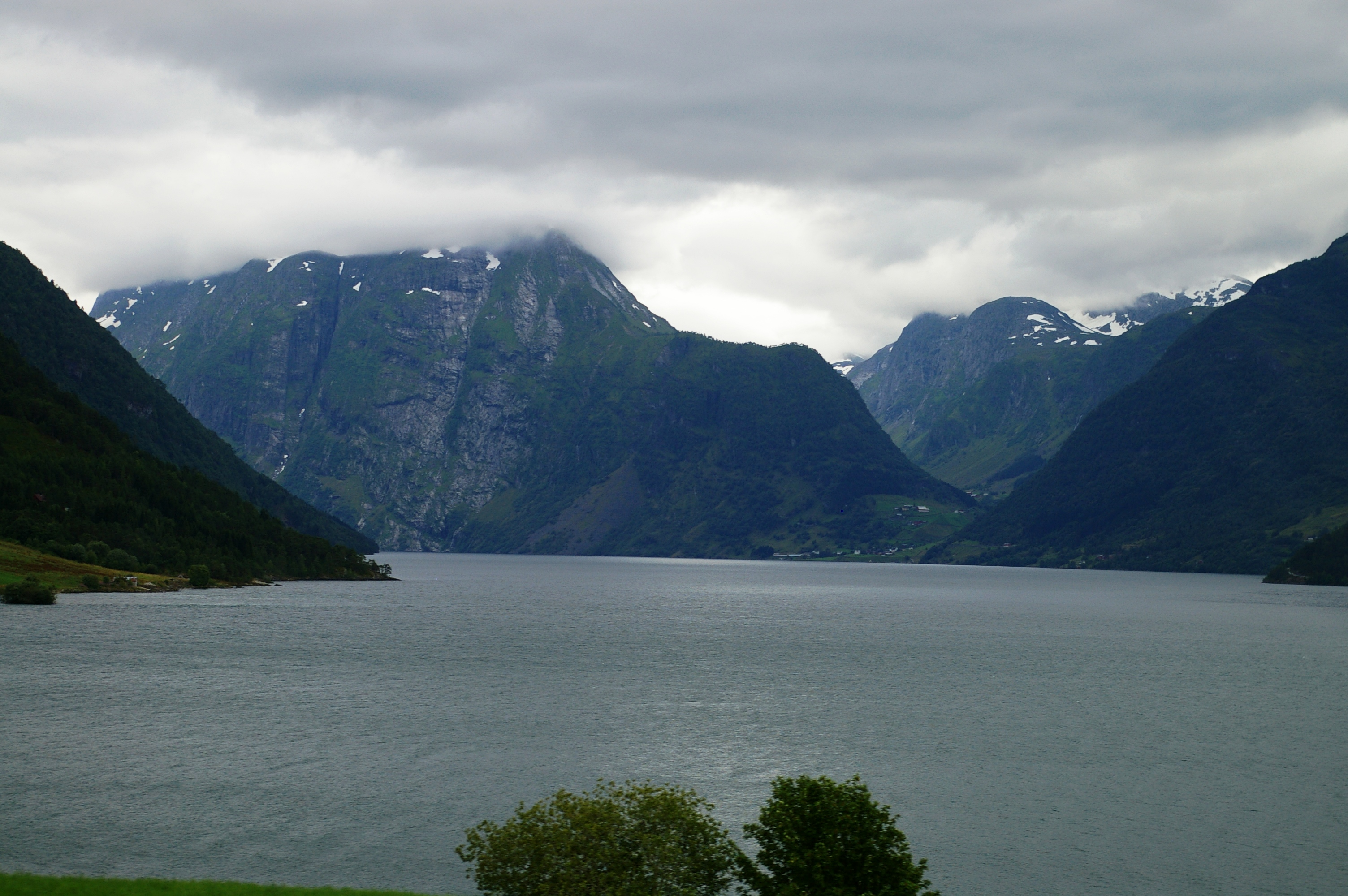
- Interactive map of the lake
- Location: Gloppen and Sunnfjord, Vestland
- Coordinates: 61.63208°N 6.43932°E
- Type: Glacial fjord lake
- Primary inflows: Kandalselva, Neselva, Paulselva, Storelva and Årdalselva
- Primary outflows: Gloppeelva river
- Catchment area: 586.82 km^{2} (226.57 sq mi)
- Basin countries: Norway
- Max. length: 18 kilometres (11 mi)
- Max. width: 2.7 kilometres (1.7 mi)
- Surface area: 22.67 km^{2} (8.75 sq mi)
- Average depth: 129 m (423 ft)
- Max. depth: 278 m (912 ft)
- Water volume: 2.92 km^{3} (0.70 cu mi)
- Shore length^{1}: 43 kilometres (27 mi)
- Surface elevation: 61 metres (200 ft)
- References: NVE
- ^{1} Shore length is not a well-defined measure.

Breimsvatnet is a lake in Vestland county, Norway. It is located mostly in Gloppen Municipality, but the southern end of the lake lies in Sunnfjord Municipality. At 22.67 square kilometres (8.75 sq mi), it is the largest lake in Gloppen (followed by the lake Eimhjellevatnet). The European route E39 highway runs along the north end of the lake, connecting the two nearby areas of Sandane and Byrkjelo. On the shores of the 17-kilometre (11 mi) long lake lie several villages including Re and Kandal. The lake flows into the Gloppenelva river which flows into the Gloppefjorden, an arm of the Nordfjorden. Historically, the area surrounding the lake was part of the old Breim Municipality, which existed from 1886 until 1964.

== See also ==
- List of lakes in Norway
