= Byrkjelo =

Village in Gloppen Municipality, Norway

- Village
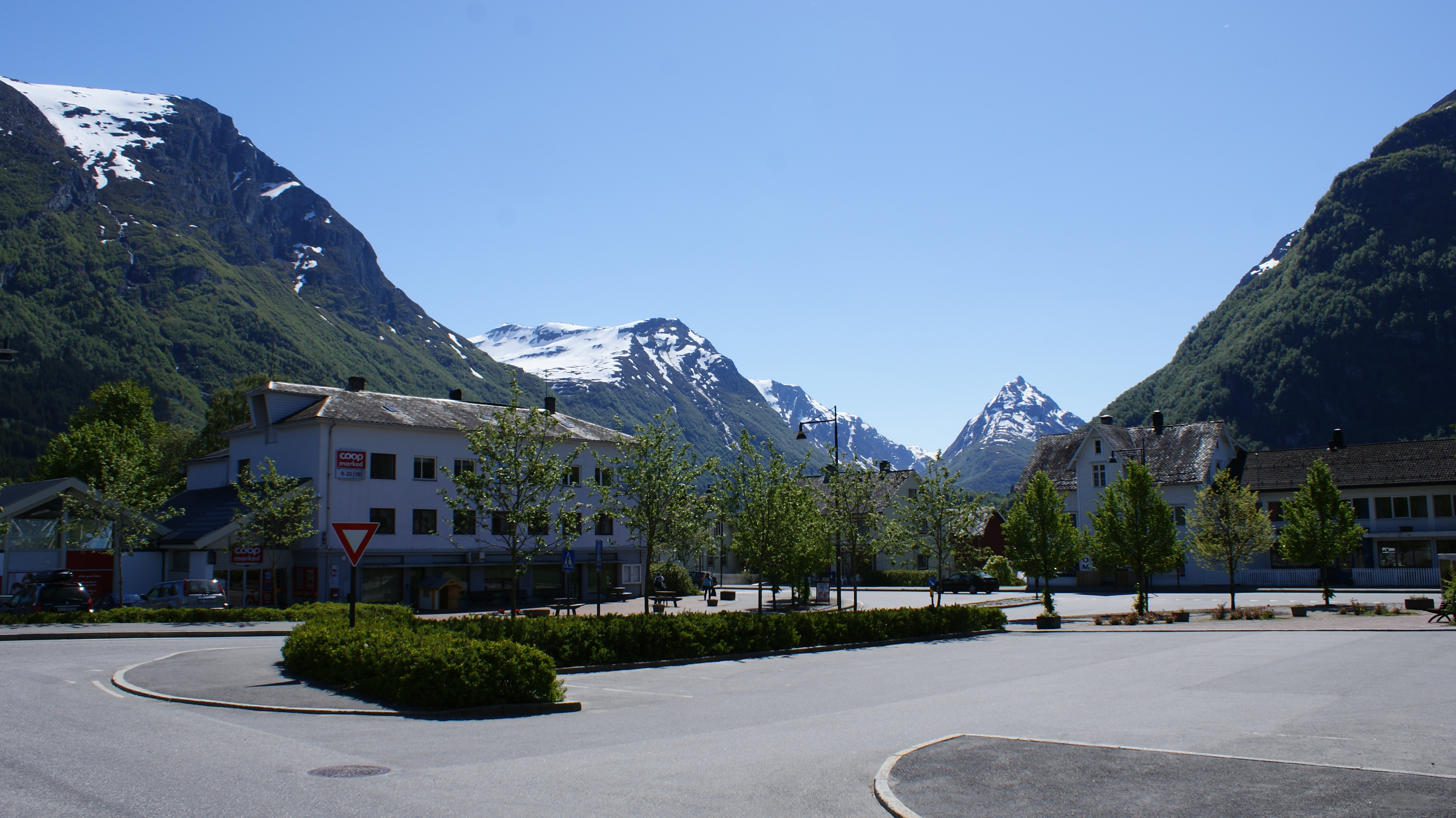
- View of Byrkjelo
- Interactive map of Byrkjelo
- Location within Vestland Location within Norway
- Coordinates: 61.73297°N 6.50528°E
- Country: Norway
- Region: Western Norway
- County: Vestland
- District: Nordfjord
- Municipality: Gloppen Municipality

Area
  - Total: 0.55 km^{2} (0.21 sq mi)
- Elevation: 136 m (446 ft)

Population (2024)
  - Total: 353
  - Density: 642/km^{2} (1,660/sq mi)
- Time zone: UTC+01:00 (CET)
  - Summer (DST): UTC+02:00 (CEST)
- Post Code: 6826 Byrkjelo

Byrkjelo is a village in Gloppen Municipality in Vestland county, Norway. It is located about halfway between the villages of Sandane (in Gloppen Municipality) and Skei (in Sunnfjord Municipality) along the European route E39 highway. The village of Re lies about 5 kilometres (3.1 mi) to the west and the small village of Egge lies about 5 kilometres (3.1 mi) to the south.

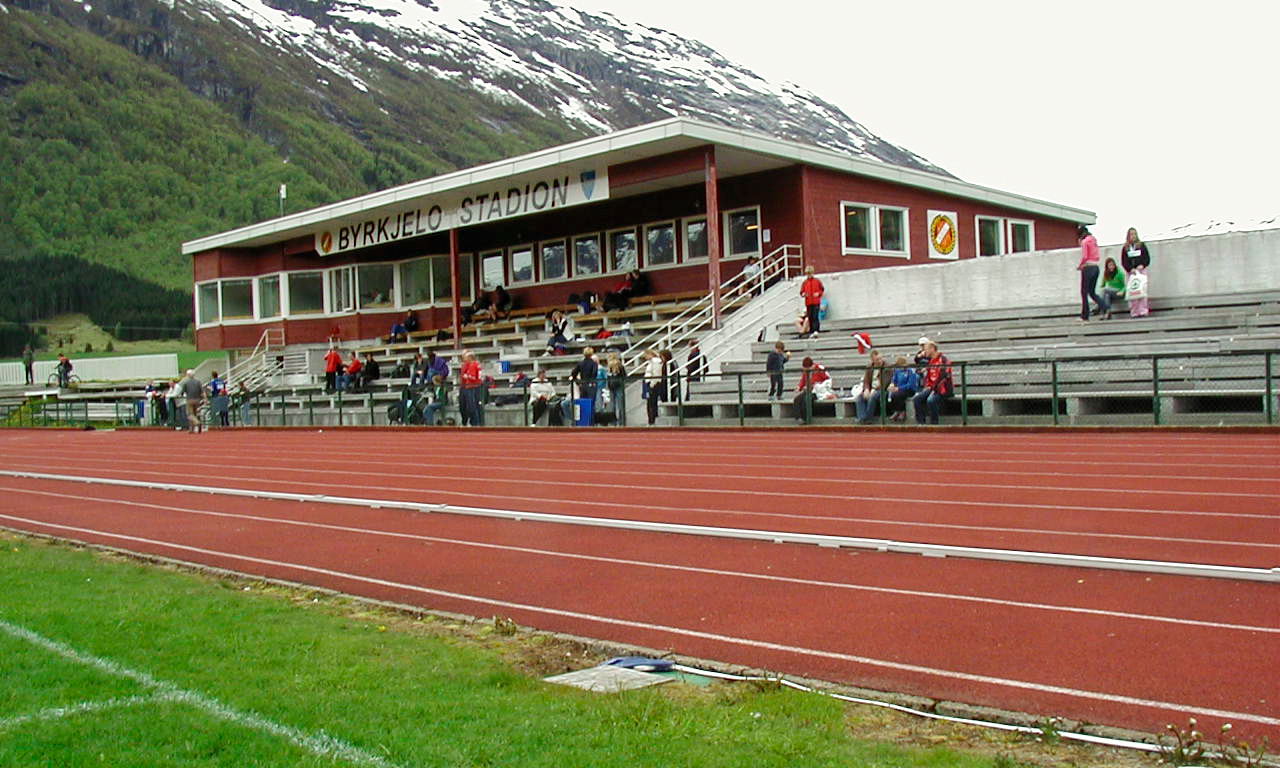
View of Byrkjelo Stadium

The 0.55-square-kilometre (140-acre) village has a population (2024) of 353 and a population density of 642 inhabitants per square kilometre (1,660/sq mi).

Byrkjelo is located near the great Jostedalsbreen National Park, the Myklebustbreen glacier, and the lake Breimsvatn. Byrkjelo Stadium is used for several large athletic competitions each year. One of the largest dairy factories in Western Norway is located in Byrkjelo. It is operated by Tine.
