= Sørstranda, Vestland =

Village in Gloppen Municipality, Norway

Sørstranda Rygg
- Village
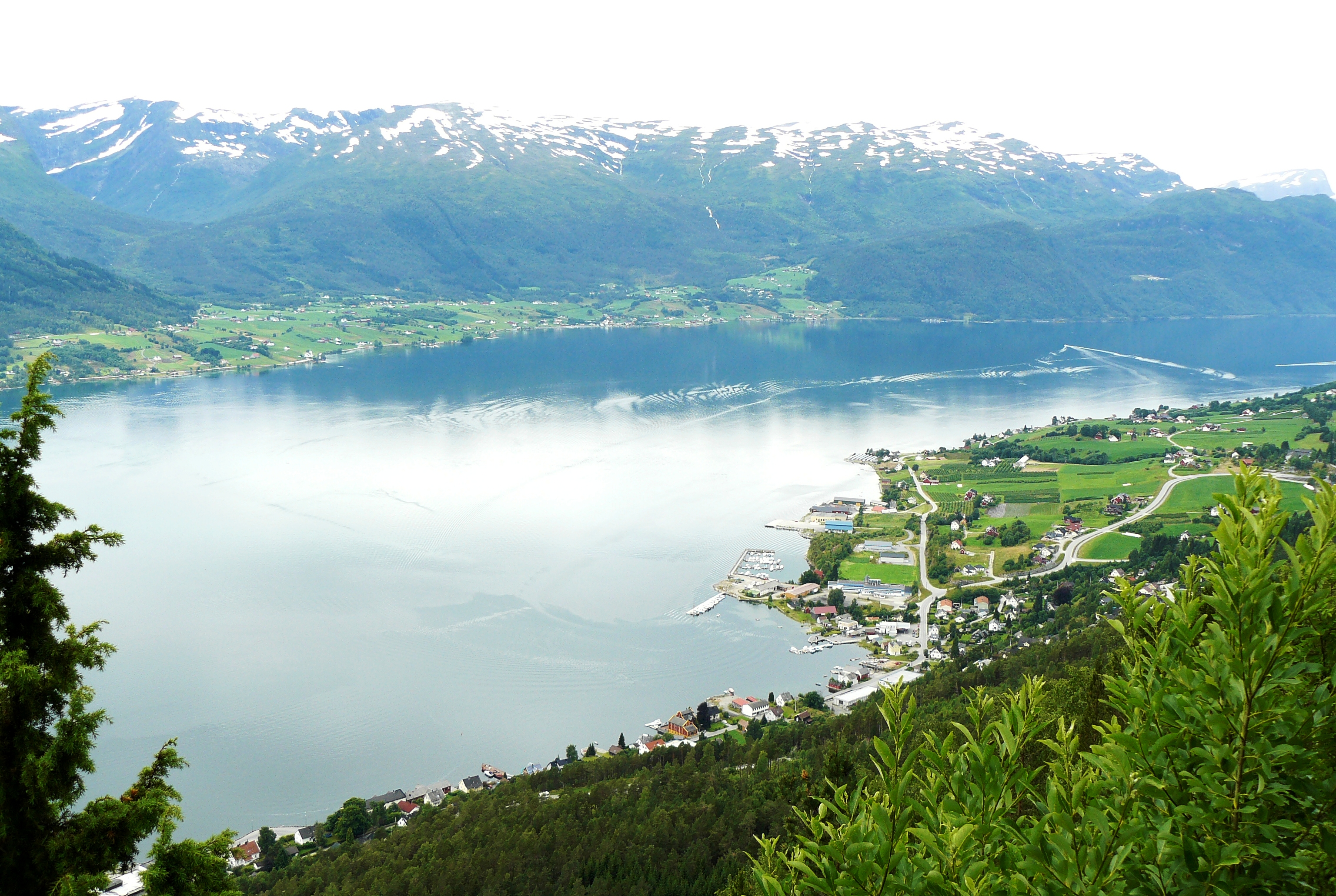
- View of the village on the far side of the fjord
- Interactive map of Sørstranda; Rygg
- Location within Vestland Location within Norway
- Coordinates: 61.77826°N 6.12425°E
- Country: Norway
- Region: Western Norway
- County: Vestland
- District: Nordfjord
- Municipality: Gloppen Municipality
- Elevation: 3 m (9.8 ft)
- Time zone: UTC+01:00 (CET)
  - Summer (DST): UTC+02:00 (CEST)
- Post Code: 6823 Sandane

Sørstranda or Rygg is a village in Gloppen Municipality in Vestland county, Norway. The village is located on the southwestern shore of the Gloppefjorden. The village sits about 5 kilometres (3.1 mi) west of the municipal centre of Sandane. The area is an old church site with the Old Gimmestad Church and the "new" Gimmestad Church both located here, which is why this coastal area is also sometimes referred to as Gimmestad.

== Climate ==
Climate data for Sandane 1991–2020 (51 m)
Month	Jan	Feb	Mar	Apr	May	Jun	Jul	Aug	Sep	Oct	Nov	Dec	Year
Mean daily maximum °C (°F)	3.4 (38.1)	3.5 (38.3)	5.8 (42.4)	10 (50)	14.2 (57.6)	17.3 (63.1)	19.5 (67.1)	18.6 (65.5)	14.9 (58.8)	9.7 (49.5)	5.9 (42.6)	3.5 (38.3)	10.5 (50.9)
Daily mean °C (°F)	1.1 (34.0)	0.7 (33.3)	2.5 (36.5)	6 (43)	9.7 (49.5)	13 (55)	15.4 (59.7)	14.8 (58.6)	11.4 (52.5)	6.6 (43.9)	3.3 (37.9)	1.2 (34.2)	7.1 (44.8)
Mean daily minimum °C (°F)	−1.7 (28.9)	−2.1 (28.2)	−0.4 (31.3)	2.4 (36.3)	5.4 (41.7)	9.1 (48.4)	11.6 (52.9)	11.2 (52.2)	8.2 (46.8)	3.8 (38.8)	0.8 (33.4)	−1.5 (29.3)	3.9 (39.0)
Average precipitation mm (inches)	155 (6.1)	122 (4.8)	110 (4.3)	66 (2.6)	62 (2.4)	69 (2.7)	71 (2.8)	96 (3.8)	129 (5.1)	153 (6.0)	150 (5.9)	174 (6.9)	1,357 (53.4)
Average precipitation days (≥ 1.0 mm)	16	15	15	12	10	11	12	15	14	15	15	17	167
Source 1: yr.no/Met.no
Source 2: Noaa WMO averages 91-2020 Norway
