= Firda Upper Secondary School =

School in Vestland, Norway

Coordinates: 61.7728°N 6.2150°E

Firda Upper School
- Firda vidaregåande skule
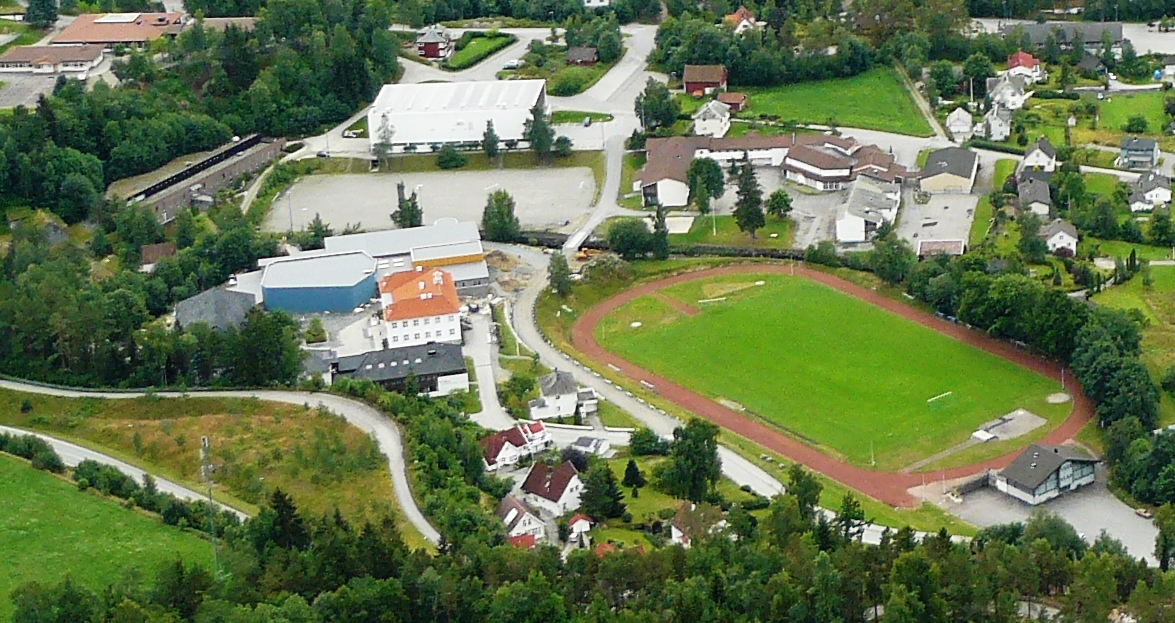
- Firda Upper School and Sandane Stadium

Location
- Sandane, Gloppen Municipality; Norway

Information
- Type: Upper secondary school
- Website: firda.vgs.no

Firda Upper Secondary School (Nynorsk: Firda vidaregåande skule) is a school located in the village of Sandane in Gloppen Municipality in Vestland county, Norway. The highway European route E39 highway passes just north of the school.

The school features in the NRK series Lovleg.

In 1927, Kaare Fostervoll who was later director-general of the Norwegian Broadcasting Corporation was a headmaster here from 1927–1938.
