= Gloppefjorden =

Fjord in Vestland, Norway

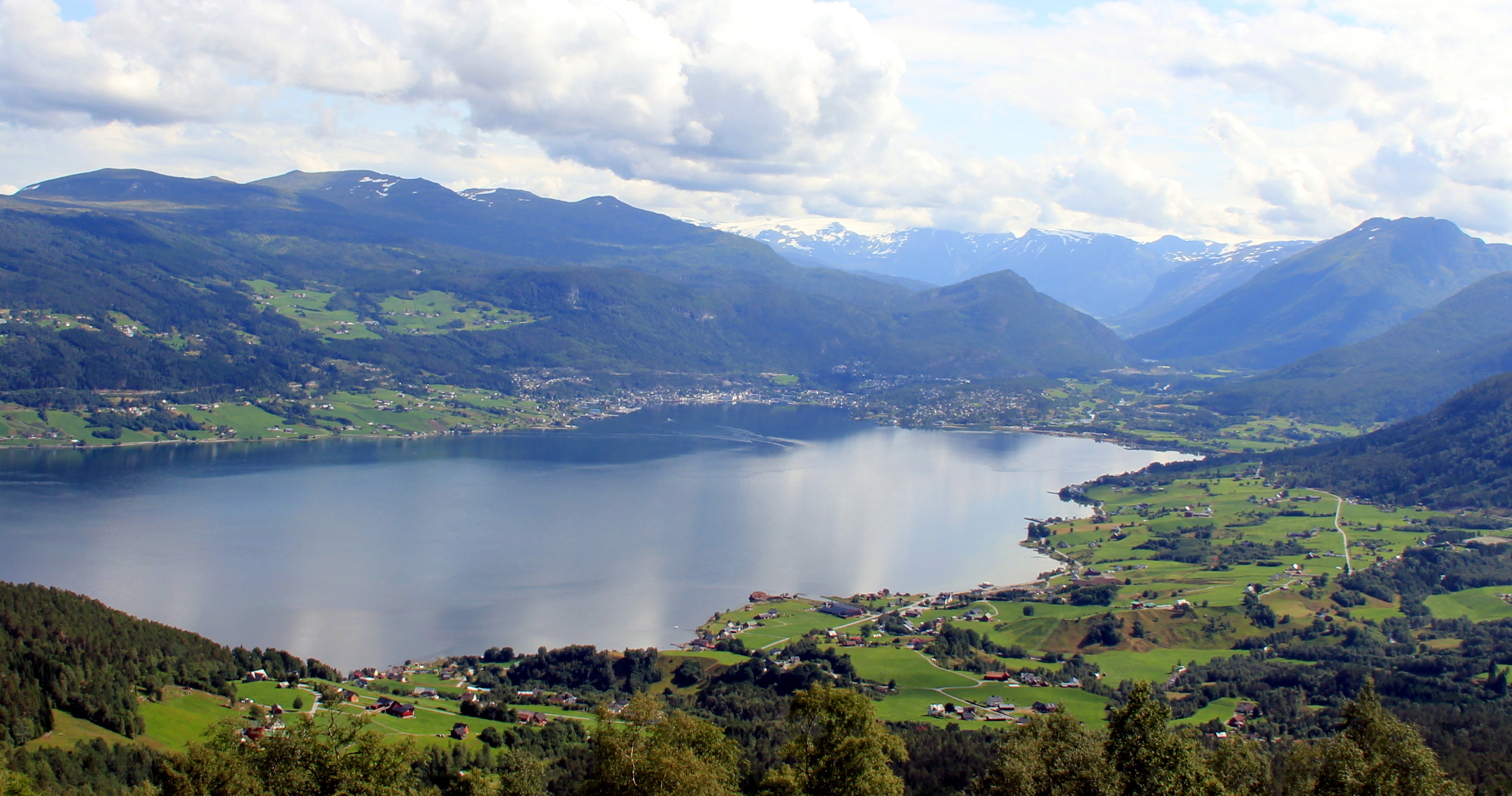
- View of the fjord
- Interactive map of the fjord
- Location: Vestland county, Norway
- Coordinates: 61.80266°N 6.11159°E
- Type: Fjord
- Primary inflows: Gloppeelva river
- Primary outflows: Nordfjorden
- Basin countries: Norway
- Max. length: 12 kilometres (7.5 mi)
- Max. width: 2.7 kilometres (1.7 mi)
- Settlements: Sandane, Vereide, Sørstranda

Gloppefjorden is a fjord in Gloppen Municipality in Vestland county, Norway. The 12-kilometre (7.5 mi) long fjord flows from the village of Sandane in the southeast to its mouth at the Nordfjorden in the northwest. The river Gloppeelva is the primary inflow on the fjord. The river comes from the large lake Breimsvatnet. The 2.7-kilometre (1.7 mi) wide fjord has a lot of settlements along the inner parts of the fjord, especially on the eastern side of the fjord. The most notable village areas are Sandane, Vereide, and Sørstranda. The European route E39 highway runs along the eastern side of the fjord. Sandane Airport, Anda is located near the mouth of the fjord.

== See also ==
- List of Norwegian fjords
