= Sandane =

Village in Gloppen Municipality, Norway

- Village
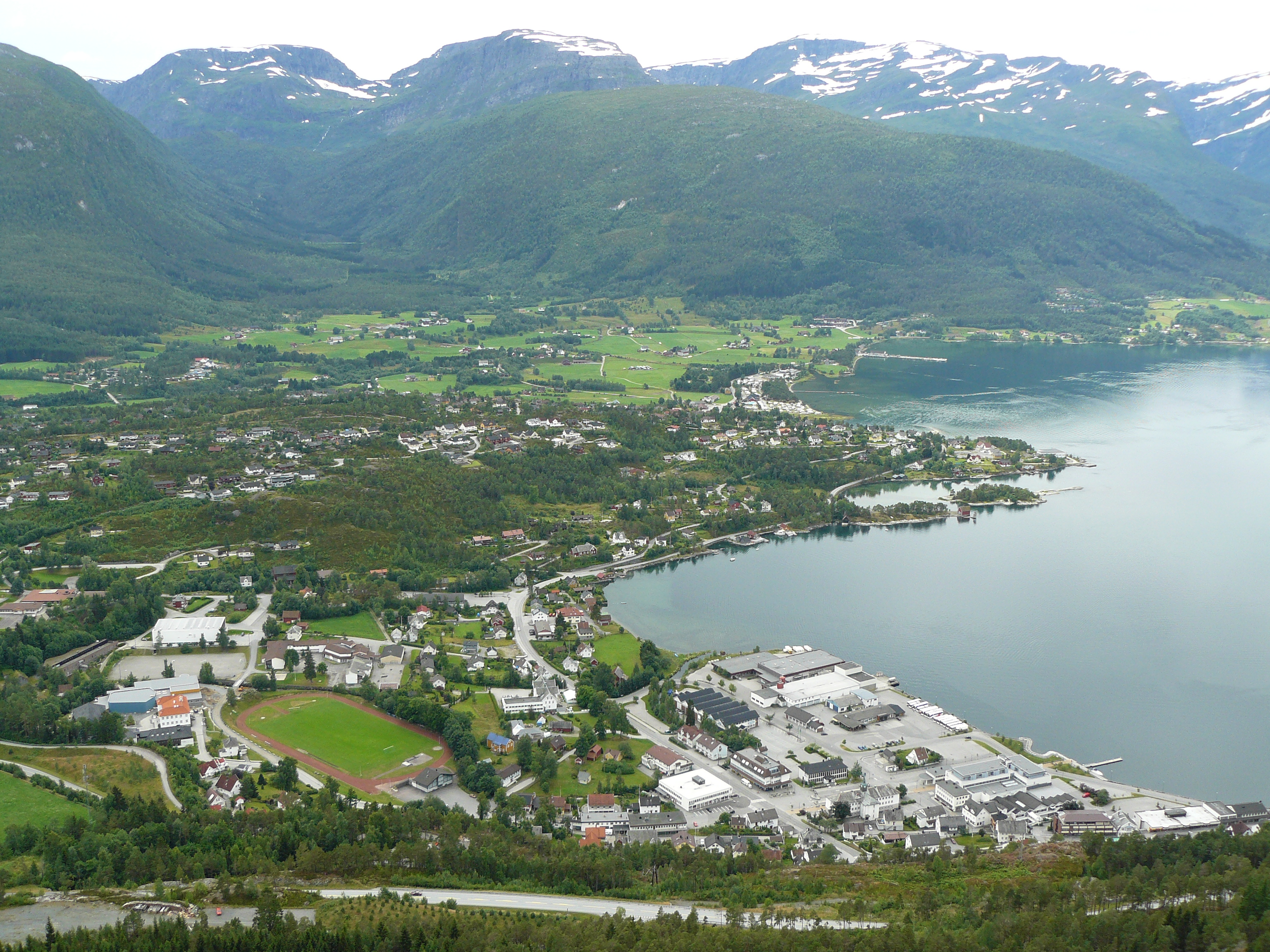
- View of Sandane
- Interactive map of Sandane
- Location within Vestland Location within Norway
- Coordinates: 61.77695°N 6.21641°E
- Country: Norway
- Region: Western Norway
- County: Vestland
- District: Nordfjord
- Municipality: Gloppen Municipality

Area
  - Total: 2.44 km^{2} (0.94 sq mi)
- Elevation: 10 m (33 ft)

Population (2024)
  - Total: 2,584
  - Density: 1,059/km^{2} (2,740/sq mi)
- Time zone: UTC+01:00 (CET)
  - Summer (DST): UTC+02:00 (CEST)
- Post Code: 6823 Sandane

Sandane is the administrative centre of Gloppen Municipality in Vestland county, Norway. It is located at the end of the Gloppefjorden, along the European route E39 highway. Sandane is 20 kilometres (12 mi) south of the village of Nordfjordeid and about 16 kilometres (9.9 mi) west of the village of Byrkjelo. Sandane Airport, Anda is located 10 kilometres (6.2 mi) northwest of Sandane along highway E39. Sandane has several suburban areas that surround the nearby fjord such as Sørstranda to the west and Vereide to the northwest.

The 2.44-square-kilometre (600-acre) village has a population (2024) of 2,584 and a population density of 1,059 inhabitants per square kilometre (2,740/sq mi). The Firda Upper Secondary School and Sandane Church are both located in Sandane. Sandane is located close to the lake Breimsvatn, the Myklebustbreen glacier, and Jostedalsbreen National Park.

== Climate ==
Climate data for Sandane 1991–2020 (51 m)
| Month | Jan | Feb | Mar | Apr | May | Jun | Jul | Aug | Sep | Oct | Nov | Dec | Year |
|---|---|---|---|---|---|---|---|---|---|---|---|---|---|
| Mean daily maximum °C (°F) | 3.4 (38.1) | 3.5 (38.3) | 5.8 (42.4) | 10 (50) | 14.2 (57.6) | 17.3 (63.1) | 19.5 (67.1) | 18.6 (65.5) | 14.9 (58.8) | 9.7 (49.5) | 5.9 (42.6) | 3.5 (38.3) | 10.5 (50.9) |
| Daily mean °C (°F) | 1.1 (34.0) | 0.7 (33.3) | 2.5 (36.5) | 6 (43) | 9.7 (49.5) | 13 (55) | 15.4 (59.7) | 14.8 (58.6) | 11.4 (52.5) | 6.6 (43.9) | 3.3 (37.9) | 1.2 (34.2) | 7.1 (44.8) |
| Mean daily minimum °C (°F) | −1.7 (28.9) | −2.1 (28.2) | −0.4 (31.3) | 2.4 (36.3) | 5.4 (41.7) | 9.1 (48.4) | 11.6 (52.9) | 11.2 (52.2) | 8.2 (46.8) | 3.8 (38.8) | 0.8 (33.4) | −1.5 (29.3) | 3.9 (39.0) |
| Average precipitation mm (inches) | 155 (6.1) | 122 (4.8) | 110 (4.3) | 66 (2.6) | 62 (2.4) | 69 (2.7) | 71 (2.8) | 96 (3.8) | 129 (5.1) | 153 (6.0) | 150 (5.9) | 174 (6.9) | 1,357 (53.4) |
| Average precipitation days (≥ 1.0 mm) | 16 | 15 | 15 | 12 | 10 | 11 | 12 | 15 | 14 | 15 | 15 | 17 | 167 |
Source 1: yr.no/Met.no
Source 2: Noaa WMO averages 91-2020 Norway
