= Gjegnalundsbreen =

Glacier in Vestland county, Norway

- Interactive map of Gjegnalundsbreen
- Type: Mountain glacier
- Location: Vestland, Norway
- Coordinates: 61°48′01″N 05°51′45″E
- Area: 13 km^{2} (5.0 sq mi)
- Highest elevation: 1,590 metres (5,220 ft)

Gjegnalundsbreen is a glacier located in Vestland county, Norway. The 13-square-kilometre (5.0 sq mi) glacier sits on the borders of Bremanger Municipality and Gloppen Municipality. The glacier sits on the eastern side of the 1,670-metre (5,480 ft) tall mountain Blånibba, inside the Ålfotbreen landscape protection area which also includes the nearby Ålfotbreen glacier. The highest point on the glacier is at an elevation of 1,590 metres (5,220 ft) above sea level. The Nordfjorden and Hyefjorden are located just north and east of the glacier. The village of Hyen lies about 5 kilometres (3.1 mi) south of the fjord.
