= Norwegian County Road 615 =

Road in Vestland, Norway

County Road 615
- Bokmål: Fylkesvei 615; Nynorsk: Fylkesveg 615

Major junctions
- From: near Sandane
- To: near Storebru

Location
- Country: Norway
- Counties: Vestland
- Municipalities: Gloppen Municipality

Highway system
- Roads in Norway; National Roads; County Roads

Norwegian County Road 615 (Bokmål: Fylkesvei 615; Nynorsk: Fylkesveg 615), often abbreviated Fv 615, is a county road in Vestland county, Norway. The road runs along the east side of Hyefjorden in Gloppen Municipality, connecting the area near Sandane to Storebru. It features multiple tunnels constructed to reduce avalanche risk.

== Conditions and public feedback ==
In a national survey conducted by NRK, Fv 615 was ranked the second worst county road in Norway, following a section of the E16 between Bergen Municipality and Voss Municipality. Local residents and drivers have criticized the road for being narrow, outdated, and frequently closed due to severe weather and maintenance issues.

== Maintenance and development ==
Portions of the road, particularly between Storebru and Solheim, are under review for future improvements. A public tender was issued in 2025 by Vestland county for repair and safety upgrades.

== See also ==
- Norwegian county road
- Hyefjorden
- Gloppen Municipality
