= Rock carvings at Vingen =

Set of petroglyphs in Bremanger Municipality, Vestland, Norway

Coordinates: 61°49′46″N 5°18′50″E

The Vingen rock carvings (Norwegian: Vingenfeltet) are a set of petroglyphs located along the Frøysjøen strait in Bremanger Municipality in Vestland county, Norway. They are located about 10 kilometres (6.2 mi) straight east of the village of Berle and about 8 kilometres (5.0 mi) south of the village of Rugsund. The area is accessible by boat or by a 4 to 5 kilometres (2.5 to 3.1 mi) hike from the nearest roads.

== History ==
Vingen is one of the largest rock carving sites in Northern Europe. The site contains at least 2,000 different carvings and prints dating back to 4000–2000 years BC. The figures are mostly of deer. There are also some other animal carvings, many other abstract geometric patterns and human figures.

The site was discovered in 1910 by Kristian Bing, a lawyer from the city of Bergen. Kristian Magdalon Bing (1862-1935) was also a noted pioneer in the sport of mountain climbing. He was looking for a farm he could buy to commercialise the hydropower from the waterfalls in the area. In 1913, Kristian Bing bought the property. He retained rights to several large waterfalls but subsequently sold the site where most rock carvings are located to the Bergen Museum in 1923.

== Current usage ==
Around 1,500 rock carvings have been found in Vingen, while around 500 others are scattered around at nearby Hennøy, Vingelven, and Fura. Various security measures have been set in place to protect the carvings from natural and anthropogenic influence. In 2002, the rock carvings at Vingen and the area around the site were closed to the public by the Norwegian Directorate for Cultural Heritage. Entering the site without granted permission is forbidden. Bergen Museum still owns and manages the site.
