= Hyen Church =

Church in Vestland, Norway

- Hyen kyrkje
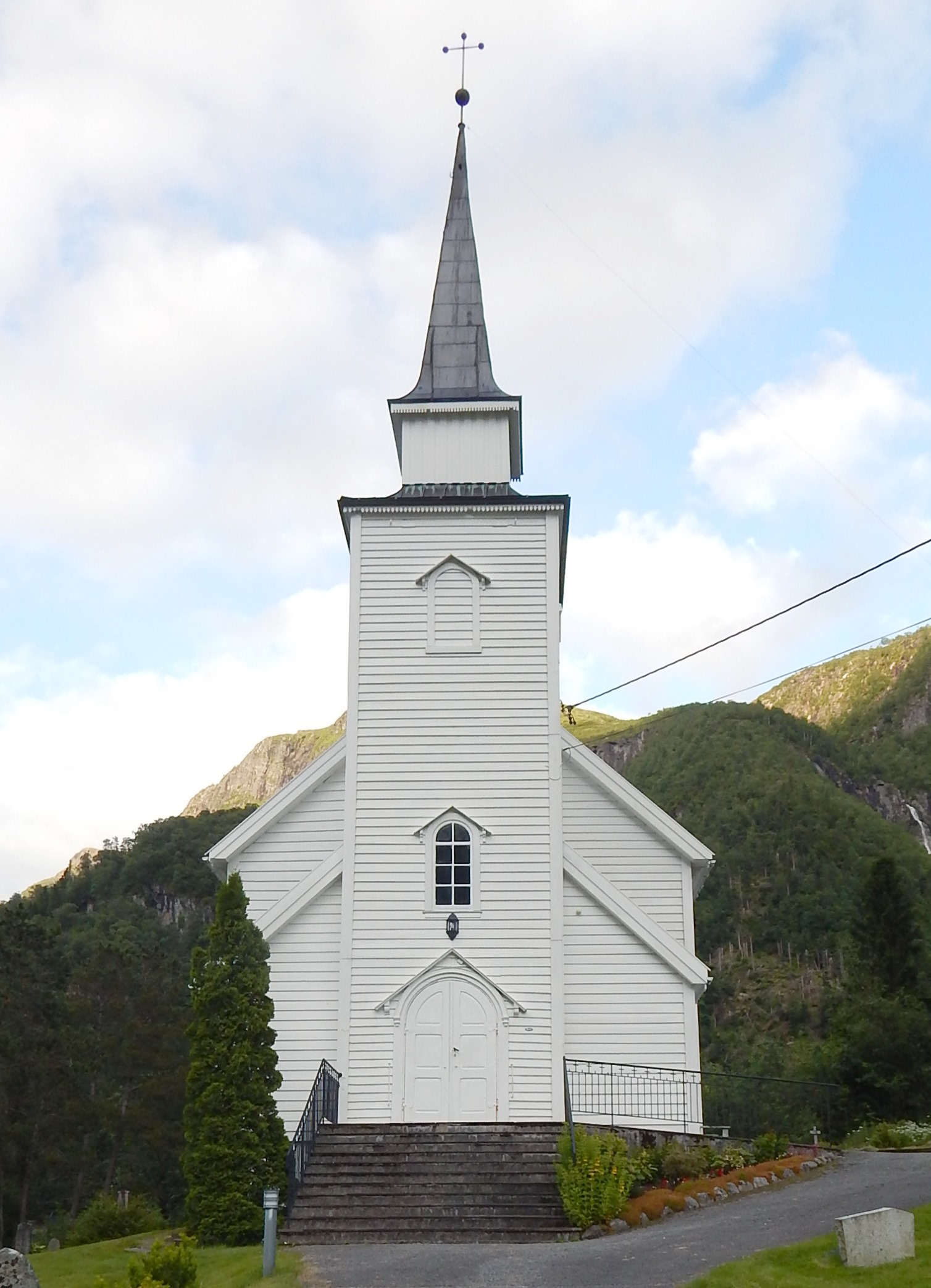
- View of the church
- Hyen Church
- 61°44′22″N 5°55′07″E
- Location: Gloppen Municipality, Vestland
- Country: Norway
- Denomination: Church of Norway
- Churchmanship: Evangelical Lutheran

History
- Status: Parish church
- Founded: 13th century
- Consecrated: 14 June 1876

Architecture
- Functional status: Active
- Architect: Karl Uchermann
- Architectural type: Long church
- Completed: 1875 (151 years ago)

Specifications
- Capacity: 300
- Materials: Wood

Administration
- Diocese: Bjørgvin bispedømme
- Deanery: Nordfjord prosti
- Parish: Hyen
- Norwegian Cultural Heritage Site
- Type: Church
- Status: Not protected
- ID: 84684

Hyen Church (Norwegian: Hyen kyrkje) is a parish church of the Church of Norway in Gloppen Municipality in Vestland county, Norway. It is located in the village of Straume, near the shore of the Hyefjorden. It is the church for the Hyen parish which is part of the Nordfjord prosti (deanery) in the Diocese of Bjørgvin. The white, wooden church was built in a long church style in 1876 by the architect Karl Uchermann. The church seats about 300 people.

== History ==
The earliest existing historical records of the church date back to the year 1308, but it was not new at that time. The first church was likely a wooden stave church that was likely built in the 13th century. This church was located at the village of Hope, about 2 kilometres (1.2 mi) west of the present location at Straume. Sometime around the mid-1300s, around the time of the Black Death in this region, the church was closed down and no longer used. Eventually the church was torn down. Parishioners living in the Hyen area were forced to make the long, arduous journey by boat to the Vereide Church. For about 500 years, there was no church in Hyen.

In the early 1800s, residents of the Hyen area tried very hard to get a local church for themselves once again. After many years of pushing the government officials to allow a new church to be built. Finally, in 1875, the church was finally approved, but it was to be built in Straume, at the head of the Hyefjorden, rather than further inland at Hope, where the medieval stave church once stood. The church was designed by Karl Kristian Uchermann, the son of the parish priest. The new church was consecrated on 14 June 1876 by Bishop Peder Hersleb Graah Birkeland. At the same time, a new Hyen parish was established. Around the year 1900, a wooden stove was installed at the church to provide heat. In 1960, electric lighting was installed in the church and then in 1963, the wood stove was removed and electric heating was installed.

== See also ==
- List of churches in Bjørgvin
