= Ålfotbreen =

Glacier in Vestland county, Norway

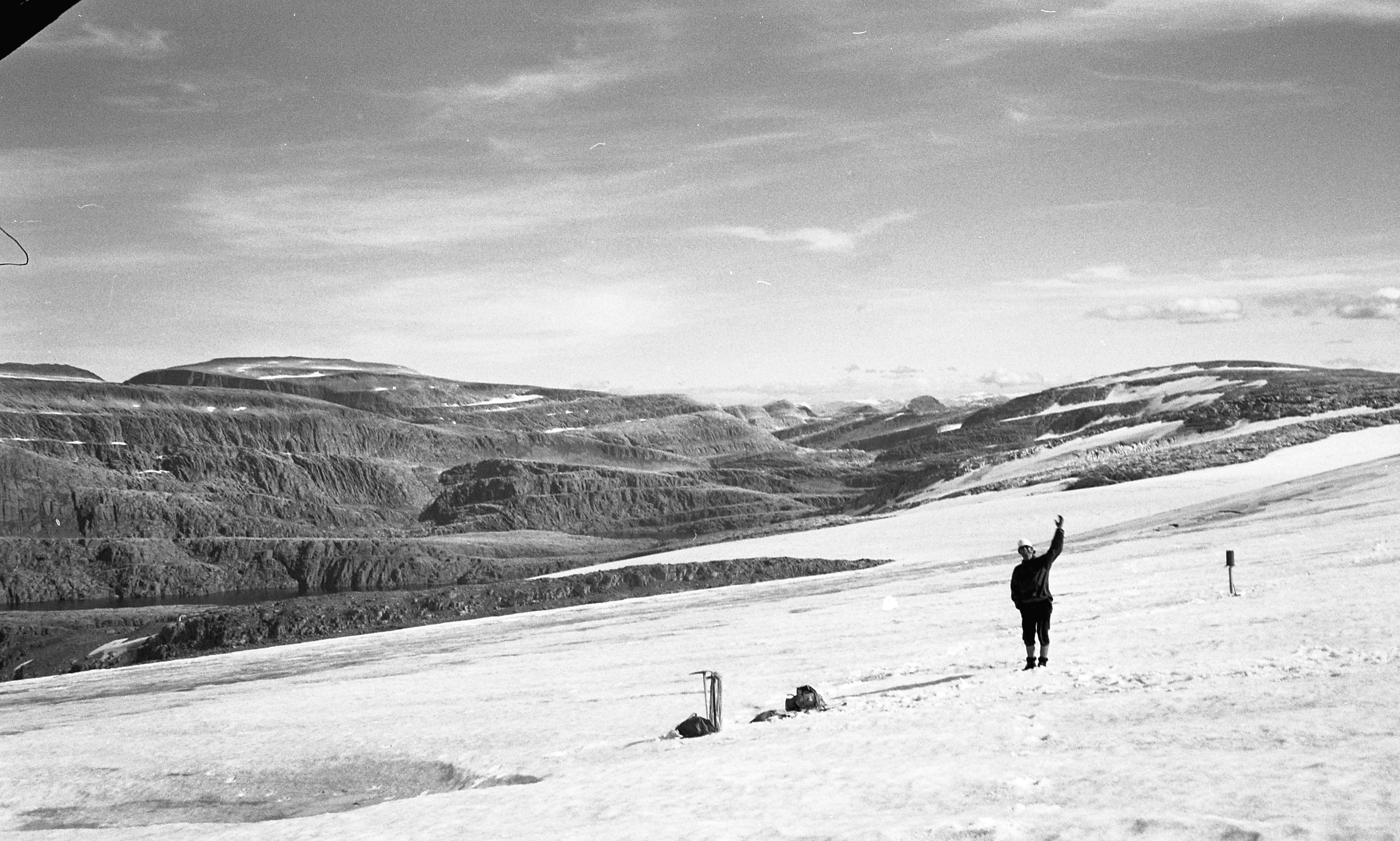
- View of the glacier
- Interactive map of the glacier
- Type: Mountain glacier
- Location: Vestland, Norway
- Coordinates: 61°44′27″N 05°38′07″E
- Area: 17 km^{2} (6.6 sq mi)
- Length: 6.5 kilometres (4.0 mi)
- Thickness: 8 to 10 metres (26 to 33 ft)

Ålfotbreen is a glacier located in Vestland county, Norway. The 17-square-kilometre (6.6 sq mi) glacier is located in the Nordfjord region and it straddles the borders of Bremanger Municipality, Kinn Municipality, and Gloppen Municipality. It is located west of the village of Hyen, south of the village of Ålfoten, and east of the village of Svelgen.

The glacier reaches an elevation of 1,385 metres (4,544 ft) at its highest point. The area surrounding the glacier, closer to the Nordfjorden, is one of the wettest places in Norway, getting an average of 5,600 millimetres (220 in) of rainfall each year. The heavy precipitation keeps the glacier very healthy with an average thickness of 8 to 10 metres (26 to 33 ft).

On 9 January 2009, the 226-square-kilometre (87 sq mi) area surrounding the glacier, the glacier itself, and the nearby Gjegnalundsbreen glacier, were preserved as a landscape protection area by the Norwegian government.

Mass balance measurements have been performed at the glacier since 1963 by the Norwegian Water Resources and Energy Directorate (NVE).

== See also ==
- List of glaciers in Norway
