= Kristian Magdalon Bing =

Norwegian jurist, author and mountaineer

Kristian Magdalon Bing (30 May 1862 – 6 July 1935) was a Norwegian jurist, author and mountaineer. He is commonly credited for re-introducing the tradition of celebrating Olsok (1897) and reviving it as an annual ceremony commemorating the death of St. Olav at Stiklestad.

== Biography ==
Bing was born in Bergen, Norway. His parents were Lars Hess Bing (1833-1870) and Christine Marie Ingebrechtsen (1837-1935). He father was a judge in Sunnhordland. Bing earned a law degree and starting practicing in his hometown in 1891 after serving a year as editor at the newspaper Bergens Tidende. He was also a writer perhaps most associated with the work, Guttekorpsene i Bergen from 1889.

Bing was a pioneer in climbing in Norway, and made several first ascents of mountains and glaciers. He was a capable mountaineer and the first on a number of peaks and glaciers between Finnmark and Folgefonna. The ice phenomenon Bings Gryte at the Jostedalsbreen glacier is named after him.

In 1910, he discovered the rock carvings at Vingen in Sogn og Fjordane. These were the first rock carvings with hunting motifs discovered in Norway. He was looking for a site where he could access hydropower from the waterfalls in the area. In 1913, Kristian Bing purchased the property. He retained rights to several large waterfalls but subsequently sold the site where most rock carvings are located to the Bergen Museum in 1923.

== Personal life ==
In 1915, he married Unni Mette Ingebrigtsen (1878-1966). He was the grandfather of law professor and science fiction author, Jon Bing.

== Selected works ==
- Guttekorpsene i Bergen (1889)
- Dræggens linjekorps historie (1906)
- Nordnæs linjekorps og bataljons historie (1908)
- Olsoktradition (1919)
