= Eimhjellevatnet =

Lake in Vestland, Norway

Eimhjellevatnet Storfjorden
- Interactive map of the lake
- Location: Gloppen Municipality, Vestland
- Coordinates: 61.63844°N 5.75002°E
- Primary inflows: Heimelva river
- Primary outflows: Sagelva river
- Basin countries: Norway
- Max. length: 9 kilometres (5.6 mi)
- Max. width: 1.5 kilometres (0.93 mi)
- Surface area: 11.39 km^{2} (4.40 sq mi)
- Max. depth: 139 m (456 ft)
- Shore length^{1}: 28.37 kilometres (17.63 mi)
- Surface elevation: 123 metres (404 ft)
- References: NVE
- ^{1} Shore length is not a well-defined measure.

Eimhjellevatnet or Storfjorden is a lake in Hyen area of Gloppen Municipality in Vestland county, Norway. The 11.39-square-kilometre (4.40 sq mi) lake is located in the western part of the municipality near the border with Kinn Municipality. The villages of Eimhjellen and Solheim can be found along its shore and the village of Straume lies about 15 kilometres (9.3 mi) to the north. The lake lies about 25 kilometres (16 mi) southwest of the municipal center of Sandane. It is the second largest lake in all of Gloppen Municipality (after Breimsvatnet) and it has a good population of trout for fishing.

== See also ==
- List of lakes in Norway
