= Rugsund Church =

Church in Vestland, Norway

- Rugsund kyrkje
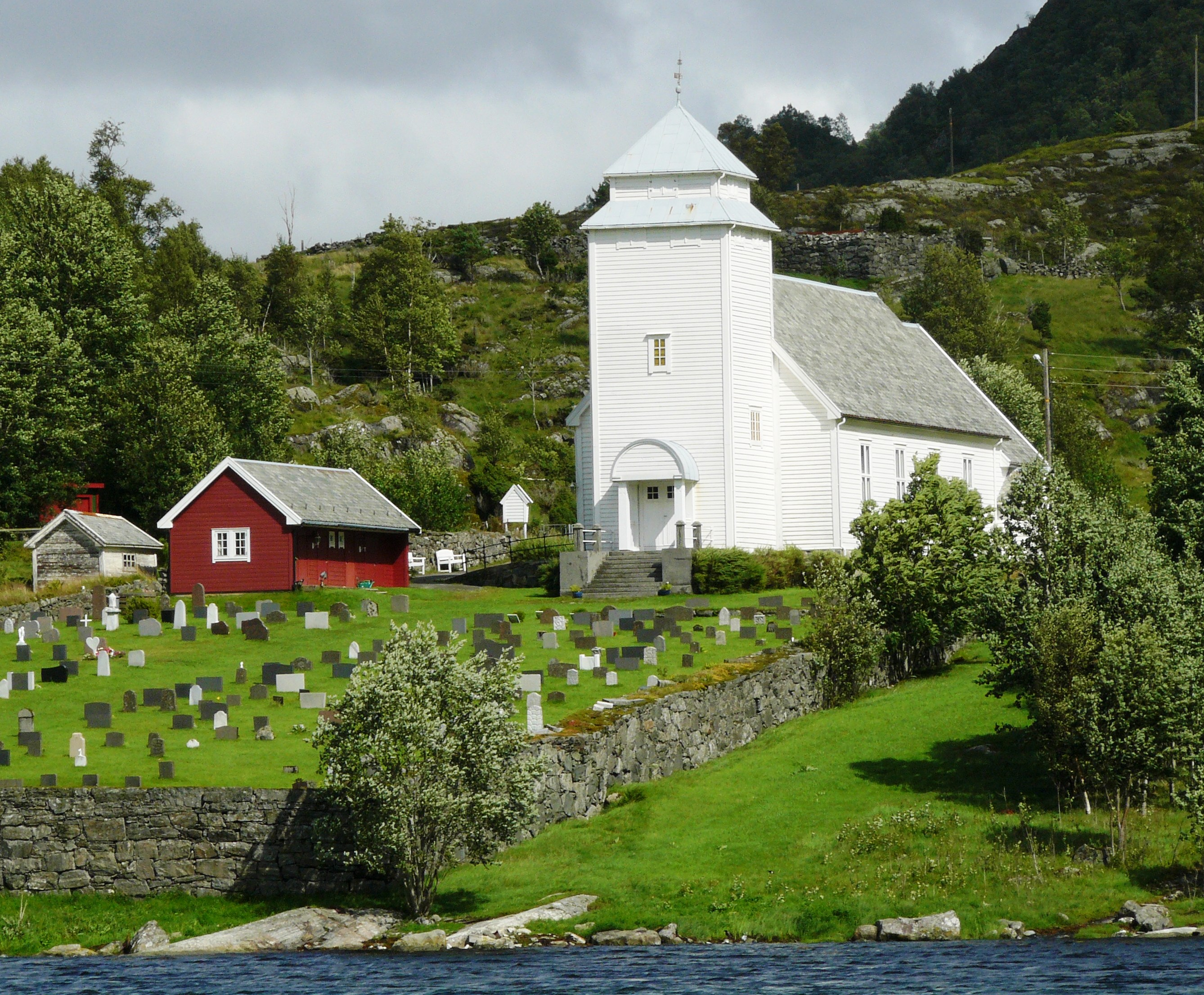
- View of the church
- Rugsund Church
- 61°53′14″N 5°20′40″E
- Location: Bremanger Municipality, Vestland
- Country: Norway
- Denomination: Church of Norway
- Churchmanship: Evangelical Lutheran
- Website: kyrkja.no/bremanger

History
- Status: Parish church
- Founded: 13th century
- Consecrated: 2 September 1838

Architecture
- Functional status: Active
- Architect: Hans Linstow
- Architectural type: Long church
- Completed: 1838 (188 years ago)

Specifications
- Capacity: 400
- Materials: Wood

Administration
- Diocese: Bjørgvin bispedømme
- Deanery: Nordfjord prosti
- Parish: Rugsund
- Norwegian Cultural Heritage Site
- Type: Church
- Status: Automatically protected
- ID: 85323

Rugsund Church (Norwegian: Rugsund kyrkje) is a parish church of the Church of Norway in Bremanger Municipality in Vestland county, Norway. It is located on the Hessevågen farm on the mainland side of the village of Rugsund, on the southern coast of the Nordfjorden. It is the church for the Rugsund parish which is part of the Nordfjord prosti (deanery) in the Diocese of Bjørgvin. The white, wooden church was built in a long church style in 1838 using plans by the architect Hans Linstow. The church seats about 400 people.

== History ==
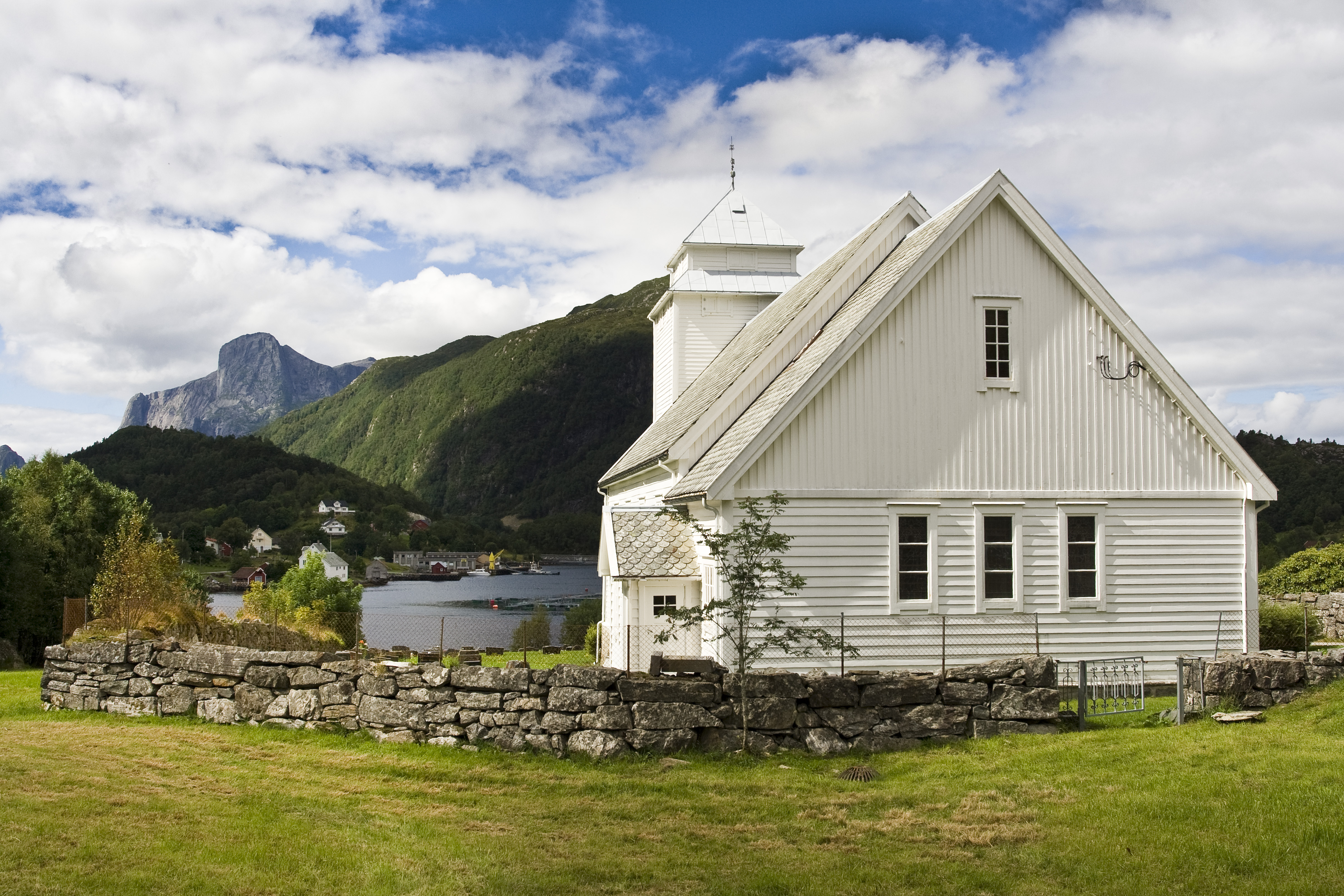
View of the church

The earliest existing historical records of the church date back to the year 1330, but the church was not new that year. The first church in Rugsund was originally located on the island of Rugsundøya. It was a wooden stave church that was likely built in the 13th century. This medieval church was in use until 1650 when it was torn down and replaced. The new church was a small, timber-framed long church. This church burned down on 5 March 1834 after being struck by lightning. After the fire, the parish debated where to build the replacement church. The reason for the debate was that there was such a shallow layer of soil at the old church site that it was difficult to maintain the church cemetery there on Rugsundøya. The soil conditions were actually so bad that funeral parties transported masses of soil by boat to the graveyard to cover the coffins with. Because of this, it was decided to build a new graveyard and church across the small strait on the mainland in the village of Rugsund.

The present church building was constructed in 1838 to replace the previous building on Rugsundøya that had burned down. The beautiful location of the previous church on the point above the harbour was a navigational landmark for ships. When the present church was to be built, people demanded a similarly beautiful location. The new church was built by the builders Strømme and Strømsheim from Sykkylven Municipality. The church was consecrated on 2 September 1838. At Rugsund, the church was centrally located with the main entrance facing the sea, and with an excellent view from the church steps across the sound to the island. The churchyard encircles the church, and furthest down to the sea, there is a stately gate that the seafarers in earlier times walked through on their way to church. This was also the place where the vicar went ashore when he came by boat from Davik. By the turn of the 20th century, the church was deemed to be too small. The church building was remodeled in 1911–1912. During this renovation, the tower was rebuilt, a new choir was built along with a sacristy. New windows were also installed.

== See also ==
- List of churches in Bjørgvin
