= Ålfoten Church =

Church in Vestland, Norway

- Ålfoten kyrkje
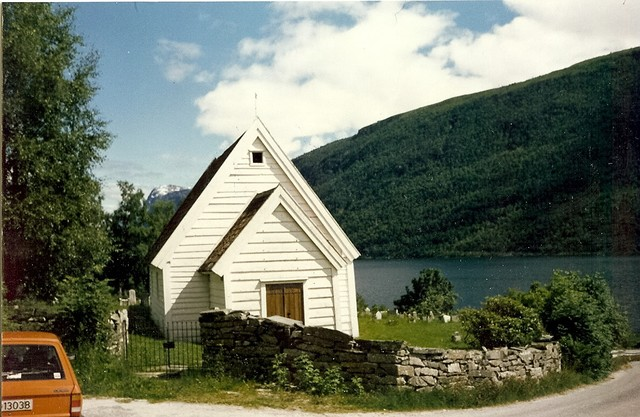
- View of the church
- Ålfoten Church
- 61°50′23″N 5°40′41″E
- Location: Bremanger Municipality, Vestland
- Country: Norway
- Denomination: Church of Norway
- Churchmanship: Evangelical Lutheran
- Website: kyrkja.no/bremanger

History
- Status: Parish church
- Founded: 13th century
- Consecrated: c. 1620

Architecture
- Functional status: Active
- Architectural type: Long church
- Completed: c. 1620 (406 years ago)

Specifications
- Capacity: 100
- Materials: Wood

Administration
- Diocese: Bjørgvin bispedømme
- Deanery: Nordfjord prosti
- Parish: Ålfoten
- Norwegian Cultural Heritage Site
- Type: Church
- Status: Automatically protected
- ID: 85959

Ålfoten Church (Norwegian: Ålfoten kyrkje) is a parish church of the Church of Norway in Bremanger Municipality in Vestland county, Norway. It is located in the village of Ålfoten, very close to the shore of the Ålfotfjorden. It is the church for the Ålfoten parish which is part of the Nordfjord prosti (deanery) in the Diocese of Bjørgvin. The white, cog-joint, wooden church was built in a long church style during the 17th century by an unknown architect. The church seats about 100 people.

== History ==
The earliest existing historical records of the church date back to 1330, but it was not new that year. The first church in Ålfoten was a wooden stave church that was likely built during the 13th century. The old church was torn down during the 17th century and replaced with the present church which was built on the same site (or very near the same site) of the old church. For a long time, the year 1678 was believed to be the year of the construction since that is the date on the weather vane on the roof. However, after recent archaeological research at the site that was carried out during some repairs, it more likely dates from about 1610-1620. The most likely explanation is that the church was built around 1610-1620 and by 1678, the front door and church porch was in poor condition so that part was torn down and rebuilt. The weather vane must have been installed at that time. This church is the oldest wooden church still standing in the Nordfjord region of Norway. It is a small, modest church with no tower and a small stone wall around the churchyard. The interior is almost all unpainted. During the late 1970s, the church was renovated. There was some structural work done, the walls were insulated, electrical work was carried out, and electric heating was installed.

== See also ==
- List of churches in Bjørgvin
