= Eimhjellen =

Village in Gloppen Municipality, Norway

- Village
- Interactive map of Eimhjellen
- Location within Vestland Location within Norway
- Coordinates: 61.64494°N 5.81466°E
- Country: Norway
- Region: Western Norway
- County: Vestland
- District: Nordfjord
- Municipality: Gloppen Municipality
- Elevation: 139 m (456 ft)
- Time zone: UTC+01:00 (CET)
  - Summer (DST): UTC+02:00 (CEST)
- Post Code: 6829 Hyen

Eimhjellen is a village in Gloppen Municipality in Vestland county, Norway. It is located in the Hyen area about 17 kilometres (11 mi) south of Straume. The village lies on the eastern shore of the large lake Eimhjellevatnet. The villages of Hjorteset and Solheim lie about 4 to 5 kilometres (2.5 to 3.1 mi) to the west (across the lake).

Eimhjellen has a population of around 40 people living on 12 farms. It is an active agricultural environment with cows, sheep, and pigs. There are forests that surround the village and there is a sawmill, planing mill, and carpentry workshop. Many of the residents work outside of the village in addition to working on their farms. People of all ages live in Eimhjellen, from young children to those over 80 years old. The annual rainfall is 2,760 millimetres (109 in).
