= Bremanger Municipality =

Municipality in Vestland, Norway

Bremanger Municipality Bremanger kommune
- Municipality
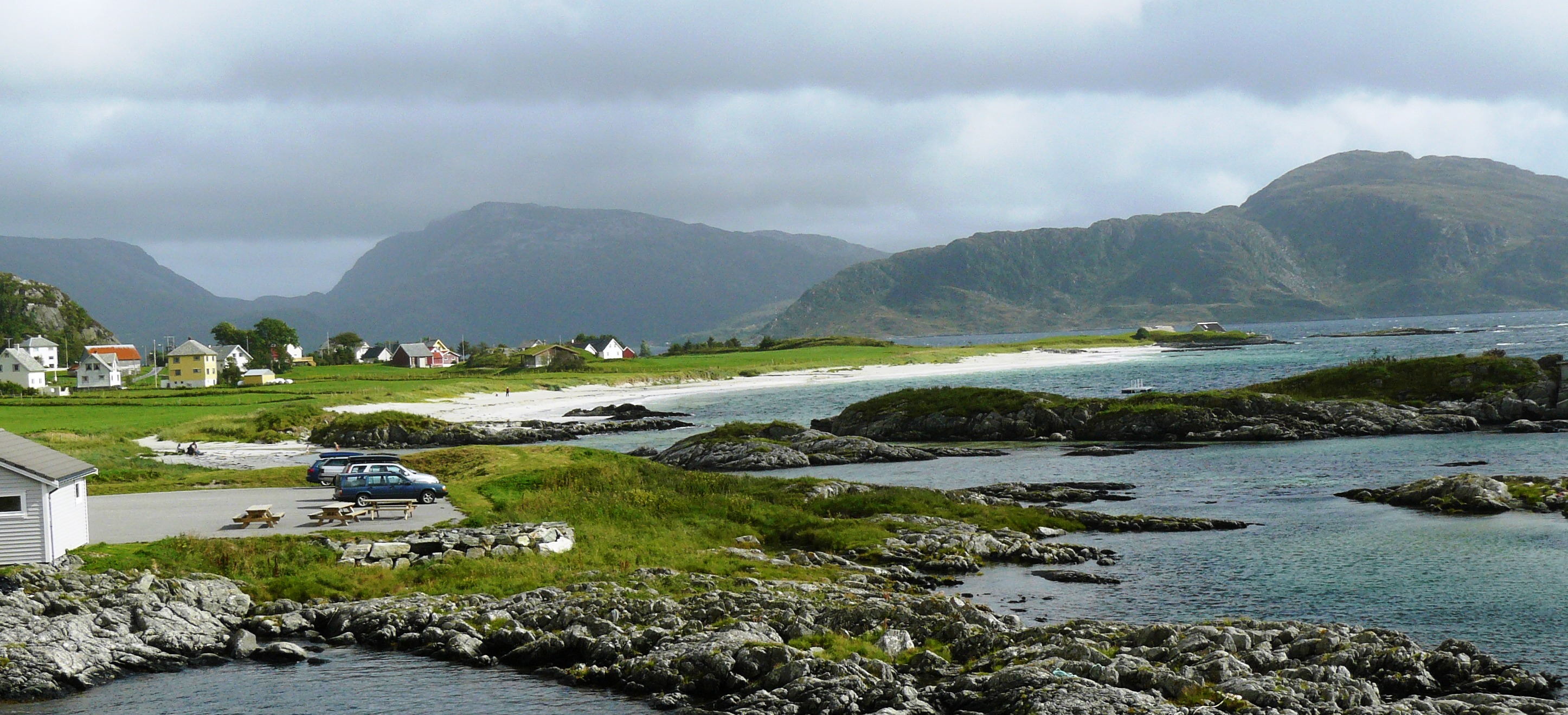
- View of the Grotle beach area in Bremanger

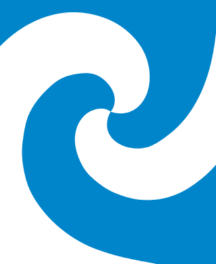
- Flag Coat of arms

- Vestland within Norway

- Bremanger within Vestland
- Coordinates: 61°48′31″N 05°25′15″E
- Country: Norway
- County: Vestland
- District: Nordfjord
- Established: 1 Jan 1866
  - Preceded by: Kinn Municipality
- Administrative centre: Svelgen

Government
  - Mayor (2019): Anne Kristin Førde (Ap)

Area
  - Total: 833.12 km^{2} (321.67 sq mi)
  - Land: 786.43 km^{2} (303.64 sq mi)
  - Water: 46.69 km^{2} (18.03 sq mi) 5.6%
  - Rank: #138 in Norway
- Highest elevation: 1,670.26 m (5,479.9 ft)

Population (2025)
  - Total: 3,361
  - Rank: #220 in Norway
  - Density: 4/km^{2} (10/sq mi)
  - Change (10 years): ▼ −14.1%
- Demonym: Bremangar

Official language
  - Norwegian form: Nynorsk
- Time zone: UTC+01:00 (CET)
  - Summer (DST): UTC+02:00 (CEST)
- ISO 3166 code: NO-4648
- Website: Official website

Bremanger is a municipality in Vestland county, Norway. The village of Svelgen is the administrative centre of the municipality. Other villages include Bremanger, Berle, Davik, Isane, Kalvåg, Rugsund, and Ålfoten. Bremanger is the only municipality in Vestland, which is located in two districts. The northern and eastern parts comprising the villages of Oldeide, Berle, Rugsund, Davik, Isane, and Ålfoten is located in the Nordfjord region, while the villages of Bremanger, Kalvåg, Svelgen, Sørgulen, and Botnane are located in the Sunnfjord region. Politically, the municipality works with the Nordfjord region in the council of Nordfjord municipalities.

The 833.12-square-kilometre (321.67 sq mi) municipality is the 138th largest by area out of the 357 municipalities in Norway. Bremanger Municipality is the 220th most populous municipality in Norway with a population of 3,361. The municipality's population density is 4 inhabitants per square kilometre (10/sq mi) and its population has decreased by 14.1% over the previous 10-year period.

Bremanger has many tourist destinations such as Kalvåg, which has one of the largest and best-kept waterfront environment in the county, the Grotlesanden ocean beach, the Hornelen mountain, with the tallest sea cliff in Northern Europe, Rock carvings at Vingen, and the old trading stations of Rugsund and Smørhavn. The Bortne Tunnel was completed in 2013 to more easily connect the outer islands of Bremanger to the municipal centre of Svelgen. The Skatestraum Tunnel and Rugsund Bridge connect the islands to the mainland.

== General information ==
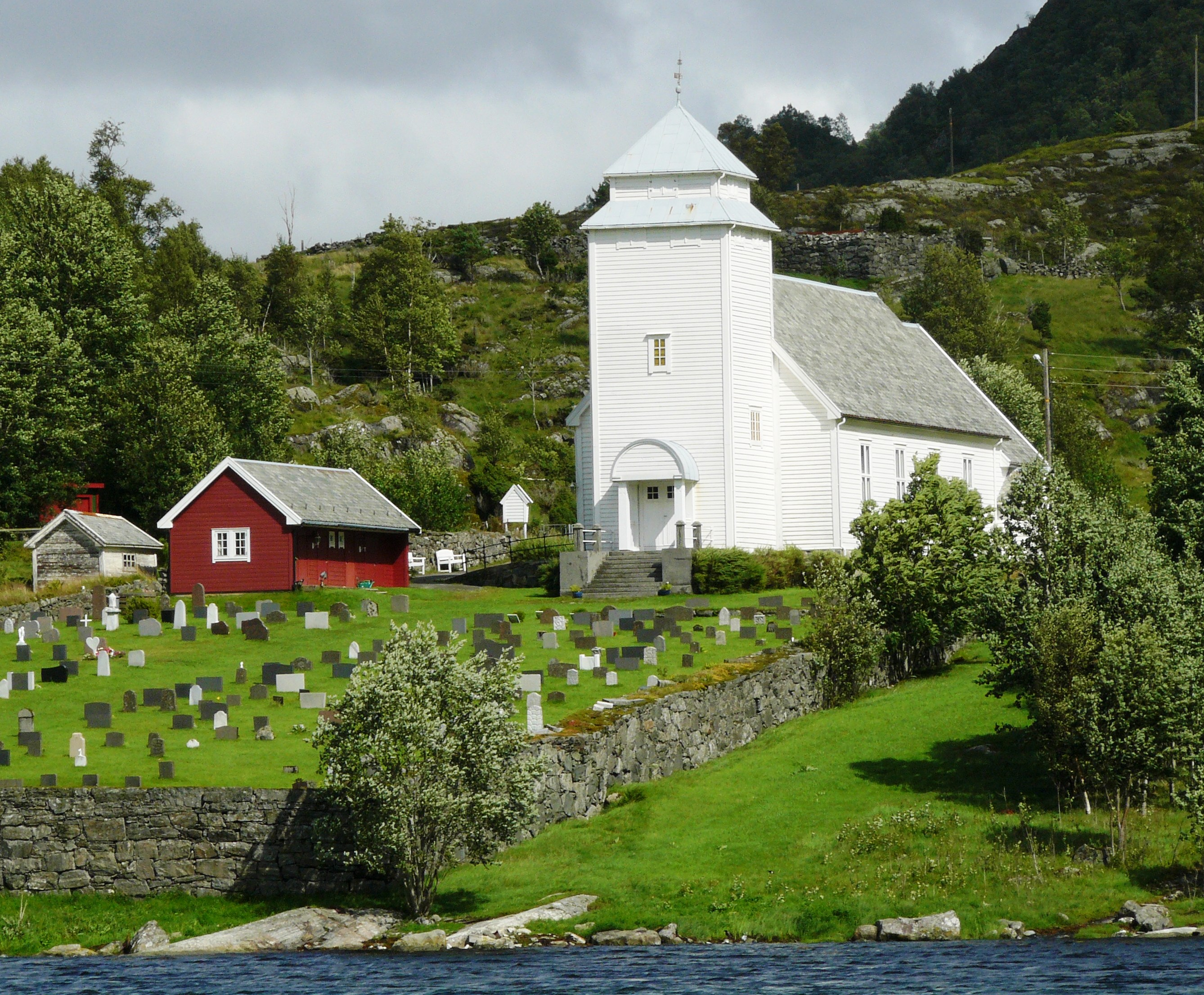
Rugsund Church

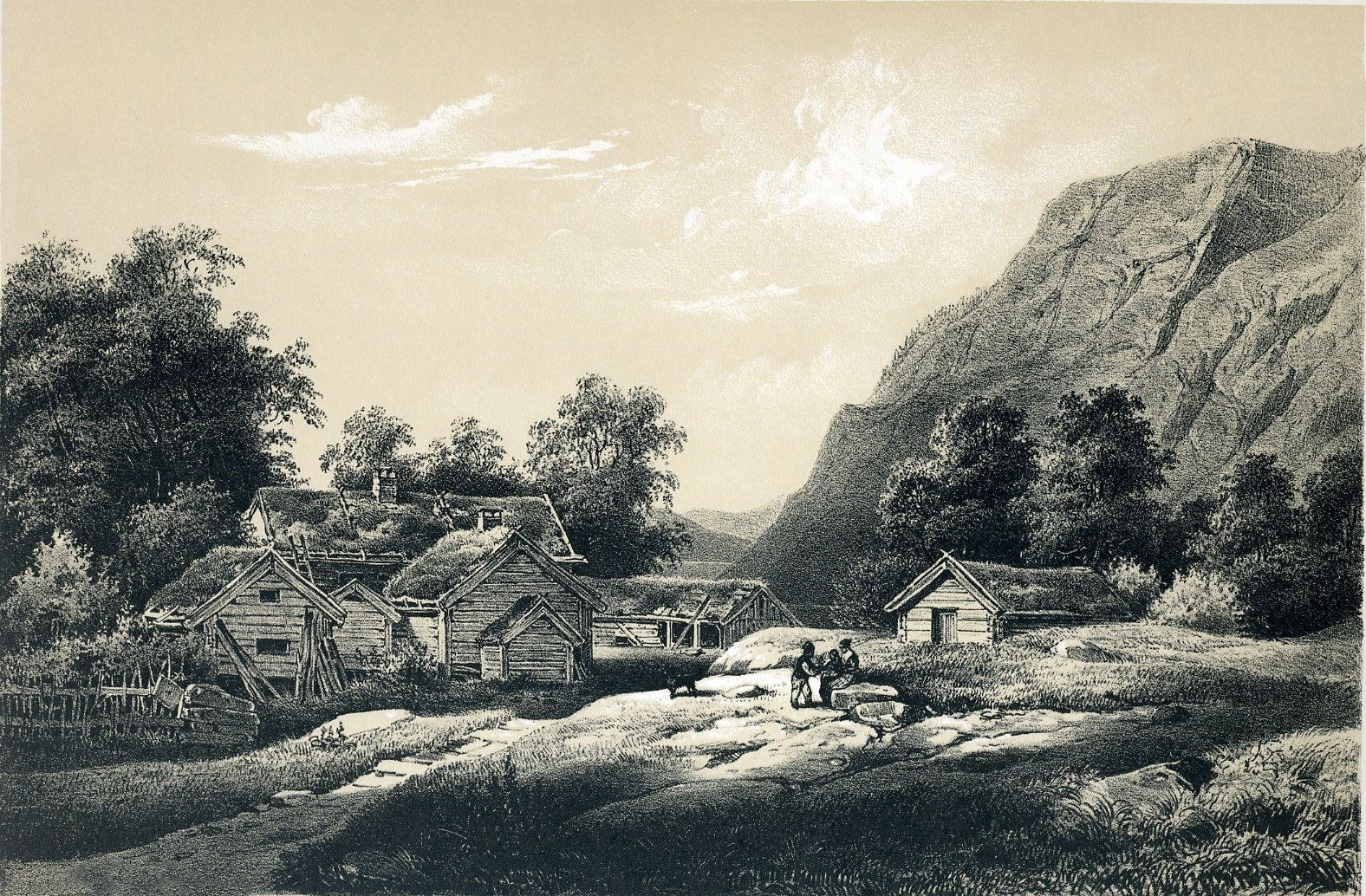
Drawing of Davik parish

The parish of Kinn was established as a municipality on 1 January 1838 (see formannskapsdistrikt law). The northern district of Kinn was established as the prestegjeld (parish) of Bremanger within the municipality of Kinn in 1864. On 1 January 1866, the prestegjeld of Bremanger was established as a separate municipality with a population of 1,852. The Bremanger parish was sub-divided into new sub-parishes in the early 1900s. The Midtgulen sub-parish was created in 1903 and Bremangerpollen in 1908.

During the 1960s, there were many municipal mergers across Norway due to the work of the Schei Committee. On 1 January 1964, the Husefest and Breivik farms were transferred from Bremanger Municipality to the neighboring Flora Municipality. On 1 January 1965, the neighboring Davik Municipality was dissolved and most of it was transferred to Bremanger Municipality. All of Davik Municipality located south of the Nordfjorden and all the islands except Husevågøy, Grindøy, Gangsøy, and Risøy were merged into Bremanger Municipality. This added 1,567 residents to the population of Bremanger Municipality, bringing the new total to 5,600.

Historically, this municipality was part of the old Sogn og Fjordane county. On 1 January 2020, the municipality became a part of the newly-formed Vestland county (after Hordaland and Sogn og Fjordane counties were merged).

=== Name ===
The municipality (originally the parish) is named after the local Bremangerpollen fjord (Old Norse: Brimangr). The first element is brim which means "breaker wave" or "heavy sea". The last element is angr which means "bay" or "inlet".

=== Coat of arms ===
The coat of arms was granted on 24 October 1986. The official blazon is "Quartered embowed azure and argent" (Norwegian: Firedelt av blått og sølv med virvelsnitt). This means the arms have are divided into four embowed waves. The field (background) alternates between the four waves. The top and bottom waves have a tincture of blue and the other two waves have a tincture of argent which means they are commonly colored white, but if the arms are made out of metal, then silver is used. The arms symbolize the sea and hydro-electric power, both of which are of great economic importance to the municipality. The arms were designed by Inge Rotevatn. The municipal flag has the same design as the coat of arms.

=== Churches ===
The Church of Norway has seven parishes (sokn) within Bremanger Municipality. It is part of the Nordfjord prosti (deanery) in the Diocese of Bjørgvin.

Churches in Bremanger Municipality
Parish (sokn)	Church name	Location of the church	Year built
Berle	Berle Church	Berle	1977
Bremanger	Bremanger Church	Bremanger	1914
Davik	Davik Church	Davik	1886
Frøya	Frøya Church	Frøya	1865
Midtgulen	Midtgulen Church	Midtgulen	1904
Rugsund	Rugsund Church	Rugsund	1838
Ålfoten	Ålfoten Church	Ålfoten	1600

== Government ==
Bremanger Municipality is responsible for primary education (through 10th grade), outpatient health services, senior citizen services, welfare and other social services, zoning, economic development, and municipal roads and utilities. The municipality is governed by a municipal council of directly elected representatives. The mayor is indirectly elected by a vote of the municipal council. The municipality is under the jurisdiction of the Sogn og Fjordane District Court and the Gulating Court of Appeal.

=== Municipal council ===
The municipal council (Kommunestyre) of Bremanger Municipality is made up of 23 representatives that are elected to four-year terms. The tables below show the current and historical composition of the council by political party.

Bremanger kommunestyre 2023–2027
Party name (in Nynorsk)	Number of representatives
Labour Party (Arbeidarpartiet)	6
Conservative Party (Høgre)	3
Industry and Business Party (Industri‑ og Næringspartiet)	3
Christian Democratic Party (Kristeleg Folkeparti)	1
Centre Party (Senterpartiet)	4
Socialist Left Party (Sosialistisk Venstreparti)	1
Liberal Party (Venstre)	5
Total number of members:	23

Bremanger kommunestyre 2019–2023
Party name (in Nynorsk)	Number of representatives
Labour Party (Arbeidarpartiet)	7
Conservative Party (Høgre)	4
Centre Party (Senterpartiet)	6
Socialist Left Party (Sosialistisk Venstreparti)	1
Liberal Party (Venstre)	5
Total number of members:	23

Bremanger kommunestyre 2015–2019
Party name (in Nynorsk)	Number of representatives
Labour Party (Arbeidarpartiet)	8
Conservative Party (Høgre)	5
Christian Democratic Party (Kristeleg Folkeparti)	1
Centre Party (Senterpartiet)	5
Socialist Left Party (Sosialistisk Venstreparti)	1
Liberal Party (Venstre)	3
Total number of members:	23

Bremanger kommunestyre 2011–2015
Party name (in Nynorsk)	Number of representatives
Labour Party (Arbeidarpartiet)	6
Progress Party (Framstegspartiet)	2
Conservative Party (Høgre)	6
Christian Democratic Party (Kristeleg Folkeparti)	1
Centre Party (Senterpartiet)	5
Socialist Left Party (Sosialistisk Venstreparti)	1
Liberal Party (Venstre)	2
Total number of members:	23

Bremanger kommunestyre 2007–2011
Party name (in Nynorsk)	Number of representatives
Labour Party (Arbeidarpartiet)	11
Progress Party (Framstegspartiet)	2
Conservative Party (Høgre)	3
Christian Democratic Party (Kristeleg Folkeparti)	2
Centre Party (Senterpartiet)	3
Socialist Left Party (Sosialistisk Venstreparti)	1
Liberal Party (Venstre)	1
Total number of members:	23

Bremanger kommunestyre 2003–2007
Party name (in Nynorsk)	Number of representatives
Labour Party (Arbeidarpartiet)	10
Progress Party (Framstegspartiet)	1
Conservative Party (Høgre)	4
Christian Democratic Party (Kristeleg Folkeparti)	2
Centre Party (Senterpartiet)	3
Socialist Left Party (Sosialistisk Venstreparti)	2
Liberal Party (Venstre)	1
Total number of members:	23

Bremanger kommunestyre 1999–2003
Party name (in Nynorsk)	Number of representatives
Labour Party (Arbeidarpartiet)	9
Conservative Party (Høgre)	6
Christian Democratic Party (Kristeleg Folkeparti)	2
Centre Party (Senterpartiet)	5
Liberal Party (Venstre)	1
Total number of members:	23

Bremanger kommunestyre 1995–1999
Party name (in Nynorsk)	Number of representatives
Labour Party (Arbeidarpartiet)	7
Conservative Party (Høgre)	3
Christian Democratic Party (Kristeleg Folkeparti)	2
Centre Party (Senterpartiet)	7
Socialist Left Party (Sosialistisk Venstreparti)	3
Liberal Party (Venstre)	1
Total number of members:	23

Bremanger kommunestyre 1991–1995
Party name (in Nynorsk)	Number of representatives
Labour Party (Arbeidarpartiet)	9
Conservative Party (Høgre)	6
Christian Democratic Party (Kristeleg Folkeparti)	3
Centre Party (Senterpartiet)	5
Socialist Left Party (Sosialistisk Venstreparti)	3
Liberal Party (Venstre)	1
Total number of members:	27

Bremanger kommunestyre 1987–1991
Party name (in Nynorsk)	Number of representatives
Labour Party (Arbeidarpartiet)	13
Conservative Party (Høgre)	9
Christian Democratic Party (Kristeleg Folkeparti)	4
Centre Party (Senterpartiet)	4
Socialist Left Party (Sosialistisk Venstreparti)	2
Liberal Party (Venstre)	1
Total number of members:	33

Bremanger kommunestyre 1983–1987
Party name (in Nynorsk)	Number of representatives
Labour Party (Arbeidarpartiet)	16
Conservative Party (Høgre)	7
Christian Democratic Party (Kristeleg Folkeparti)	5
Liberal People's Party (Liberale Folkepartiet)	1
Centre Party (Senterpartiet)	5
Socialist Left Party (Sosialistisk Venstreparti)	1
Liberal Party (Venstre)	2
Total number of members:	37

Bremanger kommunestyre 1979–1983
Party name (in Nynorsk)	Number of representatives
Labour Party (Arbeidarpartiet)	6
Conservative Party (Høgre)	5
Christian Democratic Party (Kristeleg Folkeparti)	3
New People's Party (Nye Folkepartiet)	1
Centre Party (Senterpartiet)	5
Liberal Party (Venstre)	2
Election list for Kalvåg and Bremanger (Valliste for Kalvåg og Bremanger)	11
Local list for Svelgen, Kjelkenes, and Nesbø (Kretsliste for Svelgen, Kjelkenes og Nesbø)	4
Total number of members:	37

Bremanger kommunestyre 1975–1979
Party name (in Nynorsk)	Number of representatives
Labour Party (Arbeidarpartiet)	7
Conservative Party (Høgre)	3
Christian Democratic Party (Kristeleg Folkeparti)	5
New People's Party (Nye Folkepartiet)	1
Centre Party (Senterpartiet)	6
Liberal Party (Venstre)	3
Election list for Kalvåg and Bremanger (Valliste for Kalvåg og Bremanger)	12
Total number of members:	37

Bremanger kommunestyre 1971–1975
Party name (in Nynorsk)	Number of representatives
Labour Party (Arbeidarpartiet)	6
Local List(s) (Lokale lister)	31
Total number of members:	37

Bremanger kommunestyre 1967–1971
Party name (in Nynorsk)	Number of representatives
Labour Party (Arbeidarpartiet)	6
Local List(s) (Lokale lister)	31
Total number of members:	37

Bremanger kommunestyre 1963–1967
Party name (in Nynorsk)	Number of representatives
Centre Party (Senterpartiet)	1
Local List(s) (Lokale lister)	28
Total number of members:	29

Bremanger heradsstyre 1959–1963
Party name (in Nynorsk)	Number of representatives
Labour Party (Arbeidarpartiet)	4
Conservative Party (Høgre)	1
Local List(s) (Lokale lister)	24
Total number of members:	29

Bremanger heradsstyre 1955–1959
Party name (in Nynorsk)	Number of representatives
Labour Party (Arbeidarpartiet)	1
List of workers, fishermen, and small farmholders (Arbeidarar, fiskarar, småbrukarar liste)	2
Local List(s) (Lokale lister)	26
Total number of members:	29

Bremanger heradsstyre 1951–1955
Party name (in Nynorsk)	Number of representatives
Labour Party (Arbeidarpartiet)	5
Liberal Party (Venstre)	12
Joint List(s) of Non-Socialist Parties (Borgarlege Felleslister)	5
Local List(s) (Lokale lister)	7
Total number of members:	29

Bremanger heradsstyre 1947–1951
Party name (in Nynorsk)	Number of representatives
Labour Party (Arbeidarpartiet)	8
Liberal Party (Venstre)	7
Joint List(s) of Non-Socialist Parties (Borgarlege Felleslister)	3
Local List(s) (Lokale lister)	11
Total number of members:	29

Bremanger heradsstyre 1945–1947
Party name (in Nynorsk)	Number of representatives
Labour Party (Arbeidarpartiet)	6
List of workers, fishermen, and small farmholders (Arbeidarar, fiskarar, småbrukarar liste)	3
Joint List(s) of Non-Socialist Parties (Borgarlege Felleslister)	4
Local List(s) (Lokale lister)	13
Total number of members:	26

Bremanger heradsstyre 1937–1941*
Party name (in Nynorsk)	Number of representatives
Labour Party (Arbeidarpartiet)	5
List of workers, fishermen, and small farmholders (Arbeidarar, fiskarar, småbrukarar liste)	10
Joint List(s) of Non-Socialist Parties (Borgarlege Felleslister)	4
Local List(s) (Lokale lister)	7
Total number of members:	26
Note: Due to the German occupation of Norway during World War II, no elections were held for new municipal councils until after the war ended in 1945.

=== Mayors ===
The mayor (Nynorsk: ordførar) of Bremanger Municipality is the political leader of the municipality and the chairperson of the municipal council. Here is a list of people who have held this position:

- 1866–1869: Rasmus Andreas Lexau
- 1870–1871: Gullak O. Vindspold
- 1872–1873: Nils S. Øvrebotten
- 1874–1875: Absalon Gulestøl
- 1876–1879: Nils S. Øvrebotten
- 1880–1891: Eilert O. Nøttingnes
- 1892–1898: Abraham N. Øvrebotnen
- 1899–1913: Kristofer Indrehus (V)
- 1913–1913: Didrik Værøy
- 1914–1914: Augustinus Nordbotten
- 1915–1916: Didrik Værøy
- 1917–1919: Augustinus Nordbotten
- 1920–1928: Henrik Grotle
- 1929–1941: Alf Torvanger
- 1945–1951: Alf Torvanger
- 1952–1959: Reidar Torvanger
- 1960–1965: Mons Monsen (Ap)
- 1966–1967: Alf Bakke (LL)
- 1968–1979: Abraham Øvrebotten (Ap)
- 1980–1981: Bjarne Haugland (V)
- 1982–1988: Svein Kåre Senneset (Ap)
- 1988–1996: Roar Førde (H)
- 1996–2004: Einar Kjerpeset (Sp)
- 2004–2011: Kåre Olav Svarstad (Ap)
- 2011–2015: Karl Vidar Førde (Sp)
- 2015–2019: Audun Åge Røys (H)
- 2019–present: Anne Kristin Førde (Ap)

== Geography ==
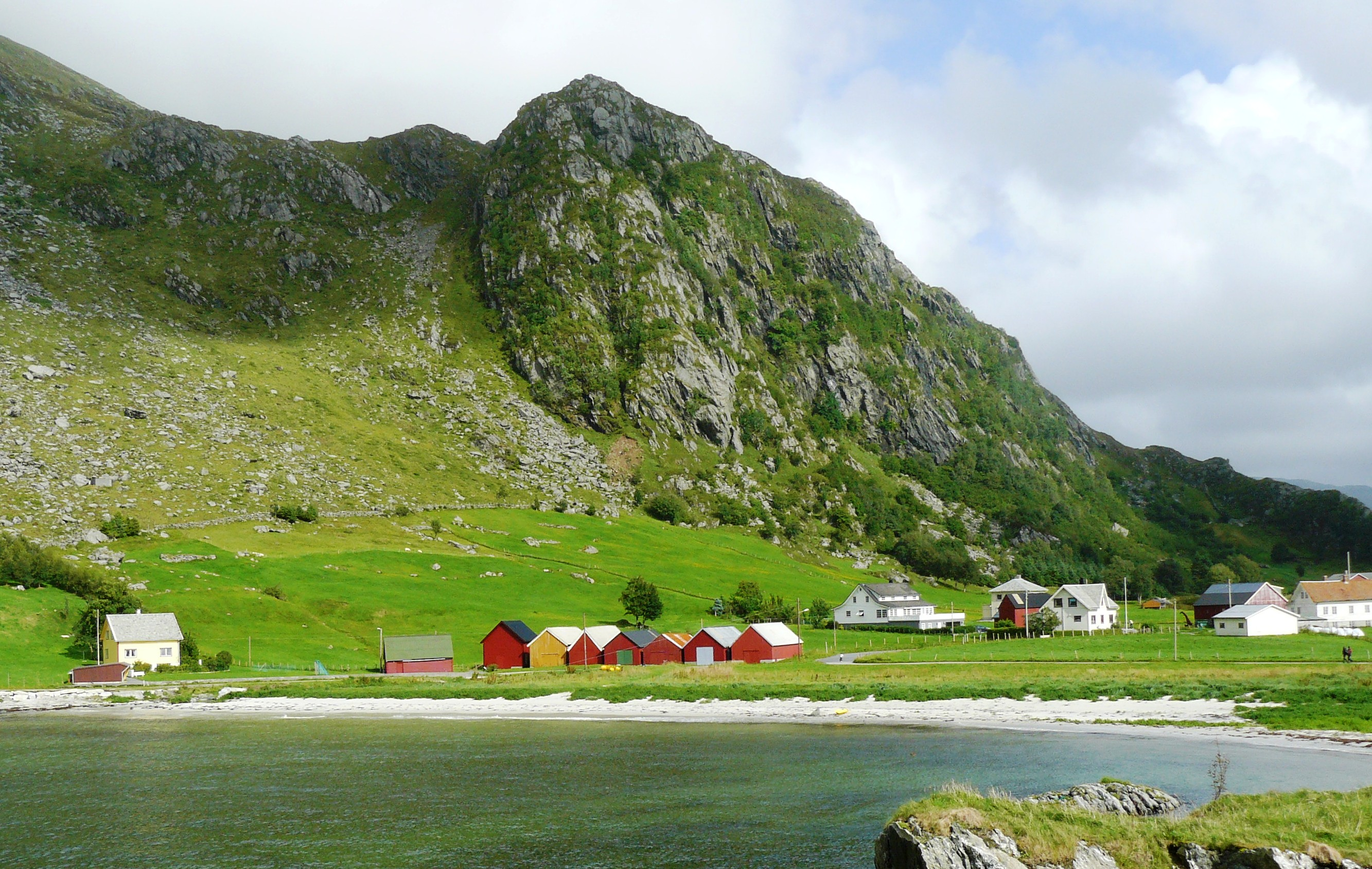
Grotlesanden

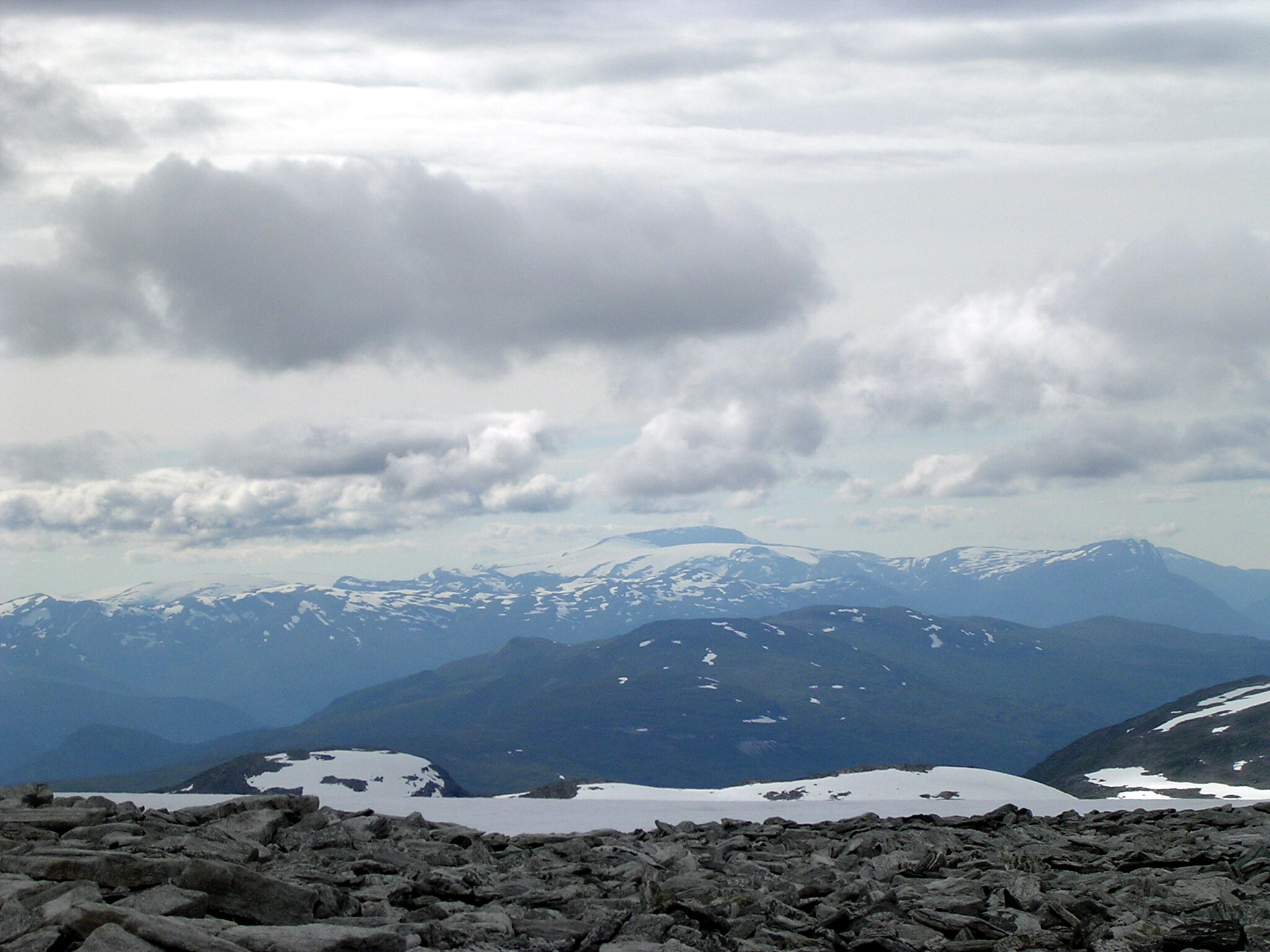
The mountain Blånibba. Seen from the glacier Myklebustbreen.

Bremanger is located along the south side of the Nordfjorden. Most of the municipality is on the mainland, but there are many islands that are also part of the municipality including Bremangerlandet, Rugsundøya, and Frøya, the three largest. These islands are separated from the mainland by the Frøysjøen strait.

Bremanger is bordered to the north by Kinn Municipality and Stad Municipality (across the fjord), to the east by Gloppen Municipality, to the south by Kinn Municipality, and to the west by the North Sea. The highest point in the municipality is the 1,670.26-metre (5,479.9 ft) tall mountain Gjegnen.

The Frøysjøen is the strait between the mainland and the main islands of Bremangerlandet and Frøya. The Gulen fjord branches off of the Frøysjøen, and that fjord splits off into the Nordgulen, Midtgulen, and Sørgulen. On the east end of the municipality is the Isefjord and Ålfotfjorden. Valleys in the municipality include the Førdedalen.

== Climate ==
All villages in Bremanger have an oceanic climate (Cfb). The islands of Bremangerlandet and Frøya have the mildest winter temperatures, least precipitation and most wind. On the west coast of the main land, such as in Svelgen, the average winter temperatures are a few degrees colder, but still above zero, and there is less wind. Svelgen receives more precipitation per year than Bergen and Førde. The east side of the municipality is slightly drier again, but still receives over 2000 mm of precipitation per year.

Late spring/early summer is the driest part of the year, while winter is the wettest. The eastern of the municipality receives significantly less precipitation during the spring and summer as the other parts, but the winter precipitation amounts are similar. The diurnal temperature variation is usually small, especially during the winter, thanks to the surrounding water.

Climate data for Svelgen II 1991–2020 (16 m)
Month	Jan	Feb	Mar	Apr	May	Jun	Jul	Aug	Sep	Oct	Nov	Dec	Year
Daily mean °C (°F)	3.1 (37.6)	2.6 (36.7)	3.6 (38.5)	6.6 (43.9)	9.8 (49.6)	12.8 (55.0)	15.2 (59.4)	14.8 (58.6)	12.8 (55.0)	8.2 (46.8)	5.5 (41.9)	3.4 (38.1)	8.2 (46.8)
Average precipitation mm (inches)	285 (11.2)	249 (9.8)	225 (8.9)	152 (6.0)	139 (5.5)	128 (5.0)	144 (5.7)	214 (8.4)	298 (11.7)	300 (11.8)	303 (11.9)	316 (12.4)	2,753 (108.3)
Average precipitation days (≥ 1.0 mm)	20	18	18	15	15	14	15	17	18	19	18	20	207
Source: NOAA WMO averages 91-2020 Norway

Climate data for Ålfoten II 1991–2020 (24 m)
Month	Jan	Feb	Mar	Apr	May	Jun	Jul	Aug	Sep	Oct	Nov	Dec	Year
Average precipitation mm (inches)	292.2 (11.50)	244.2 (9.61)	208.3 (8.20)	123.3 (4.85)	108.0 (4.25)	101.7 (4.00)	98.7 (3.89)	144.9 (5.70)	219.0 (8.62)	258.5 (10.18)	265.3 (10.44)	319.7 (12.59)	2,383.8 (93.83)
Average precipitation days (≥ 1.0 mm)	19	17	17	13	14	13	14	16	17	18	18	20	196
Source: NOAA WMO averages 91-2020 Norway

Climate data for Daviknes 1991–2020 (78 m)
Month	Jan	Feb	Mar	Apr	May	Jun	Jul	Aug	Sep	Oct	Nov	Dec	Year
Average precipitation mm (inches)	285.2 (11.23)	241.5 (9.51)	221.1 (8.70)	130.3 (5.13)	115.8 (4.56)	108.3 (4.26)	110.3 (4.34)	158.9 (6.26)	247.5 (9.74)	259.0 (10.20)	267.0 (10.51)	315.8 (12.43)	2,460.7 (96.87)
Average precipitation days (≥ 1.0 mm)	18	17	17	13	13	13	13	16	17	17	17	19	190
Source: NOAA WMO averages 91-2020 Norway

== Industry ==
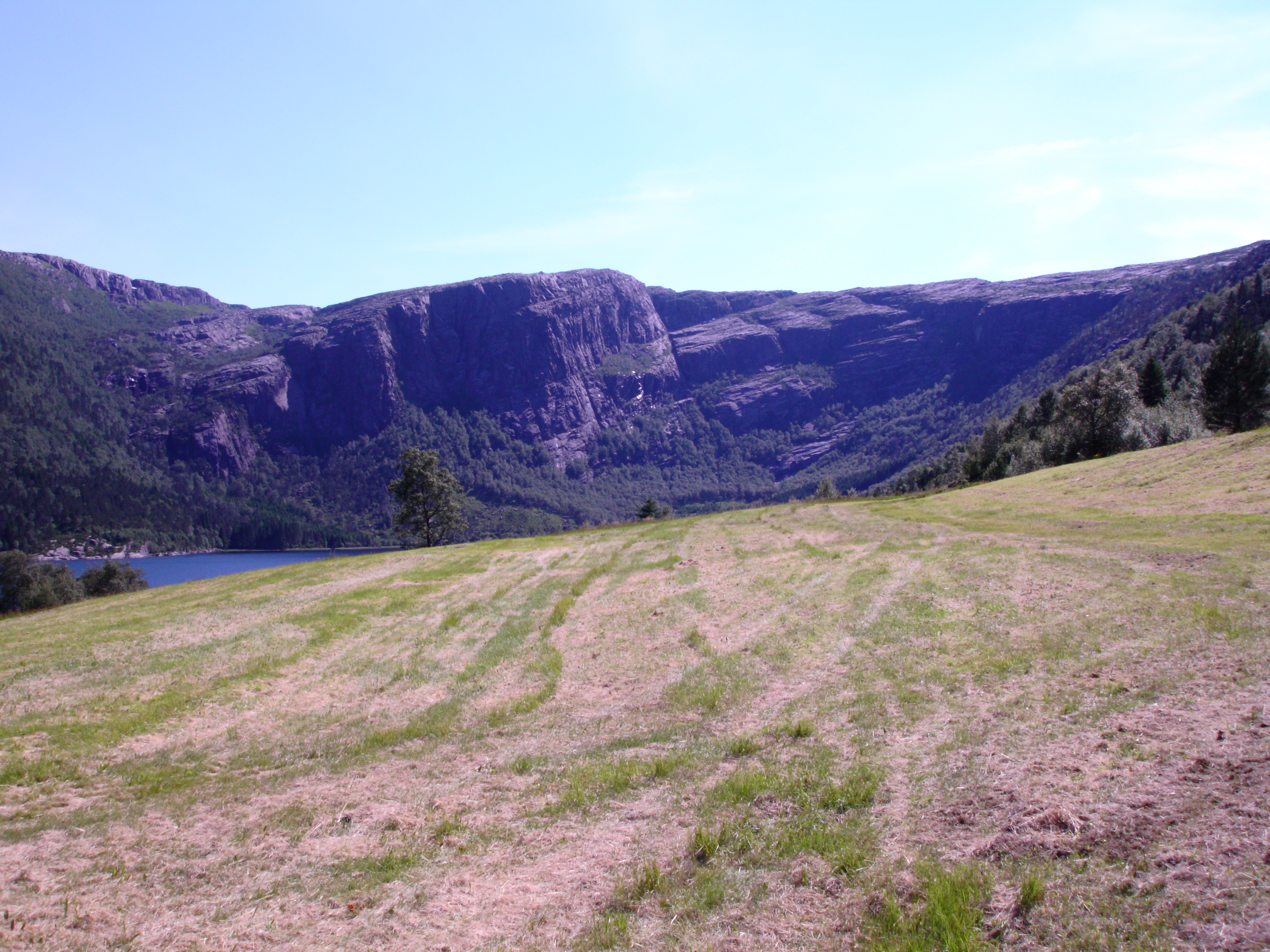
Vindspollen

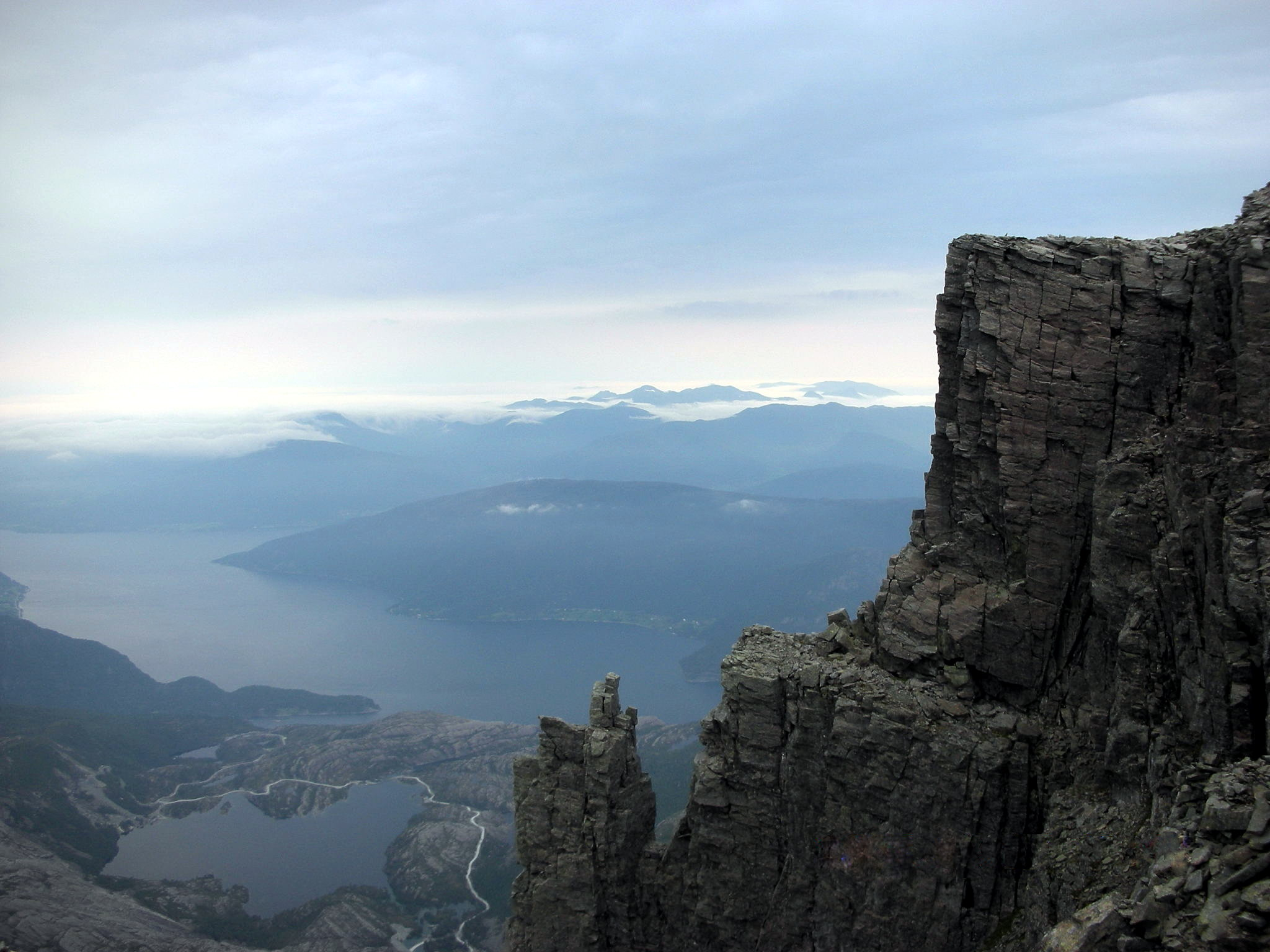
The high cliff on the west side of Gjegnen mountain. It is called "Galleriet". The cliff is from the west side of Gjegnen to Bjørndalsvatnet.

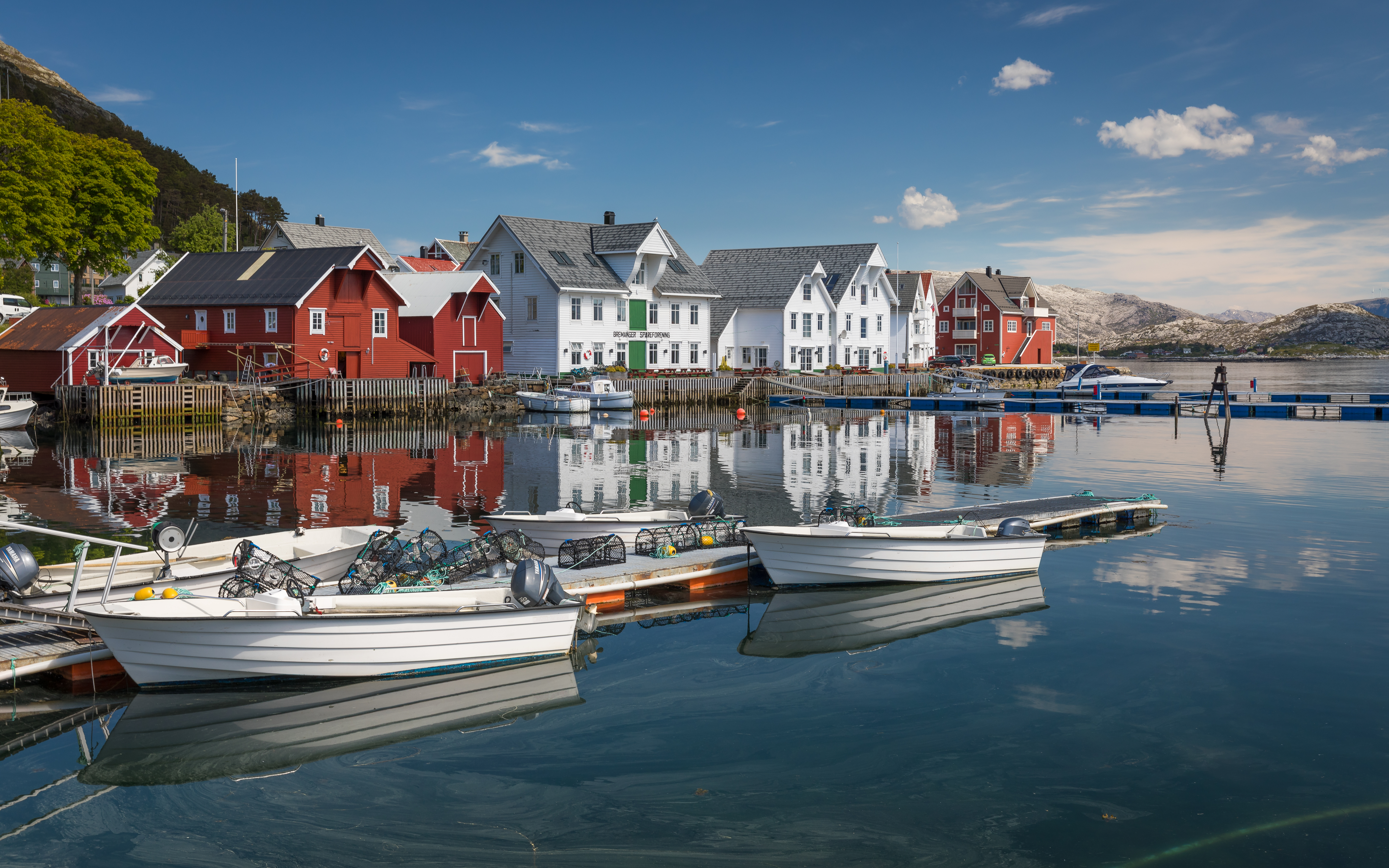
Kalvåg harbour in Bremanger Municipality, Vestland, Norway.

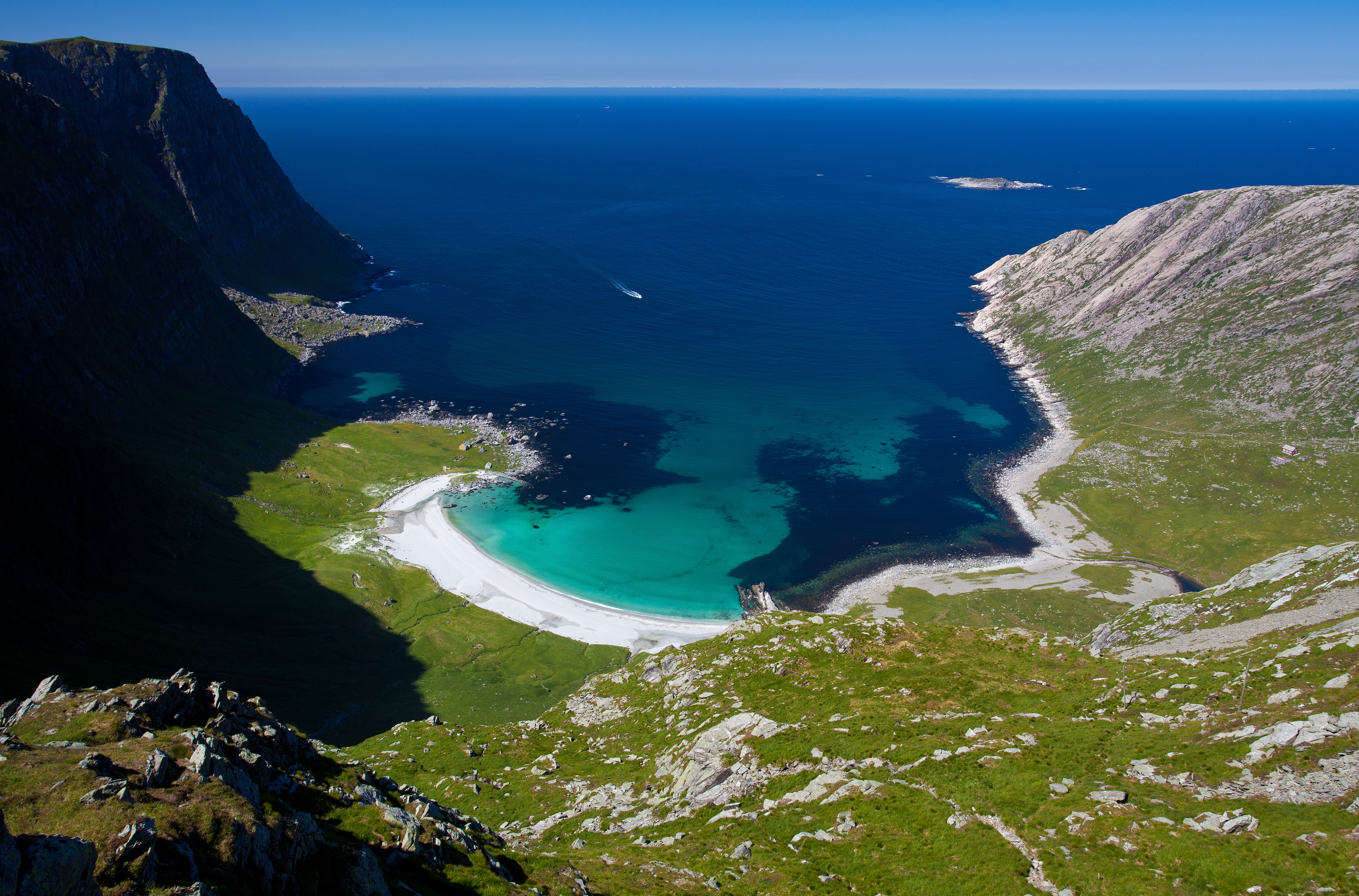
Vetvika beach on the northwestern side of Bremangerlandet in Bremanger Municipality, Norway.

Elkem Bremanger is the largest company in Bremanger. The company's own port facility provides good and regular connections with the main ports of Norway and the rest of Europe. Elkem Bremanger has specialized in the manufacturing of silicon metal, ferrosilicon, and specialty inoculants. Silicon metals are primarily used in electronics, solar, and aluminium industries.

The variety of Elkem Bremanger's operations shows the importance it places on both tradition and looking toward the future. The expansion of hydropower resources began in 1917, while the first pig iron production began in 1928. The company then developed and patented several of its production processes, and today manufactures metallurgic products and chemicals for the world market. Much has happened since 1917, but the company is still known for its developmental know-how and state-of-the-art technology.

Russian hackers made a cyberattack on April 7, 2025. They opened a flood gate of the dam in Bremanger, released 500 litres of water per second for four hours.

== Attractions ==
=== Tongane Coastal Fortress ===
Tongane Coastal Fortress lies on the western end of the island of Rugsundøya near the mouth of the Nordfjorden. This is one of the largest German fortifications which was built in Norway during World War II. The coastal fort was attacked under the well-known Måløy raid, Operation Archery, during Christmas 1941. The majority of the fortification still remains, among other the main cannons and soldier's barracks. The fort at Rugsundøy is situated with a good view over the approach to the town of Måløy and the entrance to Nordfjorden.

=== Ålfotbreen Glacier ===
The Ålfotbreen glacier, the westernmost glacier in Norway, is located at an elevation of 1,682 metres (5,518 ft) above sea level. Ålfotbreen Glacier can be reached by foot on marked footpaths or walking with a guide. Ålfotbreen Glacier can be seen from the road in the village of Ålfoten. The Gjegnalundsbreen glacier lies northeast of the Ålfotbreen glacier.

=== Hornelen ===
The legendary mountain cliff Hornelen is situated straight across the fjord from Vingen rock carving site. Many legends are linked to this mountain which is Europe's tallest sea cliff. It raises 860 metres (2,820 ft) over the sea and is a good landmark for ships. Over the centuries, it has been a well-known sailing mark. The trip to the top of Hornelen takes approximately 3 hours from Hunskår, or 4 hours from Berleneset.

=== Kalvåg ===
The fishing village of Kalvåg is the largest and best preserved fishing village in Western Norway. In 1860, there were thousands of people working in the large herring fisheries. Today, approximately 500 people live there.

Vamråkbuene is situated in Kalvåg. During the large herring fisheries in the middle of the 18th century, thousands of fishermen visited Kalvåg. Vamråkbuene represents one part of the trading life that the herring fisheries created, and today it is part of the Coastal museum in Vestland.

=== Myklebust Farm ===
At the Myklebust hill farm, there is still a working hill farm. The hill farm in Ålfoten is authentic and unique in this part of Norway. Many of the local hill farms have stopped running and following the tradition of moving the livestock to the hill farms in the summer.

=== Rugsund ===
Rugsund is a harbour near the coastal inner shipping fairway, shelterd by the islands of Storøya and Litleøya ("big island" and "little island") in the sound. Rugsund Handelsstad is a preserved trading post dated back to the 17th century. The historical and restored buildings are clustered around the edge of the sea. Today, the harbour is a popular destination for tourists arriving by boat.

=== Smørhavn Handelstad ===
Smørhamn Handelstad (Old Trading Post) is from the 16th century and has been an important junction point for clippers and cutters (sailing boats) between Nordfjord and Bergen. The trading post was important to fishermen and to local inhabitants in the area. Here you could buy everything from sharpening stones, pins, syrup to soap, together with beer and distilled spirits. In 1790, there were approximately 30 houses in Smørhamn. Today, there are a few boat houses and houses. Presently, Smørhamn Handelstad is privately owned and not open to tourists. You can see the trading post from the road and from the sea approximately 4 km from the centre of Kalvåg.

=== Vingen ===
The Rock carvings at Vingen is one of the largest rock carving sites in Northern Europe. Animal carvings, human figures, and many other abstract symbols are sketched on the mountains. The oldest dates back 4,500 years. In all, more than 1,500 figures are registered. Vingen has probably been a cultist meeting place in the region for thousands of years.

=== Botnane ===
There are altogether 8 grave mounds dating back to early Stone Age and Bronze Age. Because some of them are so large, it's easy to see them from the road.

=== Historic churches ===
==== Ålfoten Church ====
Ålfoten Church is the oldest wooden church in Nordfjord. The log timber church was built in 1610 on the site of an earlier stave church. In the small church, its history is still on the walls, which is a testimony to life and destiny of the remote fjord through the ages.

==== Rugsund Church ====
Rugsund Church was built in the beginning of the 1930s and was designed by Hans Ditlev F. Linstow. The design of the church includes various decorations such as wall paintings, glass mosaics, and carvings.

==== Vicarage ====
The poet-priest Claus Frimann lived and worked in Davik. Frimann (1780–1822) established a reading room for the village's young men and women. But he didn't just carry out unselfish activities. In his official capacity he also looked after the large estate and was also known to be rather zealous in collection of debts and land taxes. Frimann is best known as a "poet priest" and he has often been mentioned in the same connection as Petter Dass. The vicarage is situated on the priest's farm estate. Here you can see a memorial column to Claus Frimann at the church.

=== Beaches ===
Grotlesanden is one of the largest sandy beaches in outer Bremanger. Here there is silky soft sand as far as the eye can see.

Vetvika is situated on the north-western side of Bremangerlandet island. Vetvika is accessible only by boat or foot. Vetvika has a beautiful sandy beach and an old graveyard. Vetvika is deserted since the 1950s, but the houses still remain well kept as holiday houses. The largest farm in Bremanger in early times was the farm Solheim at Vetvika. The farm is situated on the northern side of Vetvika.

== Notable people ==
- Nikolai Astrup (1880–1928), a distinctive, innovative painter with intense use of colour
- Arvid Eikevik (1935–2015), a Norwegian painter
- Bjørg Hope Galtung (born 1942), a Norwegian politician and Mayor of Jondal Municipality from 1979-1993
- Åge Nigardsøy (1954–2008), a disability rights activist, hobby drummer, and former piano tuner
