= Ålfoten =

Village in Bremanger Municipality, Norway

- Village
- Interactive map of Ålfoten
- Location within Vestland Location within Norway
- Coordinates: 61.8393°N 5.6762°E
- Country: Norway
- Region: Western Norway
- County: Vestland
- District: Nordfjord
- Municipality: Bremanger Municipality
- Time zone: UTC+01:00 (CET)
  - Summer (DST): UTC+02:00 (CEST)
- Post Code: 6737

Ålfoten is a village in Bremanger Municipality in Vestland county, Norway. The village is located along the Ålfotfjorden, a branch of the main Nordfjorden. The village has a population of about 200.

The village has an elementary school, a grocery store, and the Ålfoten Church (built in 1678). Ålfoten has two hydroelectric power stations nearby: Åskåra and Yksneelvane.

Ålfoten is surrounded by mountains. To the south: Høgefjellet, Bukkenibba and Blånibba. To the north: Nakken, Kårnyken, Kvasshornet and Klakegga. The Ålfotbreen glacier lies about 10 kilometres (6.2 mi) to the southwest of the village.

== Gallery ==
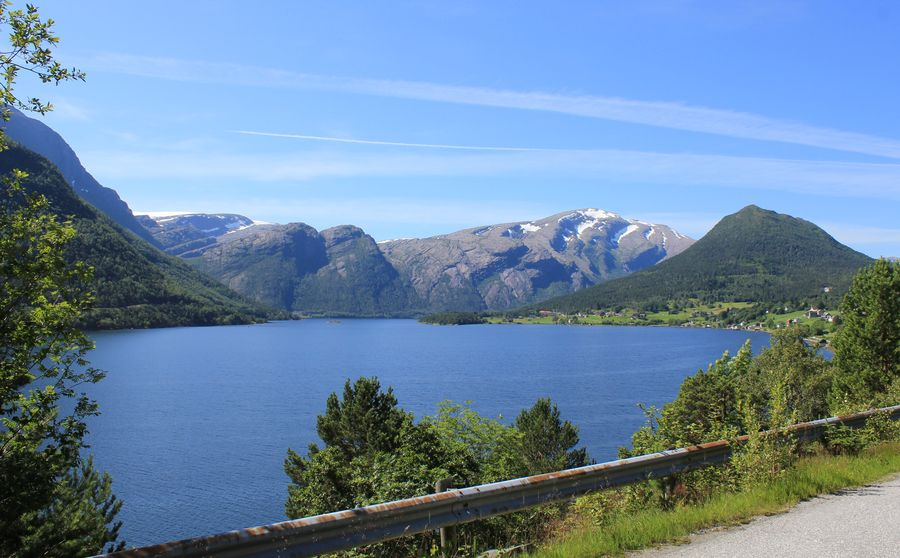
Ålfoten

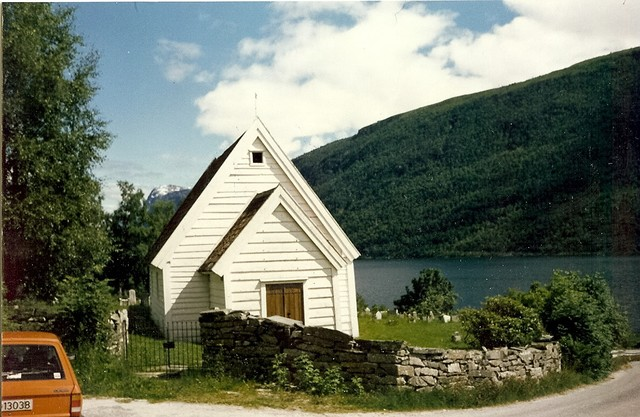
Ålfoten church

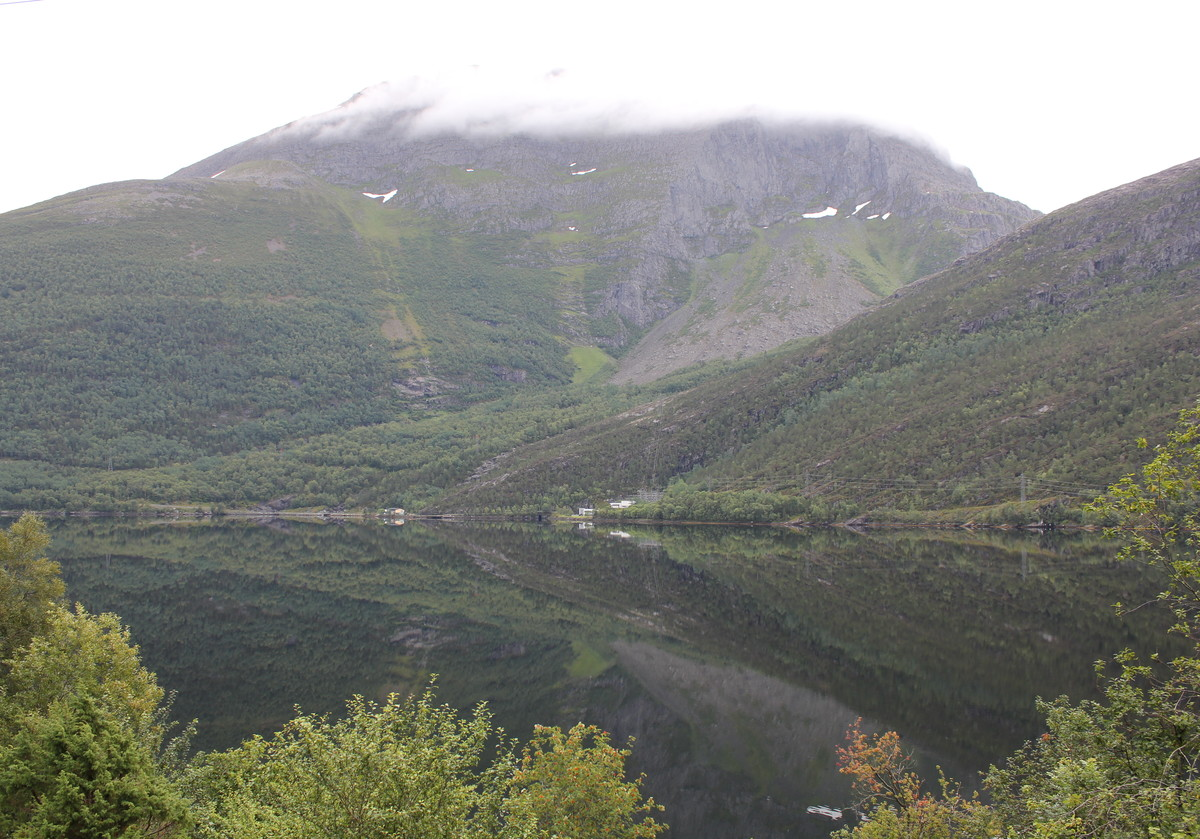
Mountain Høgefjellet

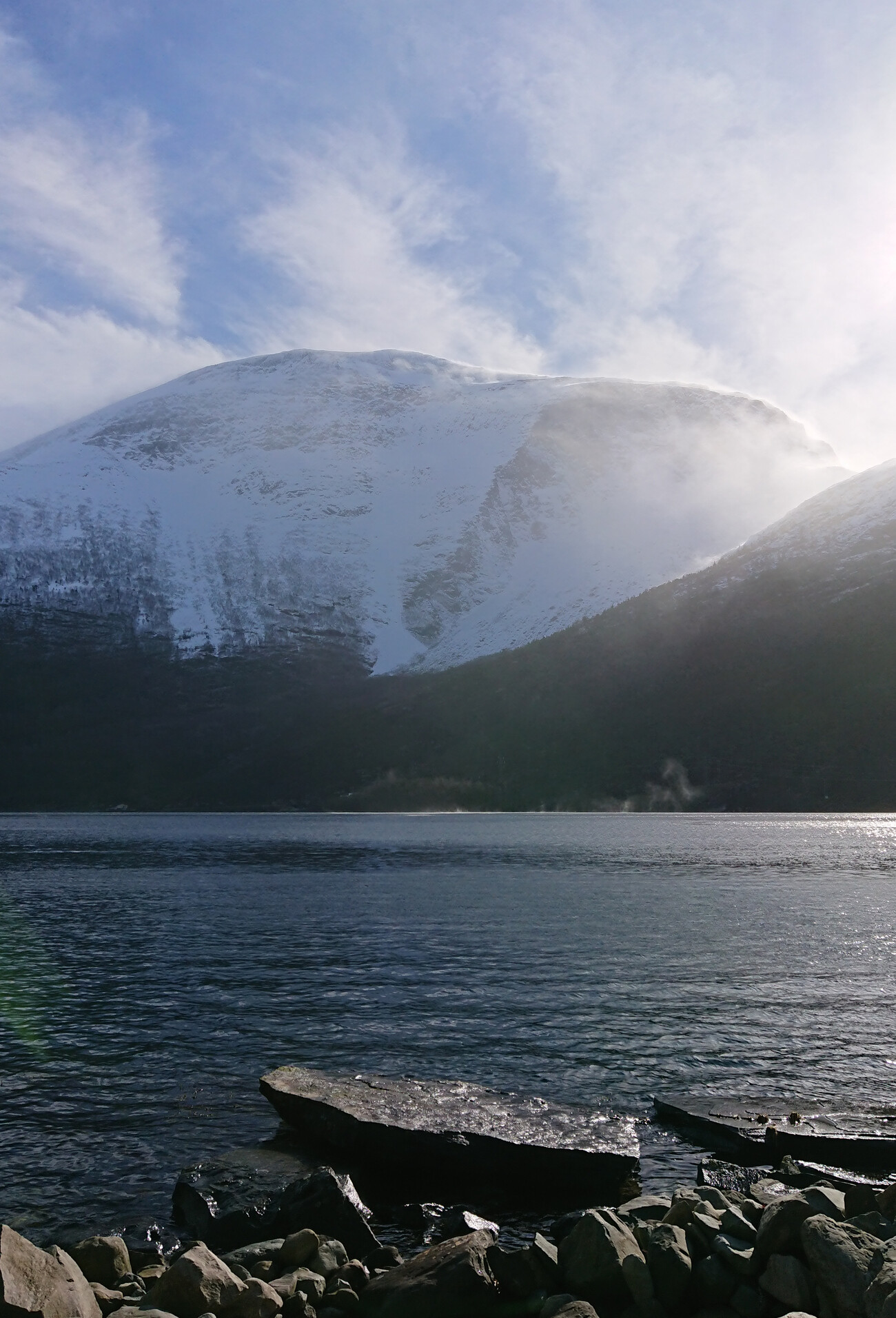
Mountain Høgefjellet

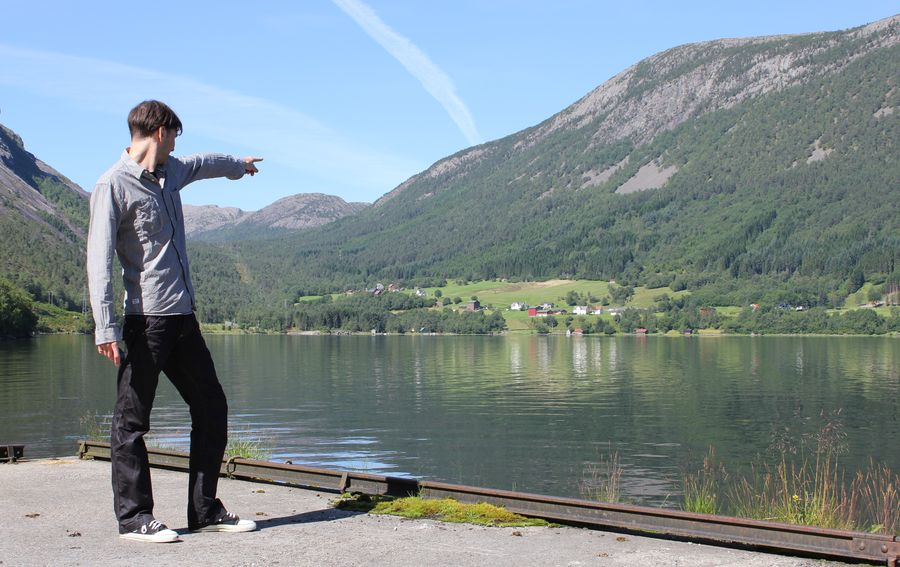
Mountain Nakken

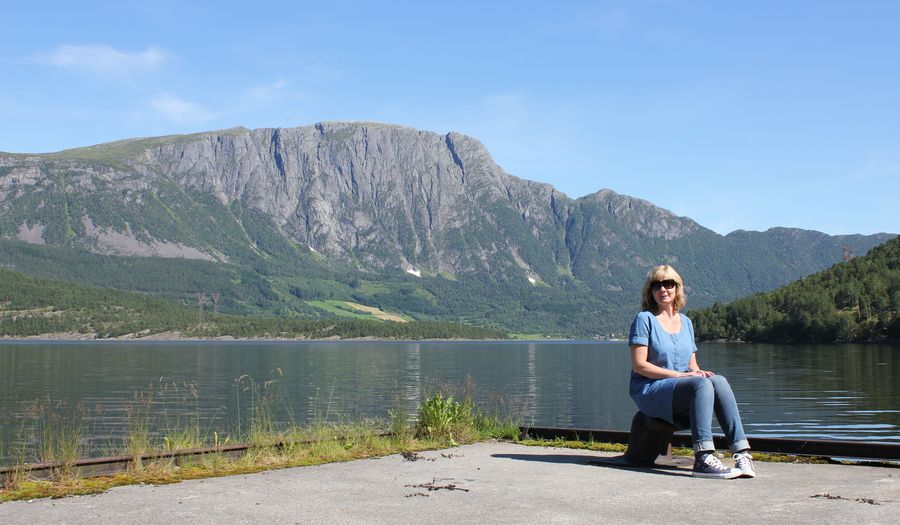
Mountain Kårnykjen

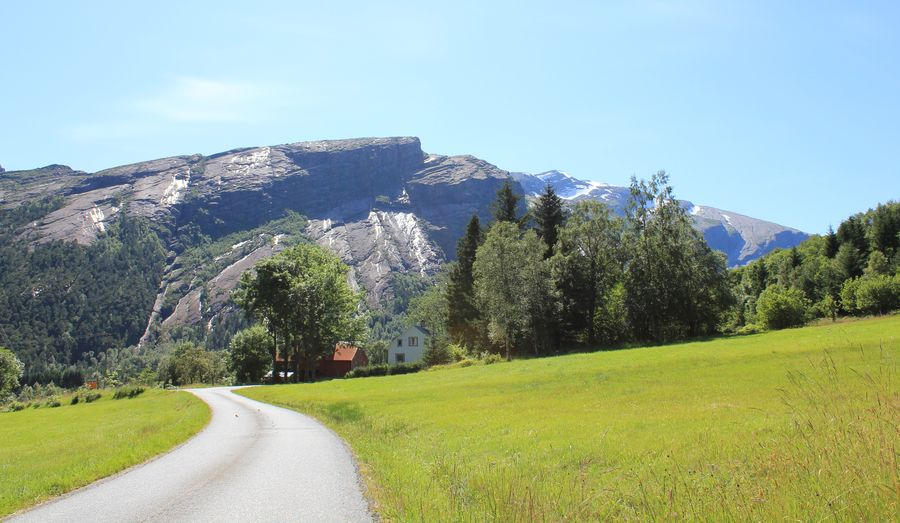
Føre

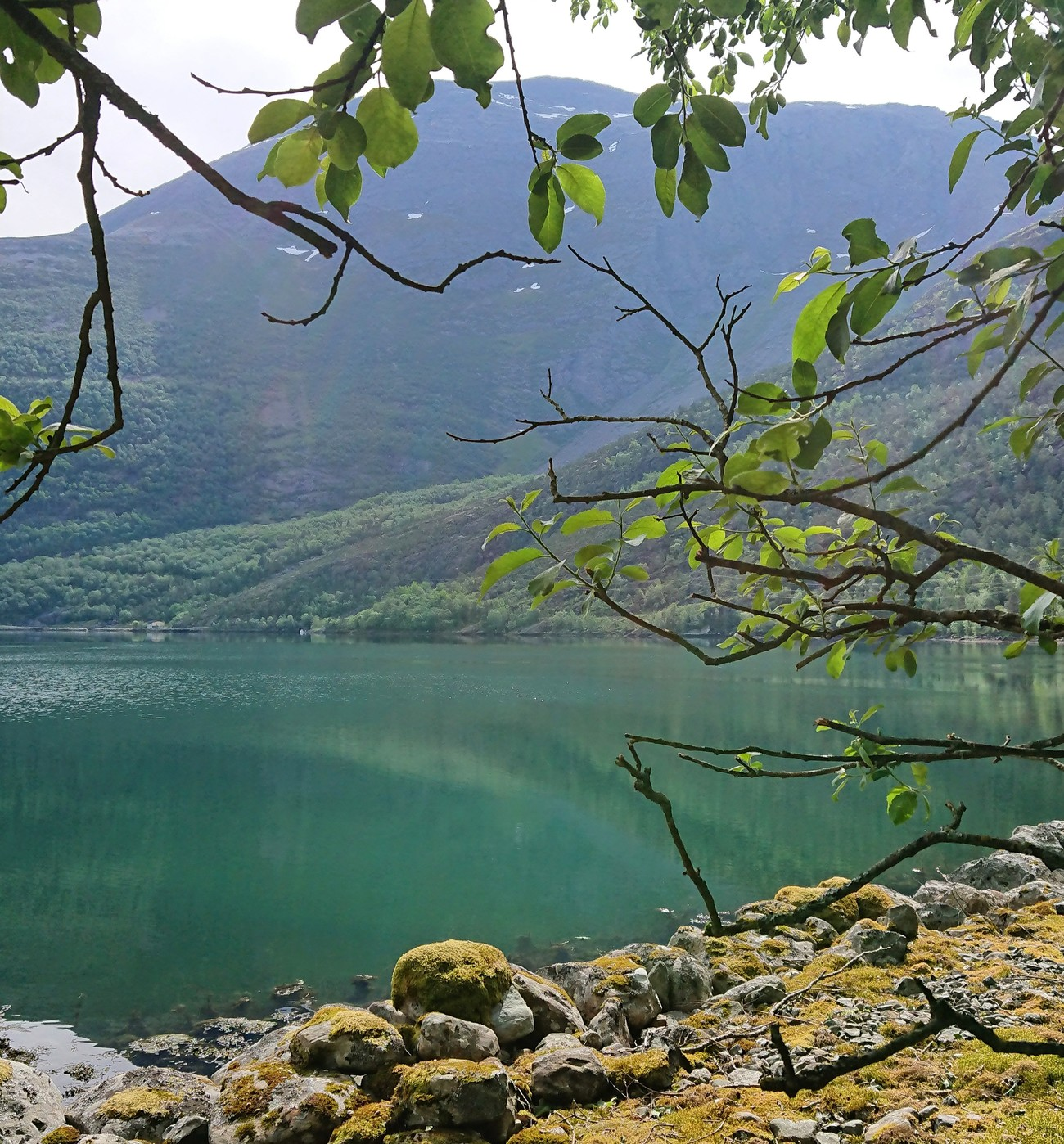
Føre

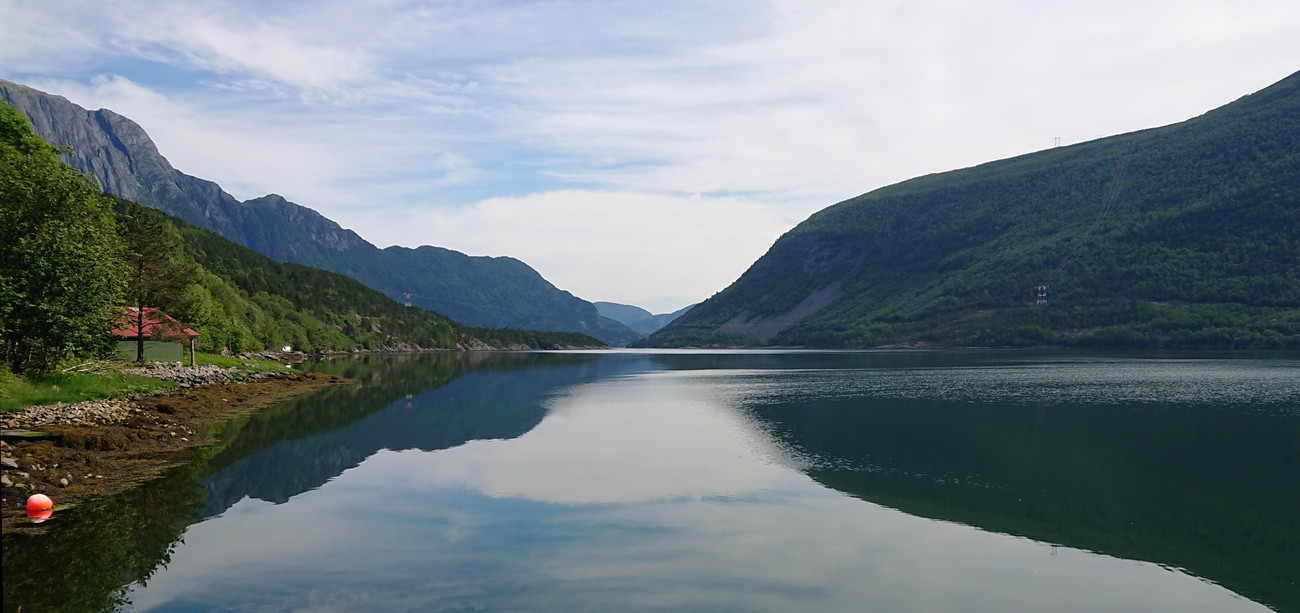
Føre
