= Åge Nigardsøy =

Norwegian activist

Åge Johan Nigardsøy (1954 – 20 October 2008) was a Norwegian organizational leader and disability rights activist.

He was born in Bremanger Municipality, and moved to Trondheim after school. He was hired by the Norwegian Association of the Blind and Partially Sighted, running a local radio station in Trondheim. He became active in the organization, and was elected deputy chairman in 1999. From 2001 to 2007 he chaired the organization. He stepped down because of illness, and died in October 2008. He was also a board member of the foundation which issues Klar Tale as well as the Norwegian Library of Talking Books and Braille until his death.

Nigardsøy was married and had two sons. He was a hobby drummer, and also worked as a piano tuner in his younger days.
