= Rugsund =

Village in Bremanger Municipality, Norway

- Village
- Interactive map of Rugsund
- Location within Vestland Location within Norway
- Coordinates: 61.8879°N 5.3314°E
- Country: Norway
- Region: Western Norway
- County: Vestland
- District: Nordfjord
- Municipality: Bremanger Municipality
- Elevation: 4 m (13 ft)
- Time zone: UTC+01:00 (CET)
  - Summer (DST): UTC+02:00 (CEST)
- Post Code: 6734 Rugsund

Rugsund is a village in Bremanger Municipality in Vestland county, Norway. The village is located on the mainland along the shore of the Nordfjorden. The village is home to Rugsund Church, the local church for this part of the municipality. There has been a church here, serving the Rugsund parish since the Middle Ages.

There is a bridge on the south side of the village that connects the mainland to the island of Rugsundøya, just to the west. That island in turn is connected to the island of Bremangerlandet by the Skatestraum Tunnel, so all residents of western Bremanger must pass through Rugsund to get to the mainland.

== Media gallery ==
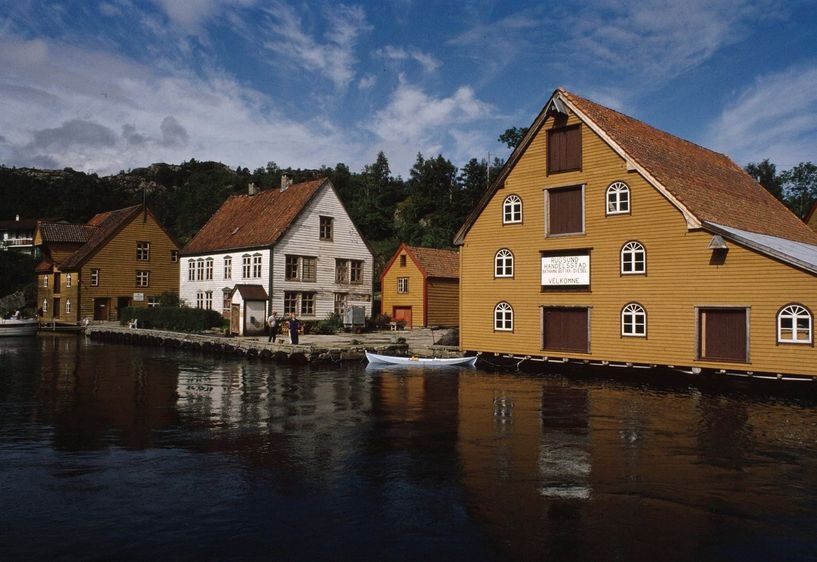

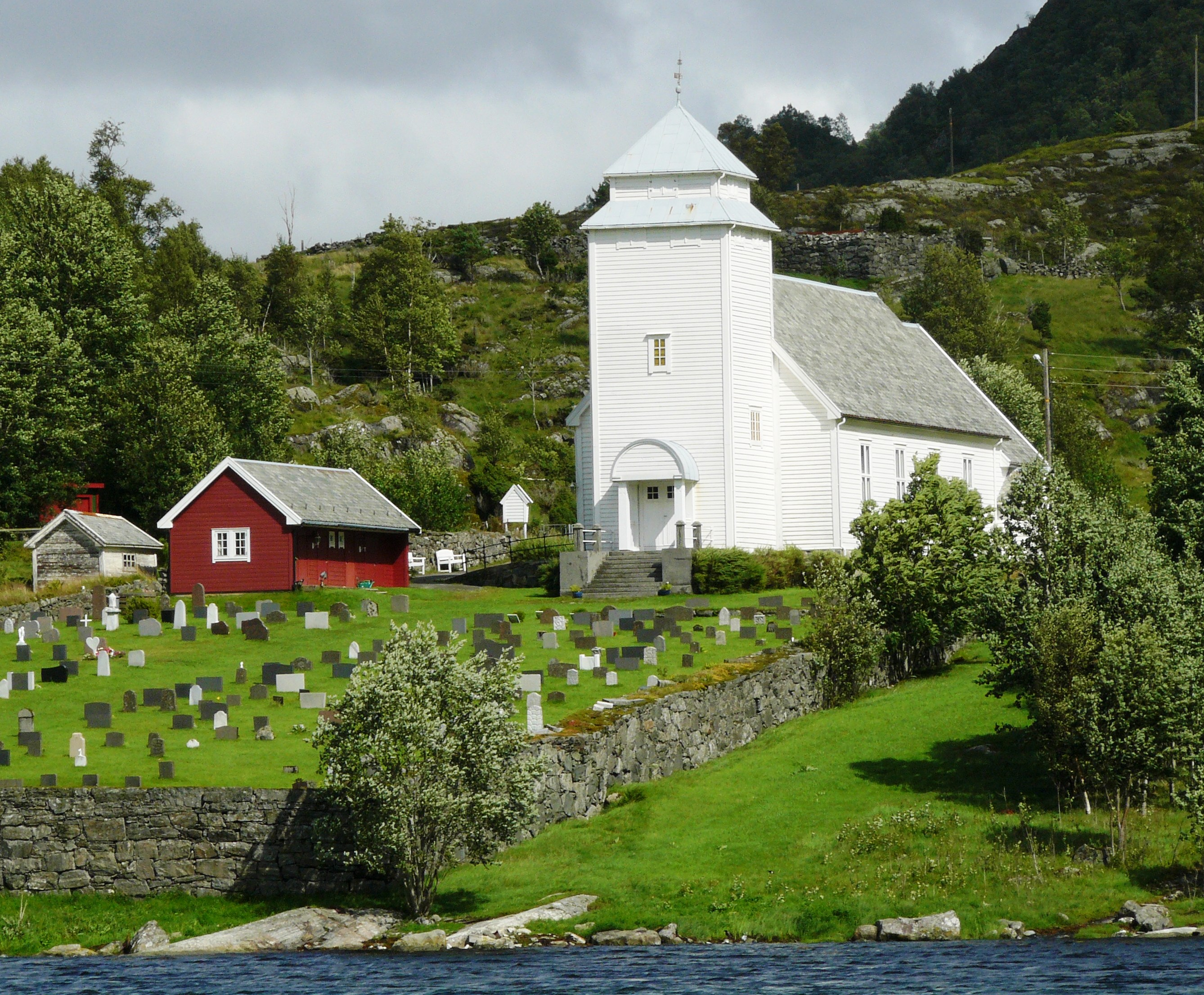

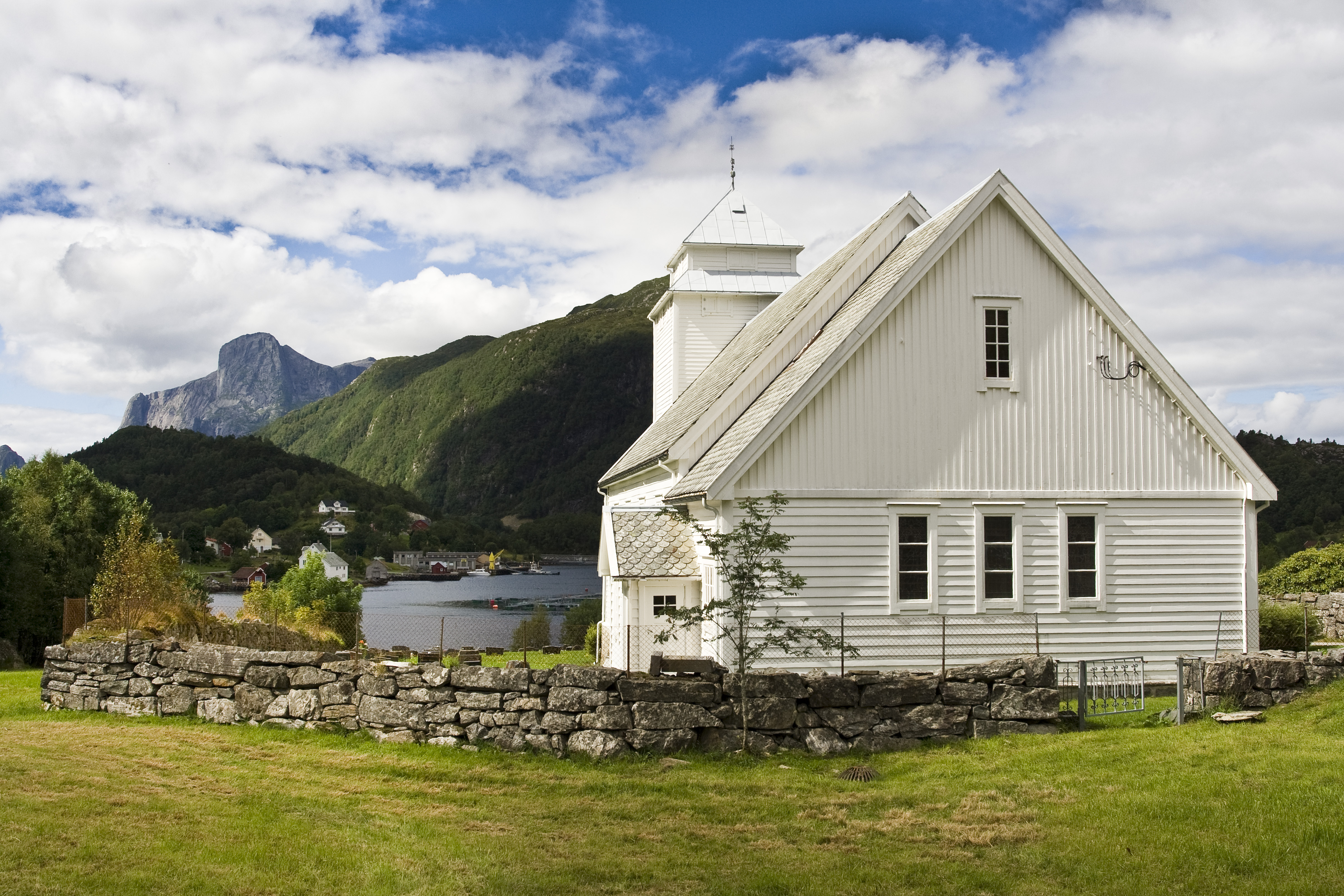
