= Blånibba =

Mountain in Bremanger, Norway

Blånibba Gjegnen
- Uksen / Gjegnalunden
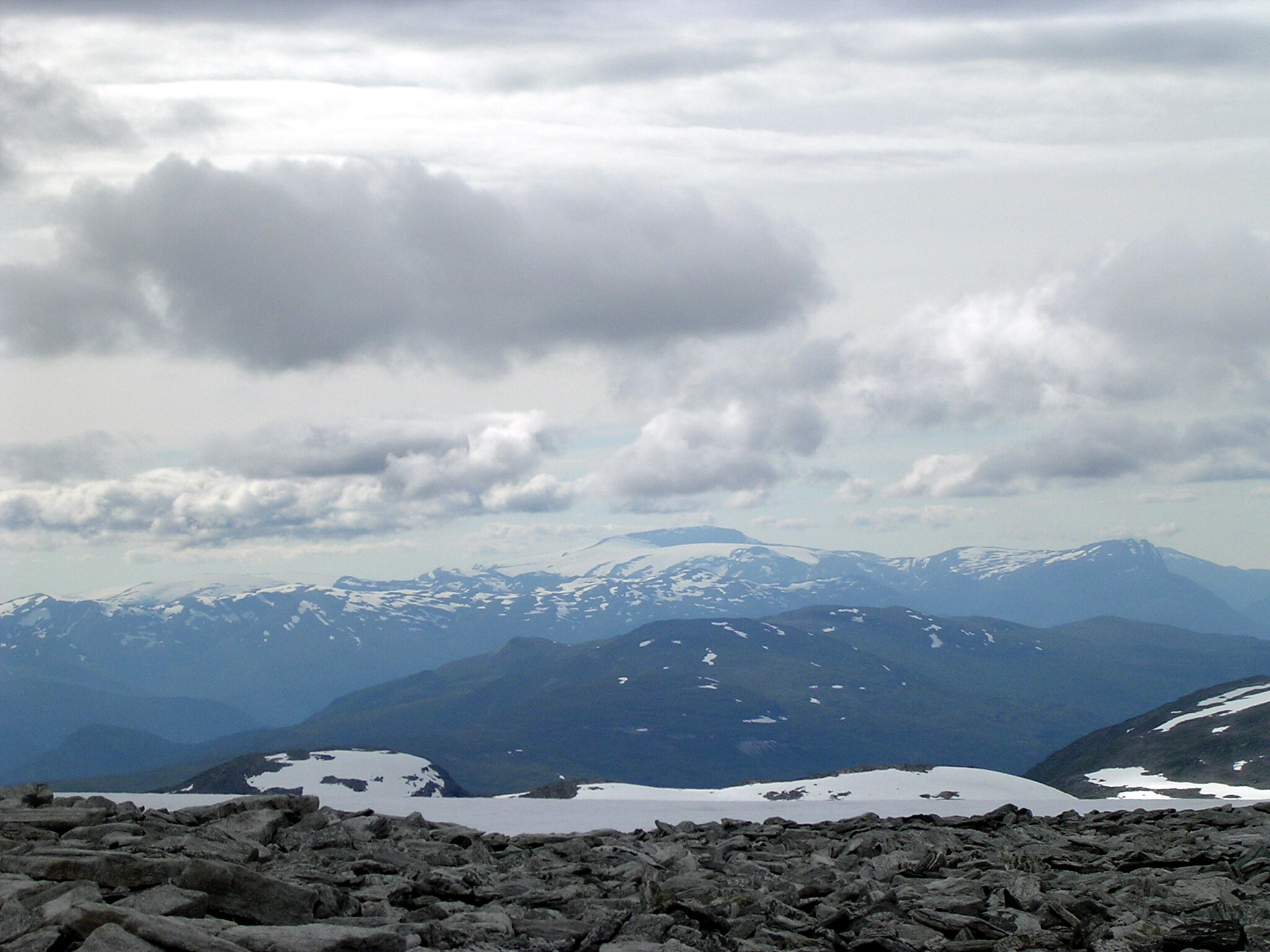
- Blånibba/Gjegnen seen from the glacier Myklebustbreen.

Highest point
- Elevation: 1,670 m (5,480 ft)
- Prominence: 1,460 m (4,790 ft)
- Isolation: 47.8 km (29.7 mi)
- Listing: #5 at List of mountains in Norway by prominence
- Coordinates: 61°48′09″N 5°49′22″E

Geography
- Interactive map of the mountain
- Location: Vestland, Norway
- Topo map: 1218 IV Ålfoten

Geology
- Rock age: Devonian
- Rock type: Sandstone

Blånibba or Gjegnen is the highest mountain in Bremanger Municipality in Vestland county, Norway. The 1,670-metre-tall (5,480 ft) mountain has a topographic prominence of 1,460 metres (4,790 ft), the fifth-highest prominence in Norway. The glacier Gjegnalundsbreen lies directly to the east of the mountain. The mountain is about 10 kilometres (6.2 mi) southeast of the village of Ålfoten in Bremanger Municipality and about 22 kilometres (14 mi) northwest of the village of Sandane in neighboring Gloppen Municipality.

== Names ==
The name Gjegnen is a definite noun derived from the adjective gjegn which means "straight" or "direct". The top of this prominent mountain was used to find and hold the direction for travelers. The alternate name Blånibba is a compound of the words blå ("blue") and the definite form of nibbe (mountain peak). The names Gjegnen and Blånibba are both official names of the mountain. Uksen and Gjegnalunden are also approved names, but they are not prioritized. The spellings Gjegnet and Jegnen are sometimes used, but they are not approved, official names of the mountain.

== See also ==
- List of mountains of Norway
- Hornelen Basin
