= Storebru =

Coordinates: 61°34′28″N 5°32′35″E

- Village
- Location in Norway
- Country: Norway
- Region: Western Norway
- County: Vestland
- Municipality: Kinn

Area
  - Total: 1.06 km^{2} (0.41 sq mi)

Population (2023)
  - Total: 1,030
  - Density: 972/km^{2} (2,520/sq mi)
- Time zone: UTC+01:00 (CET)
  - Summer (DST): UTC+02:00 (CEST)
- Post Code: 6690 Aure

Storebru is a village in Kinn Municipality, located in Vestland county, Norway.

== See also ==
- Møre og Romsdal
- Norway
