= Skatestraum Tunnel =

Tunnel in Bremanger, Norway

- Interactive map of Skatestraum Tunnel

Overview
- Location: Bremanger Municipality, Norway
- Coordinates: 61°52′27″N 5°12′49″E
- Route: Fv616
- Start: Bremangerlandet island
- End: Rugsunøya island

Operation
- Opened: 12 July 2002
- Operator: Statens vegvesen
- Traffic: Automotive

Technical
- Length: 1,901 m (6,237 ft)
- No. of lanes: 2
- Min elevation: −91 m (−299 ft)

The Skatestraum Tunnel (Norwegian: Skatestraumtunnelen) is a subsea road tunnel between the islands of Rugsundøya and Bremangerlandet in Bremanger Municipality in Vestland county, Norway. The tunnel was the first undersea road tunnel in Sogn og Fjordane county when it was built.

It is 1,901 meters (6,237 ft) long and it reaches a depth of 91 meters (299 ft) below sea level. It is part of County Road 616. It opened on 12 July 2002 and cost 325 million kr to build, including auxiliary roads.

On 15 July 2015 a tank truck crashed in the tunnel. The tunnel was closed and evacuated since there was a risk the tunnel would be flooded. It was reopened in December 2015.
