= Hyen =

Village in Gloppen Municipality, Norway

Hyen Straume
- Village
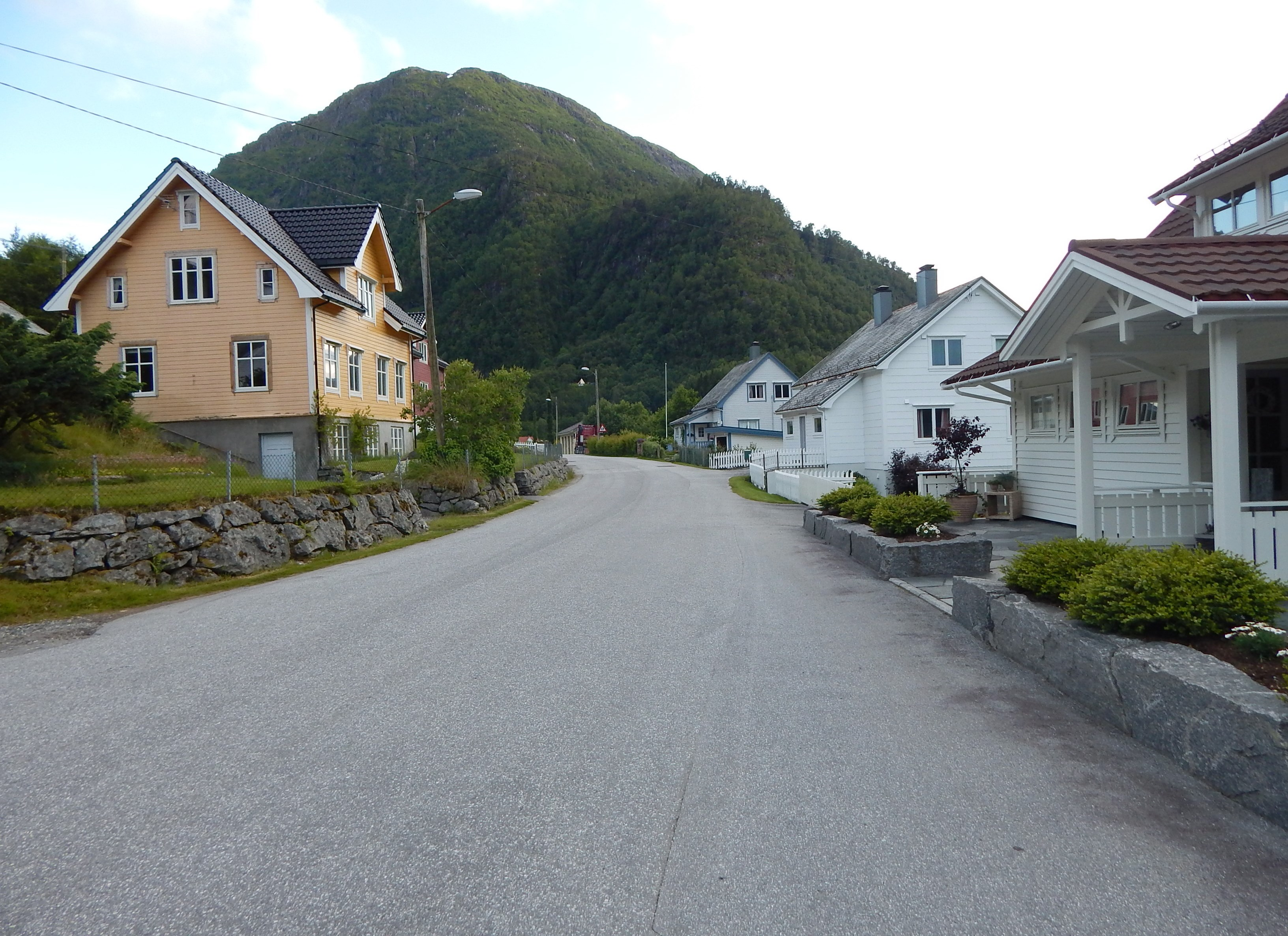
- Houses on street in Straume
- Interactive map of Hyen
- Location within Vestland Location within Norway
- Coordinates: 61.73568°N 5.9148°E
- Country: Norway
- Region: Western Norway
- County: Vestland
- District: Nordfjord
- Municipality: Gloppen Municipality
- Elevation: 3 m (9.8 ft)
- Time zone: UTC+01:00 (CET)
  - Summer (DST): UTC+02:00 (CEST)
- Post Code: 6829 Hyen

Hyen is a village in Gloppen Municipality in Vestland, Norway. The village lies near the southern end of the Hyefjorden near the mouths of the rivers Åelva and Hopelva. Hyen is located about 13 kilometres (8.1 mi) northeast of the lake Eimhjellevatnet, where the villages of Eimhjellen and Solheim are located. Hyen Church is located in the village, serving the whole western part of Gloppen Municipality.

There are around 600 people living in the Hyen area. The village lies along Norwegian County Road 615 which connects the whole Hyen valley to the municipal center of Sandane to the east and to the village of Eikefjord (in Kinn Municipality) to the west. Continuing on from Eikefjord, one can reach the towns of Førde and Florø which are both located along Norwegian National Road 5.

The nearby river Åelva is known for containing freshwater salmon.

== Economy ==
=== Brødrene Aa ===
The shipyard Brødrene Aa lies on the outskirts of the village of Hyen. Brødrene Aa develops and produces products in reinforced plastics like: protective guards, train fronts and express boats. The company is a world leader in the construction of fast ferries made of carbon fibre composites. The shipyard is located in Hyen, and employs 170 as of October 2024. The company became known for pioneering the use of composite materials for fast ferry applications, first with fibreglass composites in the 1970s and today with carbon fibre composites.
