= Solheim, Vestland =

Village in Gloppen Municipality, Norway

Solheim Vestre Hyen
- Village
- Interactive map of Solheim
- Location within Vestland Location within Norway
- Coordinates: 61.63185°N 5.71733°E
- Country: Norway
- Region: Western Norway
- County: Vestland
- District: Nordfjord
- Municipality: Gloppen Municipality
- Elevation: 167 m (548 ft)
- Time zone: UTC+01:00 (CET)
  - Summer (DST): UTC+02:00 (CEST)
- Post Code: 6829 Hyen

Solheim is a small village in Gloppen Municipality in Vestland county, Norway. The village lies on the western shore of the large lake Eimhjellevatnet, about 20 kilometres (12 mi) southwest of the village of Hyen. It takes about 40 minutes to drive from Solheim to the nearby towns of Førde (to the south) and Florø (to the west). The village of Eimhjellen lies about 5 kilometres (3.1 mi) almost straight east of Solheim, across the lake. There are numerous fish in the lake, especially trout.

Solheim is mostly an agricultural area and is home to many farmers. Compared to the surrounding villages, Solheim is a sunny place (not shaded by any large mountains), which gives the village its name Solheim, meaning "home of the sun". Solheim had a school until it was closed in 2009. The local students must travel to another school a little further away. The old school building is now used as a local community house for parties and gatherings.
