= Hyefjorden =

Fjord in Vestland, Norway

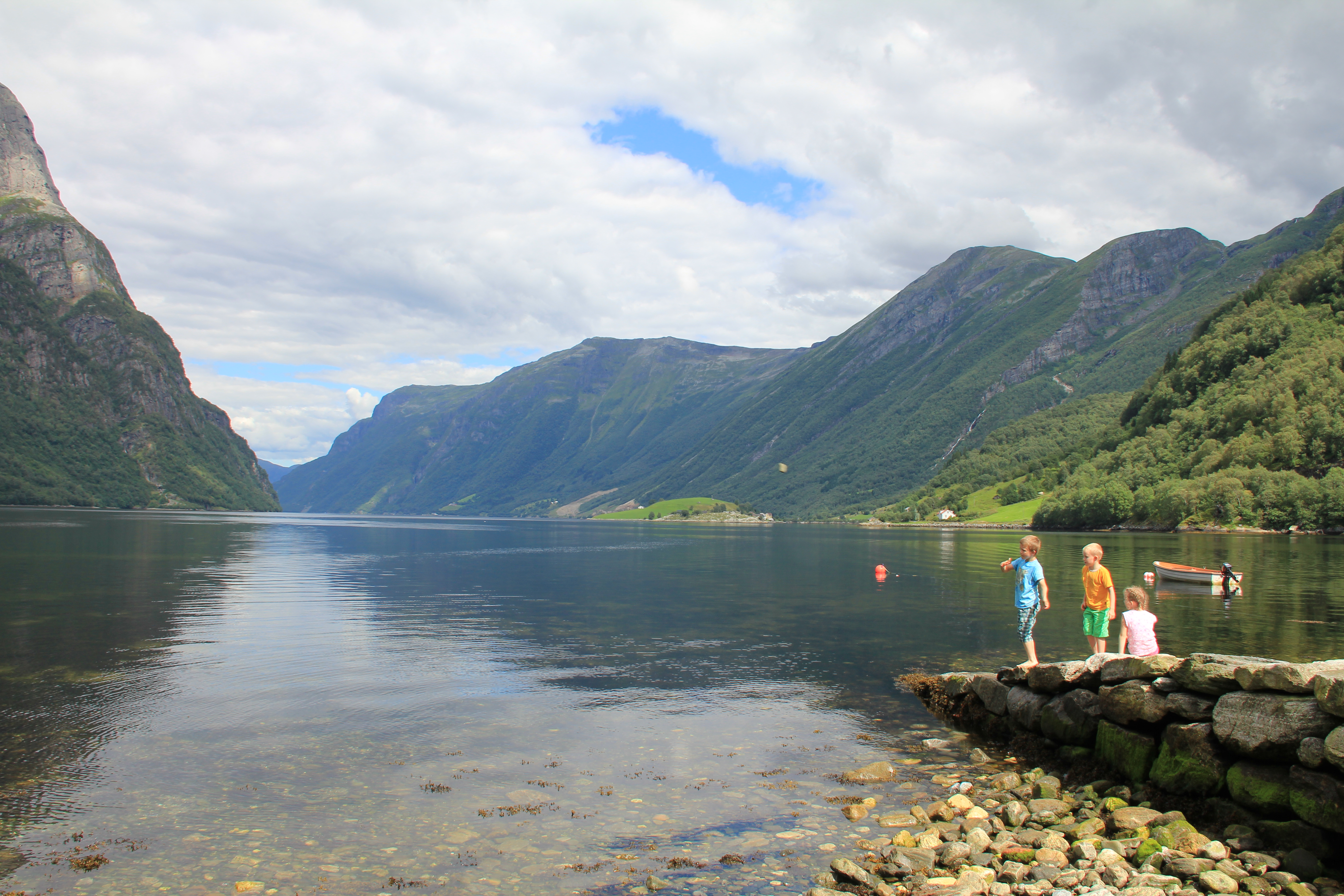
- View of the fjord
- Interactive map of the fjord
- Location: Vestland county, Norway
- Coordinates: 61.78006°N 5.9657°E
- Type: Fjord
- Primary outflows: Nordfjorden
- Basin countries: Norway
- Max. length: 14 kilometres (8.7 mi)
- Max. width: 1.3 kilometres (0.81 mi)
- Settlements: Hyen

Hyefjorden is a fjord in Gloppen Municipality in Vestland county, Norway. The 14-kilometre (8.7 mi) long Hyefjorden is relatively narrow with steep rock walls located close to the fjord on both sides. The west side is where impassable mountains plunge straight into the fjord. Norwegian County Road 615 runs on the east side of the bay, with a series of tunnels through avalanche areas. The Hyefjorden flows from the village of Hyen at the south to the north where it flows into the large Nordfjorden.

== See also ==
- List of Norwegian fjords
