= Eid Municipality (Sogn og Fjordane) =

Former municipality in Sogn og Fjordane, Norway

Eid Municipality Eid kommune
- Former municipality
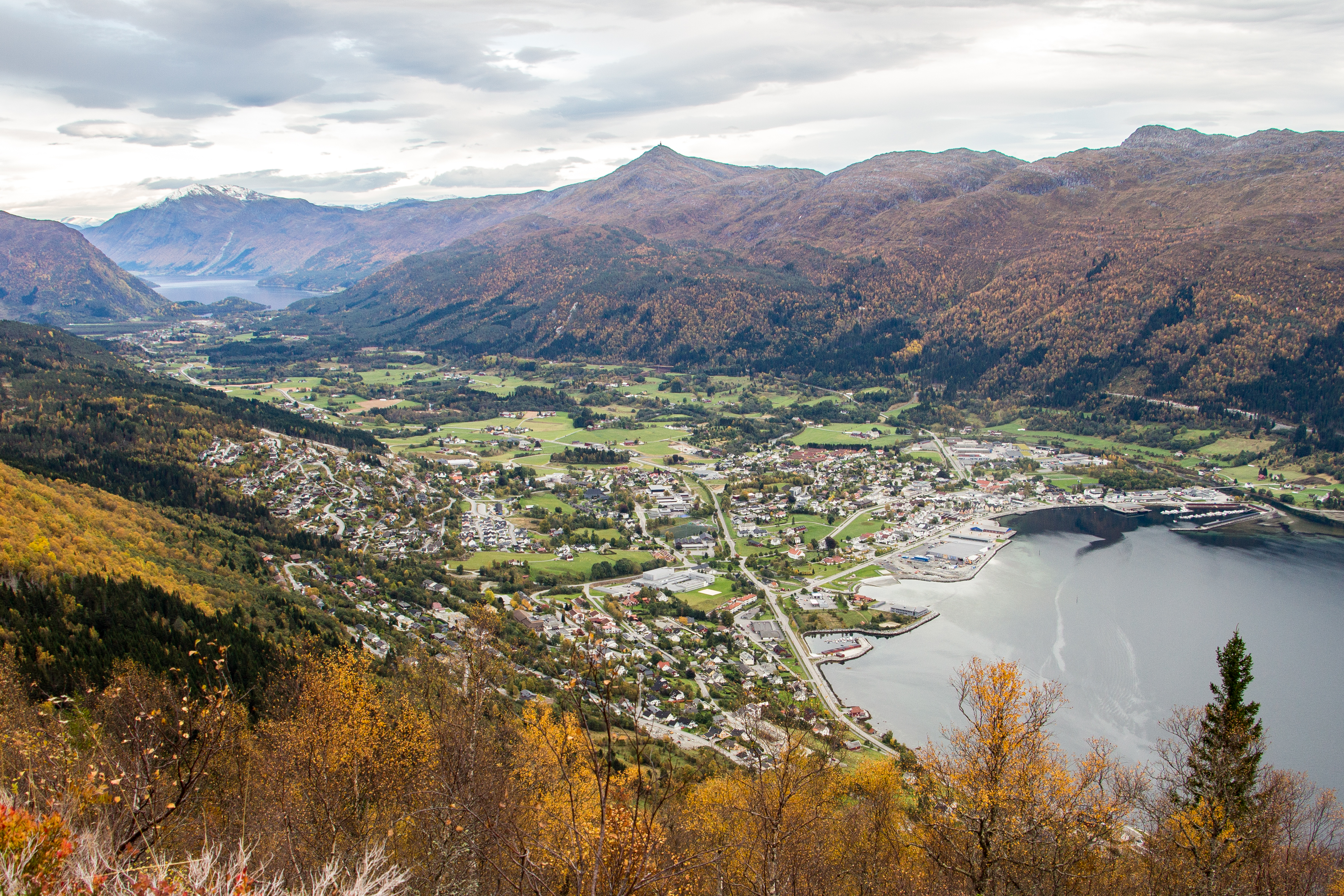
- View of the Nordfjordeid area

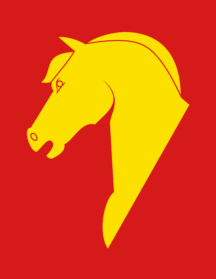
- Flag Coat of arms

- Sogn og Fjordane within Norway

- Eid within Sogn og Fjordane
- Coordinates: 61°54′41″N 06°02′14″E
- Country: Norway
- County: Sogn og Fjordane
- District: Nordfjord
- Established: 1 Jan 1838
  - Created as: Formannskapsdistrikt
- Disestablished: 1 Jan 2020
  - Succeeded by: Stad Municipality
- Administrative centre: Nordfjordeid

Government
  - Mayor (2011-2019): Alfred Bjørlo (V)

Area (upon dissolution)
  - Total: 469.24 km^{2} (181.17 sq mi)
  - Land: 420.22 km^{2} (162.25 sq mi)
  - Water: 49.02 km^{2} (18.93 sq mi) 10.4%
  - Rank: #215 in Norway
- Highest elevation: 1,297.4 m (4,257 ft)

Population (2019)
  - Total: 6,151
  - Rank: #168 in Norway
  - Density: 13.1/km^{2} (34/sq mi)
  - Change (10 years): ▲ +4.9%
- Demonym(s): Eidar; Eider

Official language
  - Norwegian form: Nynorsk
- Time zone: UTC+01:00 (CET)
  - Summer (DST): UTC+02:00 (CEST)
- ISO 3166 code: NO-1443

Eid is a former municipality in the old Sogn og Fjordane county, Norway. The 469-square-kilometre (181 sq mi) municipality existed from 1838 until its dissolution in 2020. The area is now part of Stad Municipality in the traditional district of Nordfjord. The administrative centre was the village of Nordfjordeid. Other villages in the municipality included Mogrenda, Stårheim, Haugen, Kjølsdalen, Heggjabygda, and Lote.

Prior to its dissolution in 2020, the 469-square-kilometre (181 sq mi) municipality is the 215th largest by area out of the 422 municipalities in Norway. Eid Municipality is the 168th most populous municipality in Norway with a population of 6,151. The municipality's population density is 13.1 inhabitants per square kilometre (34/sq mi) and its population has increased by 4.9% over the previous ten year period.

Eid was known for its opera, fjord horses, shopping, and hiking opportunities. As in the rest of the region, agriculture was very important here, but trade and industry were also important. Frislid Konfeksjon (textiles) and the Hellesøy Nordfjord shipyard among others are located in Eid.

Nordfjordeid's schools included the folk high school, which offers courses linked to Fjord horses and provides the only circus education in Norway. There is also the Norwegian Fjord Horse Centre (Norsk Fjordhestsenter) in Eid. Its focus was in boosting the breed's standing in Norway and elsewhere.

== General information ==
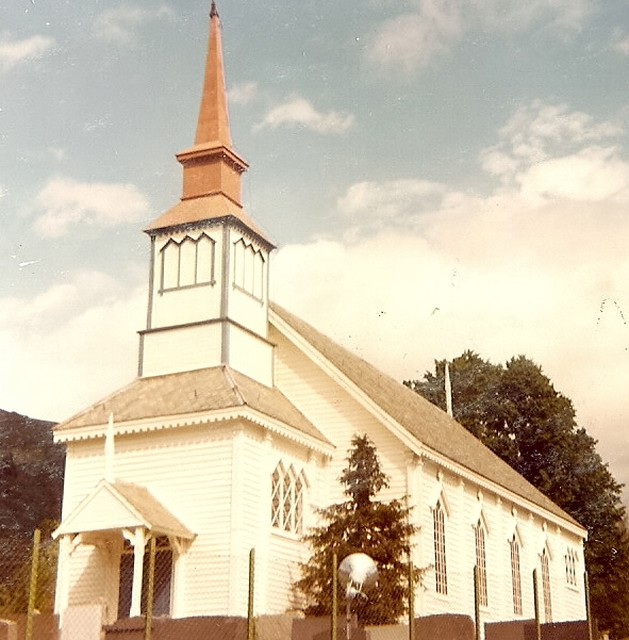
Stårheim Church

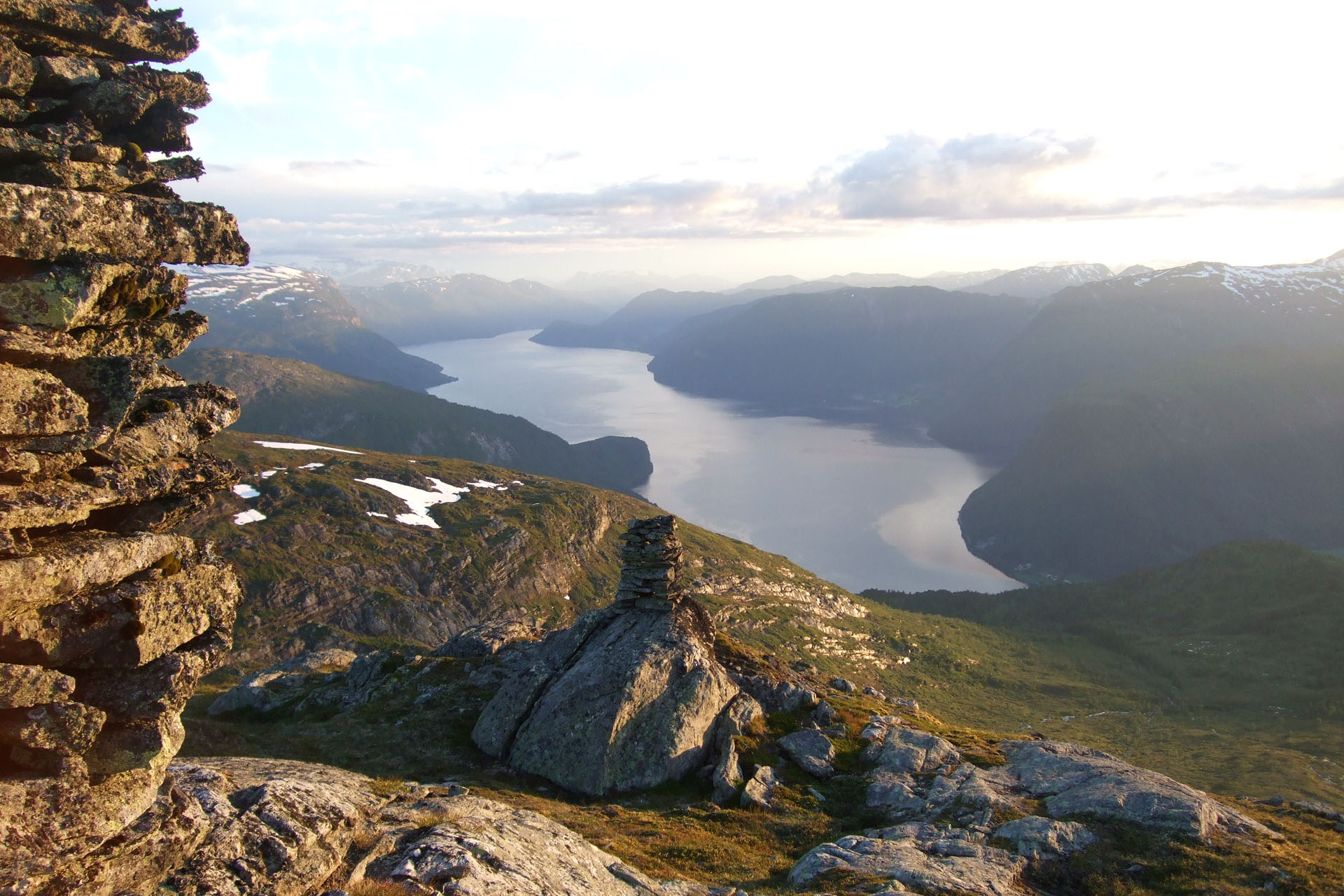
View of the fjord from Storehornet

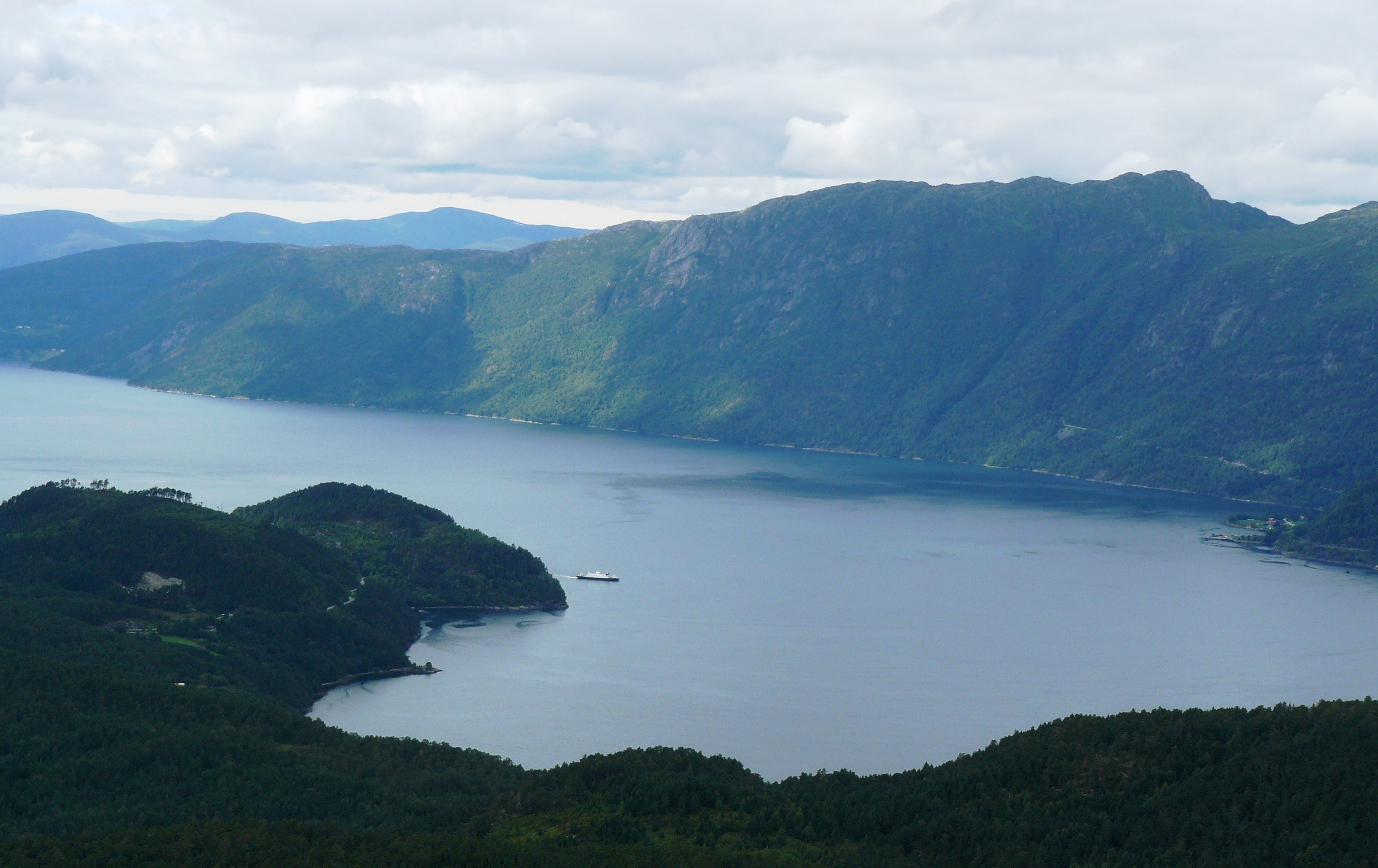
Nordfjord

The parish of Eid was established as a municipality on 1 January 1838 (see formannskapsdistrikt law). The original municipality was identical to the Eid parish (prestegjeld) with the sub-parishes (sokn) of Hornindal, Eid, and Stårheim. On 1 January 1867, the eastern district of Eid (population: 1,612) was separated to become the new Hornindal Municipality. This split left the two remaining sub-parishes of the municipality of Eid with a population of 2,918.

During the 1960s, there were many municipal mergers across Norway due to the work of the Schei Committee. On 1 January 1965, the neighboring Davik Municipality and Hornindal Municipality were dissolved and split up among the neighboring municipalities. The following areas were merged to form a new, larger Eid Municipality:

- all of Davik Municipality that was located north of the Nordfjorden and east of and including the village of Lefdal (population: 654)
- all of Hornindal Municipality located west of and including the villages of Navelsaker and Holmøyvik (population: 310)
- all of Eid Municipality (population: 3,568)

After the merger, Eid Municipality had 4,532 residents and the new municipality gained a third sub-parish from the former municipality of Davik: Kjølsdalen.

Then on 1 January 1992, the village of Lote and its surrounding area (population: 152) was transferred from Gloppen Municipality to Eid Municipality.

On 1 January 2020, Eid Municipality ceased to exist when it was merged with the neighboring Selje Municipality and the Bryggja-Totland area of Vågsøy Municipality to form the new Stad Municipality.

=== Name ===
The municipality (originally the parish) is named after the Eidsfjorden (Old Norse: Øygir) since it is a central geographical feature of the area. The fjord is a branch off the main Nordfjorden. The fjord name likely comes from an old river name (now called Eidselva). The name of the river was probably derived from the word aug or ǫfugr which both mean "turned the wrong way" or "backwards". This is likely because the river Eidselva meanders back and forth and from certain points it can seem to run backwards. Over the centuries, the name was corrupted so that it became more like the word Eid which is a Norwegian word that is derived from eið which means "isthmus".

=== Coat of arms ===
The coat of arms was granted on 26 April 1986 and they were in use until 1 January 2020 when the municipality ceased to exist. The official blazon is "Gules, a horse head couped Or" (Norwegian: På raud grunn eit gull hestehovud). This means the arms have a red field (background) and the charge is the head of a fjord horse (Fjording), cut cleanly at the neck. The charge has a tincture of Or which means it is commonly colored yellow, but if it is made out of metal, then gold is used. The region is well known for its own breed of horses, called the Fjording, that are very common and popular in the area. The Fjording is characterised by its white and black mane. The arms were designed by Inge Rotevatn. The municipal flag has the same design as the coat of arms.

=== Churches ===
The Church of Norway had three parishes (sokn) within Eid Municipality. It is part of the Nordfjord prosti (deanery) in the Diocese of Bjørgvin.

Churches in Eid Municipality
Parish (sokn)	Church name	Location of the church	Year built
Eid	Eid Church	Nordfjordeid	1849
Eid	Heggjabygda Church	Heggjabygda	1936
Kjølsdalen	Kjølsdalen Church	Kjølsdalen	1940
Stårheim	Stårheim Church	Stårheim	1864

== Government ==
While it existed, Eid Municipality was responsible for primary education (through 10th grade), outpatient health services, senior citizen services, welfare and other social services, zoning, economic development, and municipal roads and utilities. The municipality was governed by a municipal council of directly elected representatives. The mayor was indirectly elected by a vote of the municipal council. The municipality was under the jurisdiction of the Sogn og Fjordane District Court and the Gulating Court of Appeal.

=== Municipal council ===
The municipal council (Herredsstyre) of Eid Municipality was made up of 29 representatives that were elected to four year terms. The tables below show the historical composition of the council by political party.

Eid kommunestyre 2015–2019
Party name (in Nynorsk)	Number of representatives
Labour Party (Arbeidarpartiet)	4
Progress Party (Framstegspartiet)	1
Conservative Party (Høgre)	4
Christian Democratic Party (Kristeleg Folkeparti)	1
Centre Party (Senterpartiet)	9
Socialist Left Party (Sosialistisk Venstreparti)	1
Liberal Party (Venstre)	9
Total number of members:	29
Note: On 1 January 2020, Eid Municipality became part of Stad Municipality.

Eid kommunestyre 2011–2015
Party name (in Nynorsk)	Number of representatives
Labour Party (Arbeidarpartiet)	2
Progress Party (Framstegspartiet)	2
Conservative Party (Høgre)	4
Christian Democratic Party (Kristeleg Folkeparti)	1
Centre Party (Senterpartiet)	6
Socialist Left Party (Sosialistisk Venstreparti)	1
Liberal Party (Venstre)	13
Total number of members:	29

Eid kommunestyre 2007–2011
Party name (in Nynorsk)	Number of representatives
Labour Party (Arbeidarpartiet)	8
Progress Party (Framstegspartiet)	2
Conservative Party (Høgre)	6
Christian Democratic Party (Kristeleg Folkeparti)	2
Centre Party (Senterpartiet)	7
Socialist Left Party (Sosialistisk Venstreparti)	1
Liberal Party (Venstre)	3
Total number of members:	29

Eid kommunestyre 2003–2007
Party name (in Nynorsk)	Number of representatives
Labour Party (Arbeidarpartiet)	5
Progress Party (Framstegspartiet)	2
Conservative Party (Høgre)	4
Christian Democratic Party (Kristeleg Folkeparti)	2
Centre Party (Senterpartiet)	8
Socialist Left Party (Sosialistisk Venstreparti)	2
Liberal Party (Venstre)	6
Total number of members:	29

Eid kommunestyre 1999–2003
Party name (in Nynorsk)	Number of representatives
Labour Party (Arbeidarpartiet)	4
Progress Party (Framstegspartiet)	2
Conservative Party (Høgre)	10
Christian Democratic Party (Kristeleg Folkeparti)	2
Centre Party (Senterpartiet)	9
Socialist Left Party (Sosialistisk Venstreparti)	2
Liberal Party (Venstre)	4
Total number of members:	33

Eid kommunestyre 1995–1999
Party name (in Nynorsk)	Number of representatives
Labour Party (Arbeidarpartiet)	4
Progress Party (Framstegspartiet)	1
Conservative Party (Høgre)	9
Christian Democratic Party (Kristeleg Folkeparti)	2
Centre Party (Senterpartiet)	11
Socialist Left Party (Sosialistisk Venstreparti)	1
Liberal Party (Venstre)	5
Total number of members:	33

Eid kommunestyre 1991–1995
Party name (in Nynorsk)	Number of representatives
Labour Party (Arbeidarpartiet)	5
Progress Party (Framstegspartiet)	1
Conservative Party (Høgre)	7
Christian Democratic Party (Kristeleg Folkeparti)	2
Centre Party (Senterpartiet)	11
Socialist Left Party (Sosialistisk Venstreparti)	2
Liberal Party (Venstre)	5
Total number of members:	33

Eid kommunestyre 1987–1991
Party name (in Nynorsk)	Number of representatives
Labour Party (Arbeidarpartiet)	8
Conservative Party (Høgre)	8
Christian Democratic Party (Kristeleg Folkeparti)	3
Centre Party (Senterpartiet)	9
Socialist Left Party (Sosialistisk Venstreparti)	1
Liberal Party (Venstre)	4
Total number of members:	33

Eid kommunestyre 1983–1987
Party name (in Nynorsk)	Number of representatives
Labour Party (Arbeidarpartiet)	8
Conservative Party (Høgre)	8
Christian Democratic Party (Kristeleg Folkeparti)	4
Centre Party (Senterpartiet)	9
Liberal Party (Venstre)	4
Total number of members:	33

Eid kommunestyre 1979–1983
Party name (in Nynorsk)	Number of representatives
Labour Party (Arbeidarpartiet)	6
Conservative Party (Høgre)	8
Christian Democratic Party (Kristeleg Folkeparti)	4
Centre Party (Senterpartiet)	10
Liberal Party (Venstre)	4
Non-party list (Upolitisk liste)	1
Total number of members:	33

Eid kommunestyre 1975–1979
Party name (in Nynorsk)	Number of representatives
Labour Party (Arbeidarpartiet)	3
Conservative Party (Høgre)	5
Christian Democratic Party (Kristeleg Folkeparti)	4
Centre Party (Senterpartiet)	14
Liberal Party (Venstre)	2
Non-party list (Upolitisk Liste)	1
Total number of members:	29

Eid kommunestyre 1971–1975
Party name (in Nynorsk)	Number of representatives
Labour Party (Arbeidarpartiet)	4
Conservative Party (Høgre)	2
Christian Democratic Party (Kristeleg Folkeparti)	3
Centre Party (Senterpartiet)	13
Liberal Party (Venstre)	7
Total number of members:	29

Eid kommunestyre 1967–1971
Party name (in Nynorsk)	Number of representatives
Labour Party (Arbeidarpartiet)	7
Conservative Party (Høgre)	3
Christian Democratic Party (Kristeleg Folkeparti)	3
Centre Party (Senterpartiet)	10
Liberal Party (Venstre)	6
Total number of members:	29

Eid kommunestyre 1963–1967
Party name (in Nynorsk)	Number of representatives
Labour Party (Arbeidarpartiet)	7
Conservative Party (Høgre)	3
Christian Democratic Party (Kristeleg Folkeparti)	3
Centre Party (Senterpartiet)	10
Liberal Party (Venstre)	6
Total number of members:	29

Eid heradsstyre 1959–1963
Party name (in Nynorsk)	Number of representatives
Labour Party (Arbeidarpartiet)	6
Conservative Party (Høgre)	2
Christian Democratic Party (Kristeleg Folkeparti)	3
Centre Party (Senterpartiet)	7
Liberal Party (Venstre)	6
Local List(s) (Lokale lister)	5
Total number of members:	29

Eid heradsstyre 1955–1959
Party name (in Nynorsk)	Number of representatives
Labour Party (Arbeidarpartiet)	6
Conservative Party (Høgre)	2
Christian Democratic Party (Kristeleg Folkeparti)	2
Joint List(s) of Non-Socialist Parties (Borgarlege Felleslister)	7
Local List(s) (Lokale lister)	12
Total number of members:	29

Eid heradsstyre 1951–1955
Party name (in Nynorsk)	Number of representatives
Labour Party (Arbeidarpartiet)	6
Liberal Party (Venstre)	7
Joint List(s) of Non-Socialist Parties (Borgarlege Felleslister)	4
Local List(s) (Lokale lister)	11
Total number of members:	28

Eid heradsstyre 1947–1951
Party name (in Nynorsk)	Number of representatives
Labour Party (Arbeidarpartiet)	4
Joint List(s) of Non-Socialist Parties (Borgarlege Felleslister)	9
Local List(s) (Lokale lister)	15
Total number of members:	28

Eid heradsstyre 1945–1947
Party name (in Nynorsk)	Number of representatives
Labour Party (Arbeidarpartiet)	7
Local List(s) (Lokale lister)	21
Total number of members:	28

Eid heradsstyre 1937–1941*
Party name (in Nynorsk)	Number of representatives
Labour Party (Arbeidarpartiet)	4
Farmers' Party (Bondepartiet)	3
Liberal Party (Venstre)	5
Local List(s) (Lokale lister)	8
Total number of members:	28
Note: Due to the German occupation of Norway during World War II, no elections were held for new municipal councils until after the war ended in 1945.

=== Mayors ===
The mayor (Norwegian: ordfører) of Eid Municipality was the political leader of the municipality and the chairperson of the municipal council. The following people have held this position:

- 1838–1841: Rev. Johan Herman Lie
- 1842–1843: Tollef Rød
- 1844–1851: Rev. Johan Herman Lie
- 1852–1857: Jens J. Finckenhagen
- 1858–1864: Eirik Løken
- 1865–1867: Anders Ous
- 1868–1869: Hans Sandboe Schølberg
- 1870–1871: Eirik Løken
- 1871–1879: Sølfest Kvale
- 1880–1882: Kristian Blom
- 1883–1897: Rasmus Møklebust (V)
- 1898–1916: John Myklebust (V)
- 1917–1934: Anders Hjelle (V)
- 1935–1935: John Myklebust (V)
- 1935–1940: Olav Os (Bp)
- 1941–1943: Arnt Hjelle (NS)
- 1943–1945: Peder Sporsem (NS)
- 1947–1947: Olav Os (Bp)
- 1948–1963: Berge Smørdal (Bp)
- 1963–1971: Per Roti (Sp)
- 1972–1983: Lars Myrold (Sp)
- 1984–1991: Knut Hildenes (Sp)
- 1992–1993: Kjell Nøstdal (V)
- 1994–2003: Kristen Hundeide (H)
- 2003–2005: Gunvald Ludvigsen (V)
- 2005–2011: Sonja Edvardsen (Ap)
- 2011–2019: Alfred Bjørlo (V)

== Geography ==
Eid Municipality was located in the northernmost part of Sogn og Fjordane county. It was located along the northern shores of the Nordfjorden and it surrounded the Eidsfjorden branch off of the main Nordfjorden. Eid Municipality was bordered to the west by Vågsøy Municipality, to the south by Bremanger Municipality and Gloppen Municipality, to the east by Stryn Municipality and Hornindal Municipality, and to the north by Volda Municipality and Vanylven Municipality (both in Møre og Romsdal county).

The lake Hornindalsvatnet, the deepest lake in Europe, was partially located in Eid Municipality. The highest point in the municipality was the 1,297.4-metre (4,257 ft) tall mountain Glitregga, located on the southeastern border with Stryn Municipality.

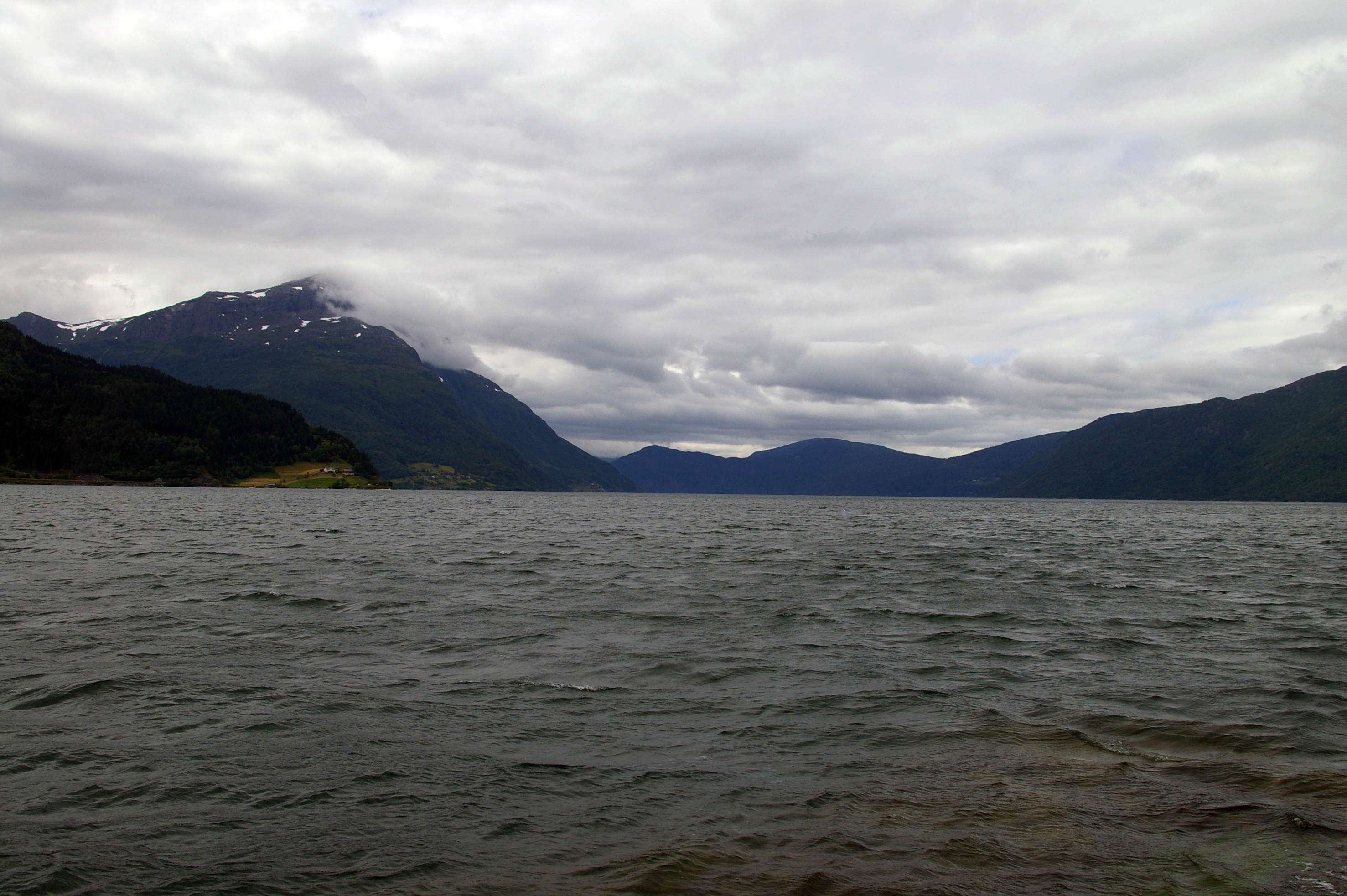
Hundvikfjord seen from Anda

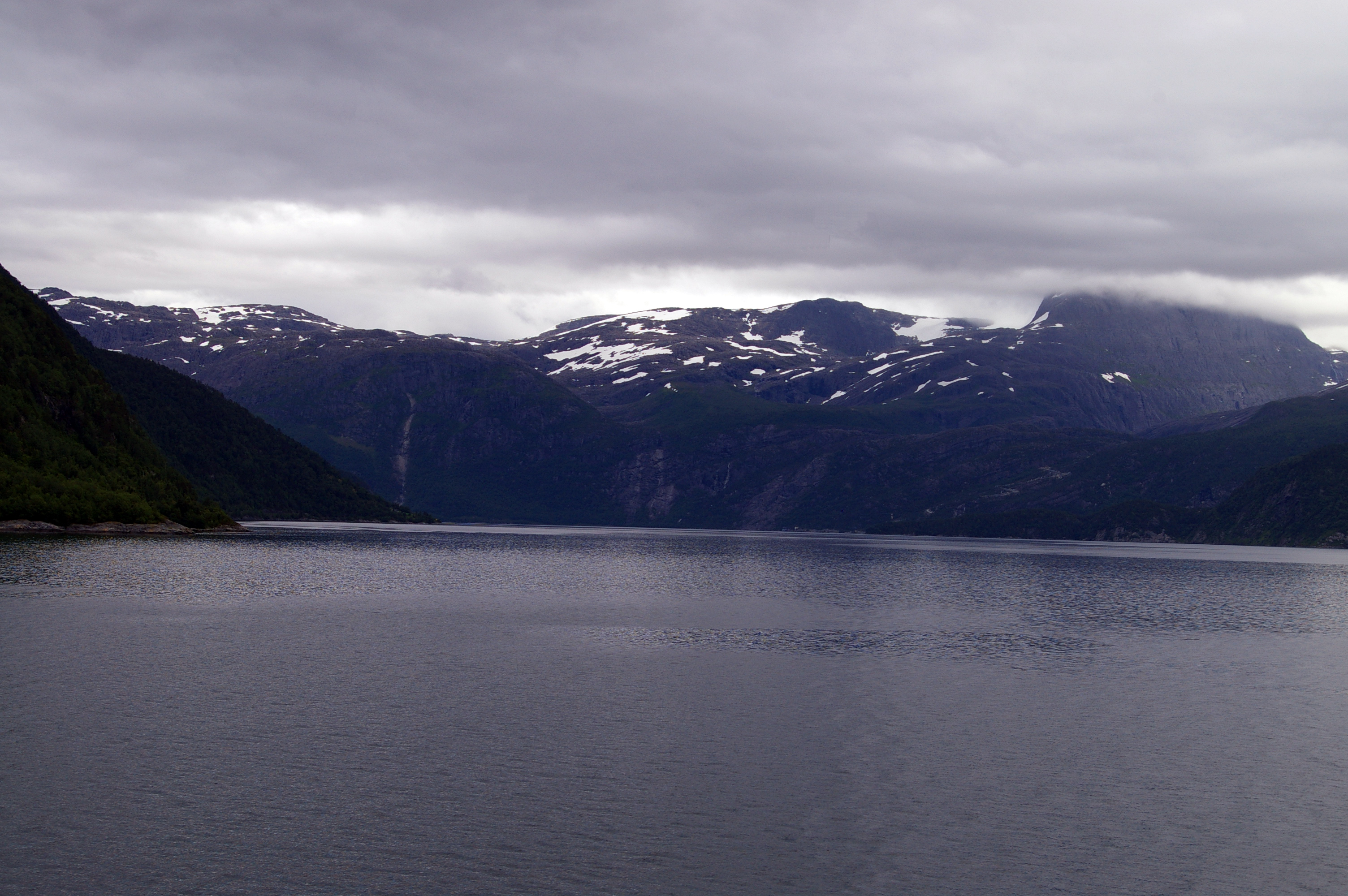
Isefjorden, between Eid Municipality and Bremanger Municipality

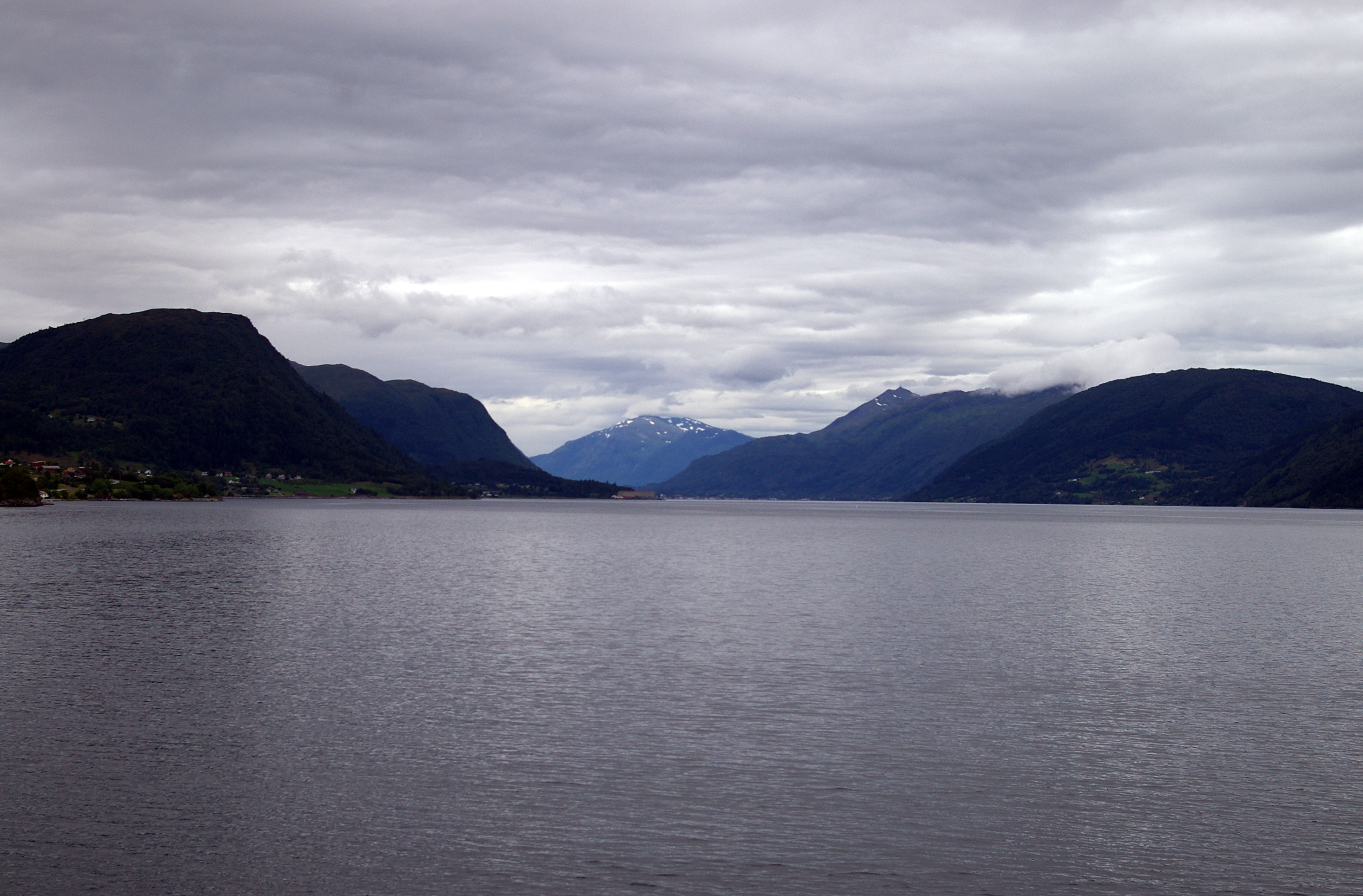
View of the Eidsfjorden

== Notable people ==
- Sophus Lie (1842–1899), a mathematician
- Azar Karadaş, a football player
- Harald Aabrekk, a soccer coach

== See also ==
- List of former municipalities of Norway
