= Davik =

Davik may refer to:

== Places ==
- Davik Municipality, a former municipality in the old Sogn og Fjordane county, Norway
- Davik (village), a village in Bremanger Municipality in Vestland county, Norway
- Davik Church, a church in Bremanger Municipality in Vestland county, Norway

== People ==
- Ingebrigt Davik (1925—1991), a Norwegian teacher, children's writer, broadcasting personality, singer and songwriter
- Davik Kang, a fictional character in the Star Wars: Knights of the Old Republic series
