= Davik Municipality =

Former municipality in Sogn og Fjordane, Norway

Davik Municipality Davik herad
- Former municipality
- Daviken herred (historic name)
- Sogn og Fjordane within Norway

- Davik within Sogn og Fjordane
- Coordinates: 61°53′29″N 05°31′50″E
- Country: Norway
- County: Sogn og Fjordane
- District: Nordfjord
- Established: 1 Jan 1838
  - Created as: Formannskapsdistrikt
- Disestablished: 1 Jan 1965
  - Succeeded by: Bremanger and Eid
- Administrative centre: Davik

Government
  - Mayor (1960–1965): Alf Bakke

Area (upon dissolution)
  - Total: 647.5 km^{2} (250.0 sq mi)
  - Rank: #152 in Norway
- Highest elevation: 1,670.26 m (5,479.9 ft)

Population (1963)
  - Total: 3,509
  - Rank: #256 in Norway
  - Density: 5.4/km^{2} (14/sq mi)
  - Change (10 years): ▼ −4.6%

Official language
  - Norwegian form: Nynorsk
- Time zone: UTC+01:00 (CET)
  - Summer (DST): UTC+02:00 (CEST)
- ISO 3166 code: NO-1442

Davik is a former municipality in the old Sogn og Fjordane county, Norway. The 648-square-kilometre (250 sq mi) municipality existed from 1838 until its dissolution in 1964. The area is divided between Bremanger Municipality, Kinn Municipality, and Stad Municipality in the traditional district of Nordfjord in Vestland county. The administrative centre was the village of Davik on the southern shore of the Nordfjorden, although some of the municipal services were based out of the village of Bryggja on the north side of the fjord, since that village was the largest village in Davik Municipality.

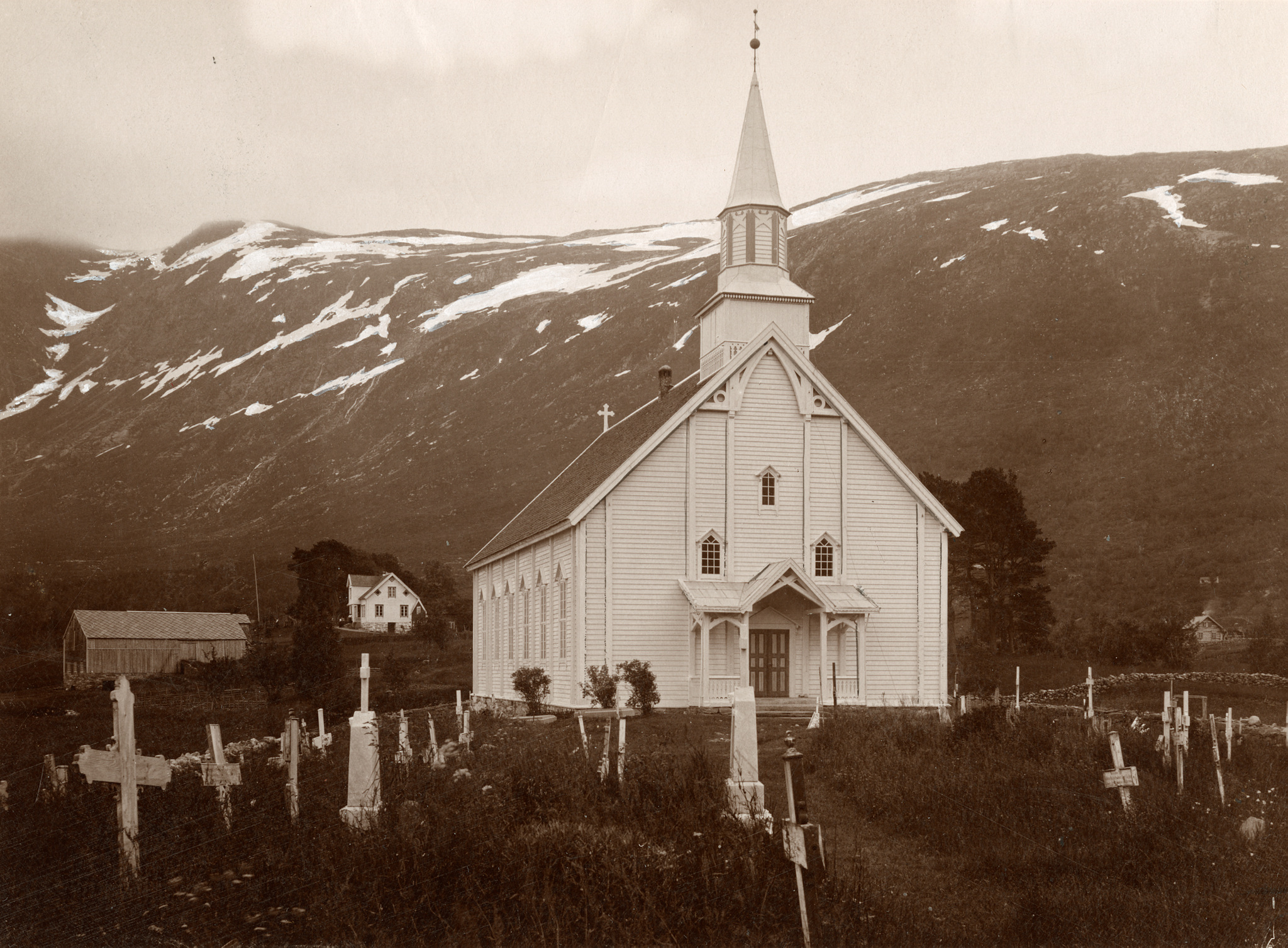
Davik Church

Prior to its dissolution in 1964, the 647.5-square-kilometre (250.0 sq mi) municipality was the 152nd largest by area out of the 689 municipalities in Norway. Davik Municipality was the 256th most populous municipality in Norway with a population of about 3,509. The municipality's population density was 5.4 inhabitants per square kilometre (14/sq mi) and its population had decreased by 4.6% over the previous 10-year period.

Davik Church was the main church for the municipality, and it was located in the village of Davik, in the central part of the municipality. Rugsund Church (in the village of Rugsund) served the western part of the municipality and Ålfoten Church (in the village of Ålfoten) served the eastern part of the municipality.

== General information ==
The parish of Davik was established as a municipality on 1 January 1838 (see formannskapsdistrikt law). On 1 January 1913, the Mettenes farm (population: 3, located on the south shore of the Nordfjorden in extreme eastern Davik) was transferred to the neighboring Gloppen Municipality.

During the 1960s, there were many municipal mergers across Norway due to the work of the Schei Committee. On 1 January 1964, the islands of Husevågøy, Grindøya, Gangsøya, Risøya, and all of Davik Municipality that was north of the Nordfjorden and east of the village of Lefdal became part of the newly-created Vågsøy Municipality. The population of this area was 1,216 at that time.

On 1 January 1965, Davik Municipality ceased to exist and its territory was divided between its neighboring municipalities as follows:

- All of Davik located south of the Nordfjorden and all the islands that did not go to Vågsøy Municipality in 1964 went to Bremanger Municipality. The population of this area was 1,567 at the time of the merger.
- All of Davik located north of the Nordfjorden and east of the village of Lefdal (including Lefdal) went to Eid Municipality. The population of this area was 654 at the time of the merger.

=== Name ===
The municipality (originally the parish) is named after the old Davik farm (Old Norse: Dafvíkr) since the first Davik Church was built there. The first element is dafi which means "spear". The last element is víkr which means "inlet" or "cove". Thus, the name appears to be referring to the long, skinny spear-like shape of the local fjord. Historically, the name of the municipality was spelled Davigen or Daviken. On 3 November 1917, a royal resolution changed the spelling of the name of the municipality to Davik, removing the definite form ending -en.

=== Churches ===
The Church of Norway had three parishes (sokn) within Davik Municipality. At the time of the municipal dissolution, it was part of the Davik prestegjeld and the Nordfjord prosti (deanery) in the Diocese of Bjørgvin.

Churches in Davik Municipality
Parish (sokn)	Church name	Location of the church	Year built
Davik	Davik Church	Davik	1886
Davik	Kjølsdalen Chapel	Kjølsdalen	1940
Rugsund	Rugsund Church	Rugsund	1838
Rugsund	Totland Chapel	Totland	1912
Ålfoten	Ålfoten Church	Ålfoten	1678

== Geography ==
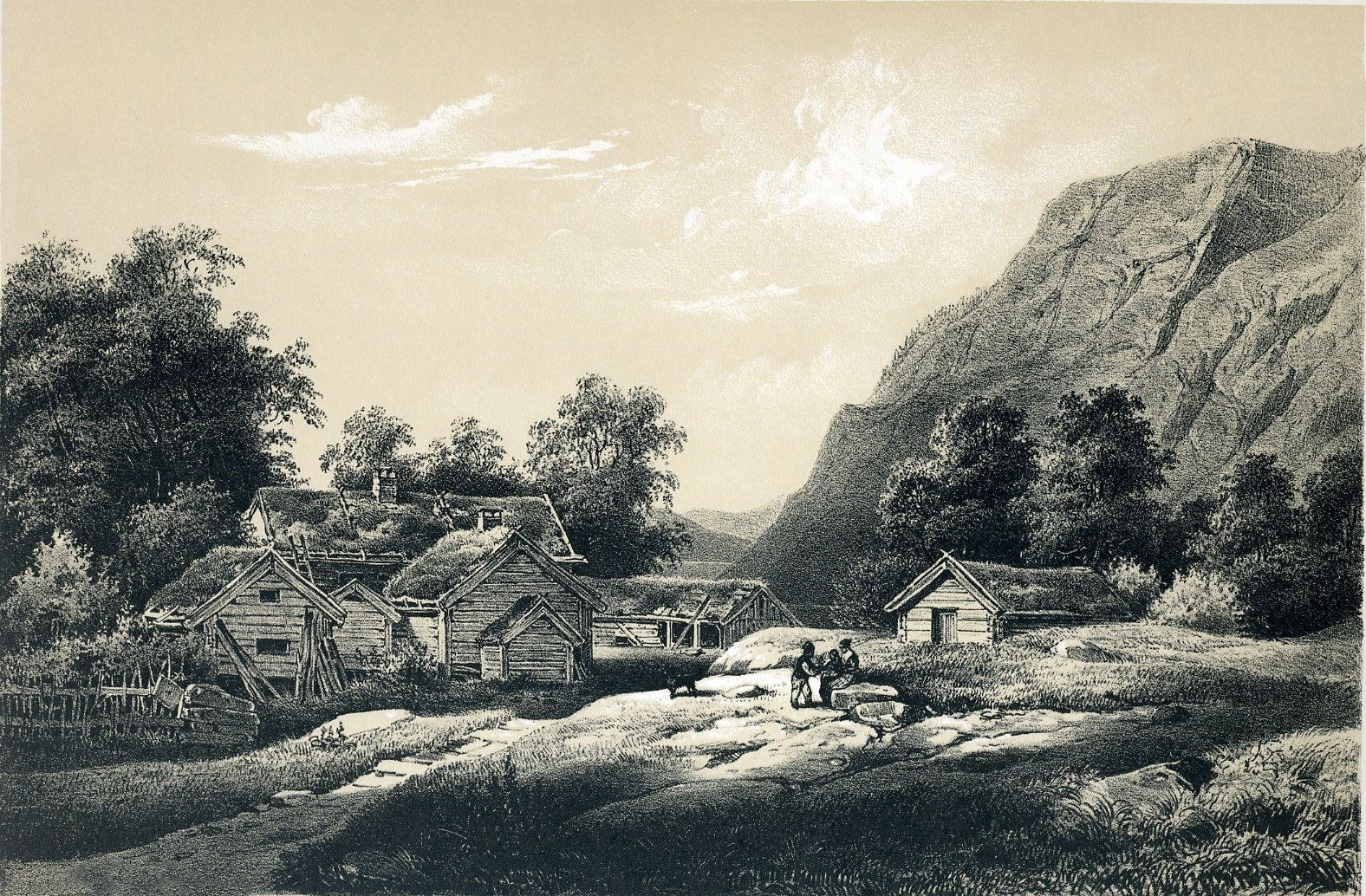
Painting of Davik c. 1848 Credit: Jacob Calmeyer

It encompassed all the lands surrounding the outer part of the large Nordfjorden on both sides of the fjord. It included high mountains, fjords, and the Ålfotbreen glacier. The highest point in the municipality was the 1,670.26-metre (5,479.9 ft) tall mountain Blånibba.

Vanylven Municipality (in Møre og Romsdal county) was to the north, Eid Municipality was to the northwest, Gloppen Municipality was to the east, Bru Municipality was to the south, Bremanger Municipality was to the southwest, and Sør-Vågsøy Municipality was to the northwest.

== Government ==
While it existed, Davik Municipality was responsible for primary education (through 10th grade), outpatient health services, senior citizen services, welfare and other social services, zoning, economic development, and municipal roads and utilities. The municipality was governed by a municipal council of directly elected representatives. The mayor was indirectly elected by a vote of the municipal council. The municipality was under the jurisdiction of the Gulating Court of Appeal.

=== Municipal council ===
The municipal council (Heradsstyre) of Davik Municipality was made up of 21 representatives that were elected to four year terms. The tables below show the historical composition of the council by political party.

Davik kommunestyre 1963–1964
Party name (in Nynorsk)	Number of representatives
Conservative Party (Høgre)	4
Christian Democratic Party (Kristeleg Folkeparti)	2
Local List(s) (Lokale lister)	15
Total number of members:	21

Davik heradsstyre 1959–1963
Party name (in Nynorsk)	Number of representatives
Conservative Party (Høgre)	5
Local List(s) (Lokale lister)	24
Total number of members:	29

Davik heradsstyre 1955–1959
Party name (in Nynorsk)	Number of representatives
Conservative Party (Høgre)	2
Local List(s) (Lokale lister)	27
Total number of members:	29

Davik heradsstyre 1951–1955
Party name (in Nynorsk)	Number of representatives
Local List(s) (Lokale lister)	32
Total number of members:	32

Davik heradsstyre 1947–1951
Party name (in Nynorsk)	Number of representatives
Local List(s) (Lokale lister)	32
Total number of members:	32

Davik heradsstyre 1945–1947
Party name (in Nynorsk)	Number of representatives
List of workers, fishermen, and small farmholders (Arbeidarar, fiskarar, småbrukarar liste)	1
Local List(s) (Lokale lister)	31
Total number of members:	32

Davik heradsstyre 1937–1941*
Party name (in Nynorsk)	Number of representatives
Labour Party (Arbeidarpartiet)	2
Local List(s) (Lokale lister)	30
Total number of members:	32
Note: Due to the German occupation of Norway during World War II, no elections were held for new municipal councils until after the war ended in 1945.

=== Mayors ===
The mayor (Nynorsk: ordførar) of Davik Municipality was the political leader of the municipality and the chairperson of the municipal council. The following people have held this position:

- 1838–1839: Henrik Didrik Echoff Friis
- 1840–1843: G.J. Lund
- 1844–1847: Peter Martin Knoph
- 1848–1849: Ole Martin Wiig
- 1850–1859: Rev. Christian Meyer
- 1860–1861: Lauritz Elstrand
- 1862–1867: Rev. Christian Meyer
- 1868–1871: John Rasmusson Muri
- 1872–1877: Ola Abrahamson Hougs
- 1878–1879: Peder J. Hessevik
- 1880–1885: Hans Kristian Jensen Lefdal
- 1886–1891: Botolv Helgeson Thue
- 1892–1895: Waldemar Bakke
- 1896–1897: Lars J. Eldevik
- 1898–1898: Daniel Follestad
- 1899–1916: Apollonius Liljedal Ronsenlund
- 1916–1937: Lars P. Lefdal
- 1938–1941: Reinert Førde
- 1945–1949: Reinert Førde
- 1950–1952: Alfred Haugland
- 1953–1959: Olav Dybedal
- 1960–1964: Alf Bakke

== See also ==
- List of former municipalities of Norway
