= Kjølsdalen Church =

Church in Vestland, Norway

- Kjølsdalen kyrkje
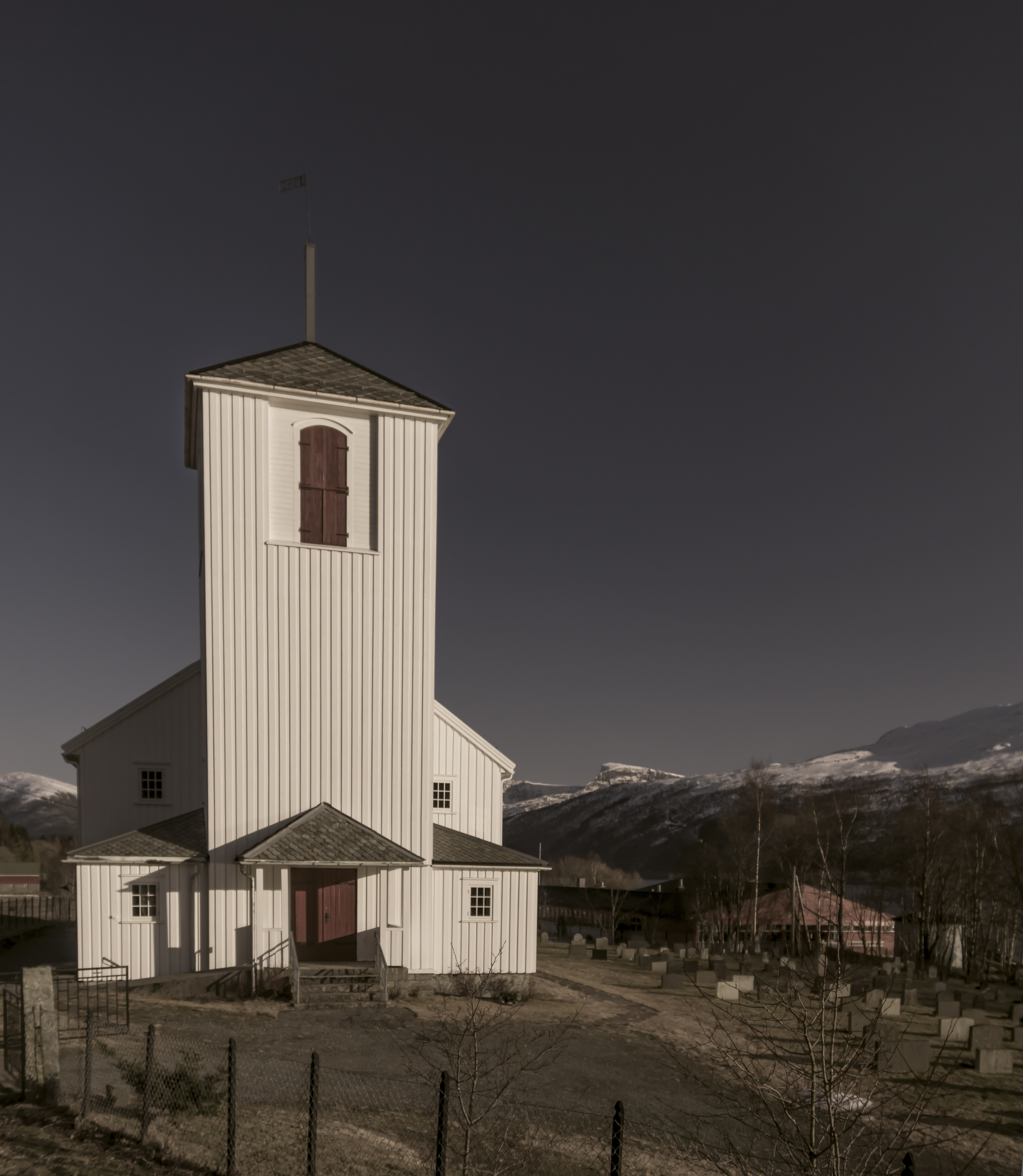
- View of the church
- Kjølsdalen Church
- 61°55′05″N 5°37′30″E
- Location: Stad Municipality, Vestland
- Country: Norway
- Denomination: Church of Norway
- Churchmanship: Evangelical Lutheran

History
- Status: Parish church
- Founded: 1940
- Consecrated: 13 Sept 1940

Architecture
- Functional status: Active
- Architect: H.F. Crawfurd-Jensen
- Architectural type: Long church
- Completed: 1940 (86 years ago)

Specifications
- Capacity: 300
- Materials: Wood

Administration
- Diocese: Bjørgvin bispedømme
- Deanery: Nordfjord prosti
- Parish: Kjølsdalen
- Norwegian Cultural Heritage Site
- Type: Church
- Status: Not protected
- ID: 84789

Kjølsdalen Church (Norwegian: Kjølsdalen kyrkje) is a parish church of the Church of Norway in Stad Municipality in Vestland county, Norway. It is located in the village of Kjølsdalen. It is the church for the Kjølsdalen parish which is part of the Nordfjord prosti (deanery) in the Diocese of Bjørgvin. The white, wooden church was built in a long church design in 1940 using plans drawn up by the architect Hans Fredrik Crawfurd-Jensen. The church seats about 300 people.

== History ==
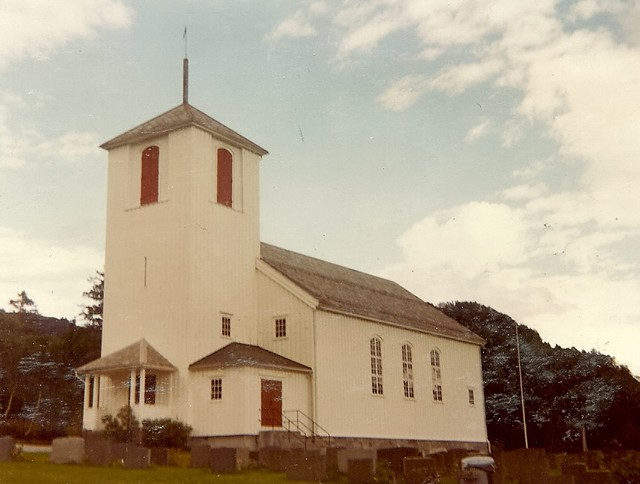
View of the church

Historically, the Kjølsdalen area was part of the Davik Church parish in Davik Municipality. During the 1870s, there was some bitter local strife about the location of the church in Davik. The people on the north side of the Nordfjorden wanted the church moved across the fjord to Haus (near Kjølsdalen) and the people on the south side wanted it to stay in the village of Davik where it had been for centuries. The parish council eventually agreed to move the church site, but this never came to fruition. In 1928, an auxiliary cemetery for the parish was built at Kjølsdalen since the graveyard at Davik Church was too small. Not long after this, the residents again began to push for a chapel at the cemetery. In 1935, the parish agreed to build a chapel by the Kjølsdalen cemetery. The parish chose to use architectural drawings made by Hans Fredrik Crawfurd-Jensen and they also hired the company Tennøe & Skaar as the building contractors. Construction of the church happened during World War II and the building was consecrated on 13 September 1940–one of the very few churches built in Norway during the war.

In 1954, the chapel was upgraded to the status of parish church. In 1965, Davik Municipality and its parish was dissolved and the Kjølsdalen area joined the neighboring Eid Municipality. In 1978–1979, bathrooms were added to the church using designs by Mathias Nes from the architectural firm Vaardal-Lunde. The 1992 New Year's Day Storm caused extensive damage to the church. Afterwards, the church was renovated and steel girders were installed to strengthen the church's structure and prevent future storms from causing such damage. In 2009, damage from rot was discovered in the church and in 2011, the church was renovated again to remove and replace the rotting structure.

== See also ==
- List of churches in Bjørgvin
