= Oldevatnet =

Lake in Vestland, Norway

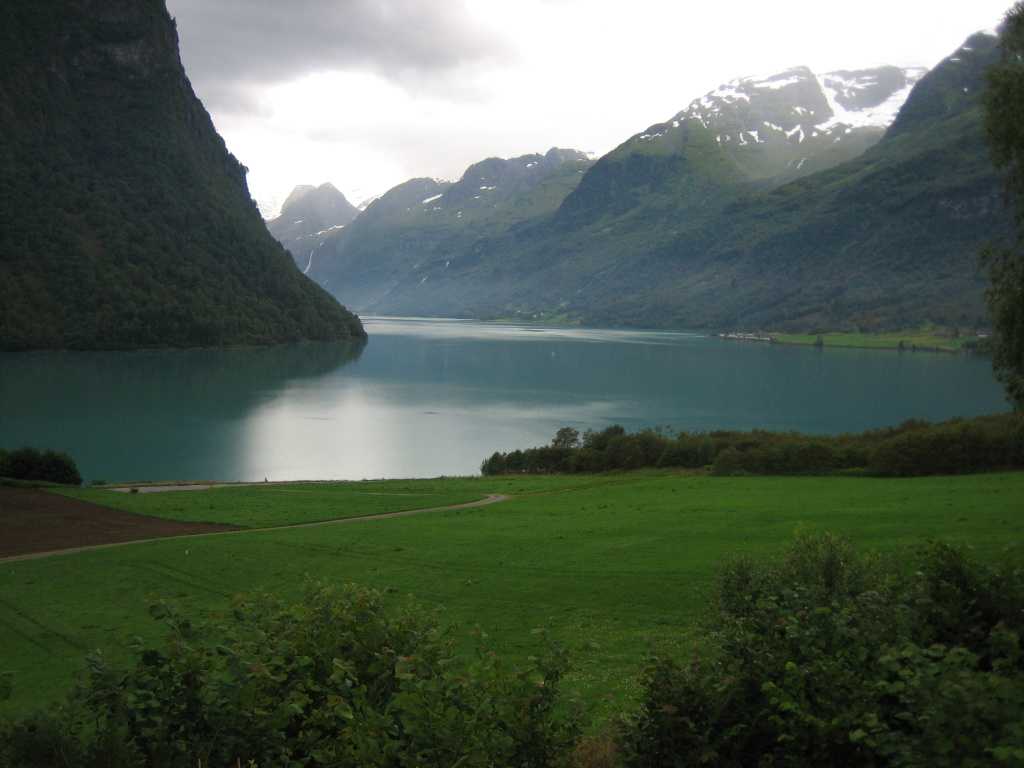
- Interactive map of the lake
- Location: Stryn Municipality, Vestland
- Coordinates: 61.7327°N 6.7936°E
- Basin countries: Norway
- Max. length: 12 kilometres (7.5 mi)
- Max. width: 1 kilometre (0.62 mi)
- Surface area: 7.9 km^{2} (3.1 sq mi)
- Surface elevation: 34 metres (112 ft)
- References: NVE

Oldevatnet is a lake in Stryn Municipality in Vestland county, Norway. It is located in the valley of Oldedalen. The lake covers an area of 7.9 square kilometres (3.1 sq mi), and has a length of about 12 kilometres (7.5 mi). The river of Oldeelva flows from Oldevatnet via the lake of Floen to Innvikfjorden, a branch of Nordfjord.

== See also ==
- List of lakes in Norway
