= Kjølsdalen =

Village in Stad Municipality, Norway

- Village
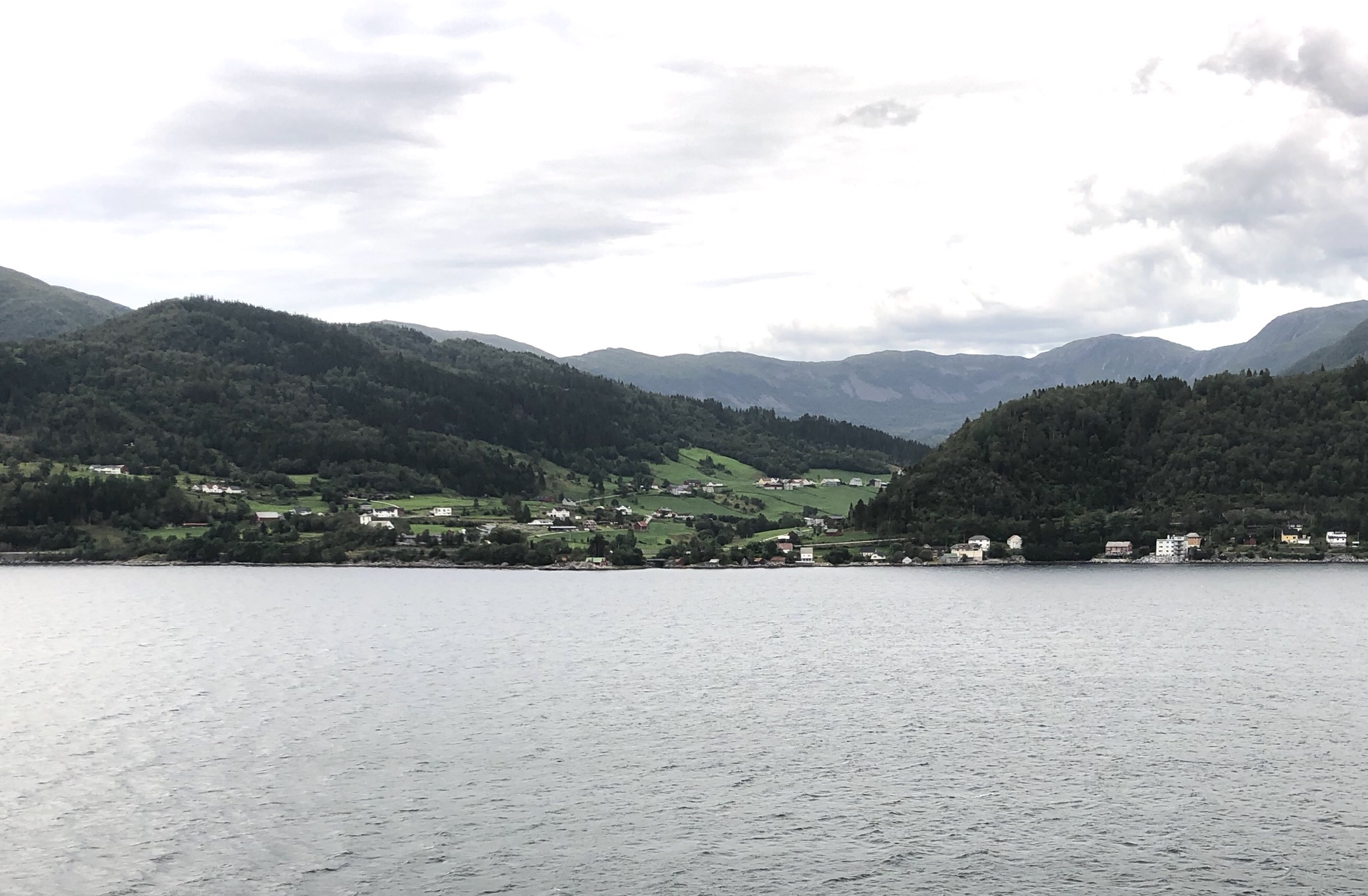
- View of the village in 2019
- Interactive map of Kjølsdalen
- Location within Vestland Location within Norway
- Coordinates: 61.9167°N 5.6292°E
- Country: Norway
- Region: Western Norway
- County: Vestland
- District: Nordfjord
- Municipality: Stad Municipality
- Elevation: 10 m (33 ft)
- Time zone: UTC+01:00 (CET)
  - Summer (DST): UTC+02:00 (CEST)
- Post Code: 6776 Kjølsdalen

Kjølsdalen is a village in Stad Municipality in Vestland county, Norway. The village is located on the northern shore of the Nordfjorden, about 8 kilometres (5.0 mi) west of the village of Stårheim and about 12 kilometres (7.5 mi) east of the village of Bryggja. The village of Davik lies about 5 kilometres (3.1 mi) across the fjord from Kjølsdalen (in neighboring Bremanger Municipality). The village is named after the Kjølsdalen valley in which it is located. Kjølsdalen Church is located in the village.

== History ==
Historically, Kjølsdalen was administratively part of the old Davik Municipality until 1964 when it became part of Eid Municipality. In 2020, Eid Municipality became part of the new Stad Municipality.
