= Totland Church =

Church in Vestland, Norway

- Totland kyrkje
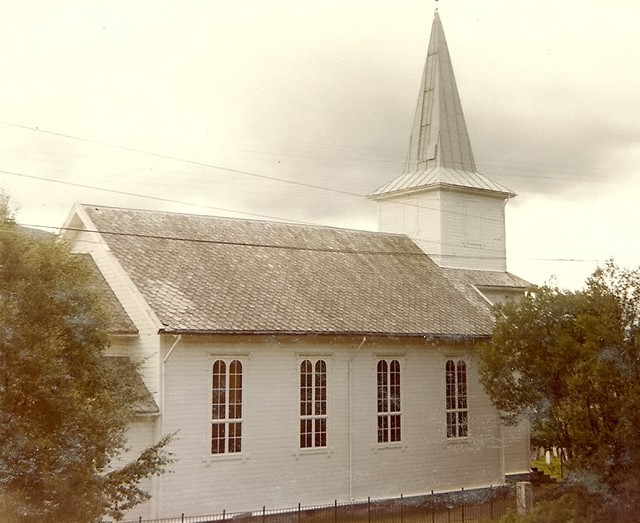
- View of the church
- Totland Church
- 61°55′57″N 5°23′18″E
- Location: Stad Municipality, Vestland
- Country: Norway
- Denomination: Church of Norway
- Churchmanship: Evangelical Lutheran

History
- Status: Parish church
- Founded: 1912
- Consecrated: 8 August 1912

Architecture
- Functional status: Active
- Architect(s): Lars Sølvberg and Jens Sølvberg
- Architectural type: Long church
- Completed: 1912 (114 years ago)

Specifications
- Capacity: 250
- Materials: Wood

Administration
- Diocese: Bjørgvin bispedømme
- Deanery: Nordfjord prosti
- Parish: Totland
- Norwegian Cultural Heritage Site
- Type: Church
- Status: Listed
- ID: 85659

Totland Church (Norwegian: Totland kyrkje) is a parish church of the Church of Norway in Stad Municipality in Vestland county, Norway. It is located in the village of Totland, along the north shore of the Nordfjorden. It is the church for the Totland parish which is part of the Nordfjord prosti (deanery) in the Diocese of Bjørgvin. The white, wooden church was built in a long church design in 1912 using plans drawn up by the architect Lars Sølvberg and Jens Sølvberg. The church seats about 250 people.

== History ==
The church was built in 1912 to serve the people of the old Davik Municipality who lived on the north side of the Nordfjorden. The chapel was designed by Lars Sølvberg and Jens Sølvberg. Lars Sølvberg was originally hired to design the building, but he became ill before they could be completed, so Jens Sølvberg completed the drawings. The building has many similarities to the Sør-Vågsøy Church which Lars Sølvberg designed several years earlier. The building is considerably smaller than that church, however. The chapel was consecrated on 8 August 1912. From 1912 until 1953, the chapel at Totland was an annex chapel of the Rugsund Church parish which was based across the fjord. In 1953, Totland became its own parish (sokn). In 1965, the municipality of Davik was split up and merged into other neighboring municipalities and the parish area of Totland was merged into Vågsøy Municipality until 2020 when it became part of the newly created Stad Municipality.

== See also ==
- List of churches in Bjørgvin
