= Ronny Hafsås =

Norwegian biathlete and cross-country skier

Personal information
- Nationality: Norway
- Born: November 14, 1985 (age 40) Stårheim, Norway

Sport
- Sport: Skiing
- Club: Stårheim IL

World Cup career
- Seasons: 3 – (2007, 2010, 2012)
- Indiv. starts: 3
- Indiv. podiums: 1
- Indiv. wins: 1
- Team starts: 1
- Team podiums: 1
- Team wins: 1
- Overall titles: 0 – (66th in 2010)
- Discipline titles: 0
Medal record
Representing Norway
Men's cross-country skiing
Junior World Championships
Silver medal – second place	2005 Rovaniemi	4 × 10 km relay
Men's biathlon
Youth World Championships
Gold medal – first place	2004 Haute Maurienne	3 × 7.5 km relay

Ronny André Hafsås (born November 14, 1985) is a retired Norwegian biathlete and cross-country skier.

== Biathlon career ==
Hafsås first competed in the Biathlon World Cup in Pyeongchang, South Korea in February 2008. His initial appearance (in a 10 km sprint) was spoiled by bad shooting, but he earned the first World Cup points of his career in the pursuit that followed, with a 21st place. Hafsås claimed his first top ten placing in the World Cup the next week, placing ninth in another sprint in Khanty-Mansiysk.

Hafsås' best finish in the Biathlon World Cup so far is a sixth place, which he earned (again in a sprint) during the opening weekend of the 2008-09 season at Östersund.

== Cross-country skiing career ==
As a cross-country skier, Hafsås has two World Cup victories (one individual and one in a relay), both of which he earned during the opening weekend of the 2009-10 Cross-Country Skiing World Cup in Beitostølen, Norway. On November 21, 2009, Hafsås, who had been better established at the professional level as a biathlete, surprisingly won the 15 km freestyle individual competition that opened the year, by the very narrow margin of 0.2 seconds ahead of Vincent Vittoz. This earned him a spot in the Norwegian team for the next day's 4 × 10 km relay. Hafsås' performance on the third leg was not as stellar as the day before, as he gave up some ground to Alexander Legkov of Russia and René Sommerfeldt of Germany; however, Norway still won thanks to Petter Northug as the anchor.

At the 2010 Winter Olympics, he finished 42nd in the 15 km event.

Hafsås retired after the 2012–13 season after having been hampered by illness for three seasons.

== Cross-country skiing results ==
All results are sourced from the International Ski Federation (FIS).

=== Olympic Games ===
Year	Age	15 km individual	30 km skiathlon	50 km mass start	Sprint	4 × 10 km relay	Team sprint
2010	24	42	—	—	—	—	—

=== World Cup ===
==== Season standings ====
Season	Age	Discipline standings			Ski Tour standings		
Season	Age	Overall	Distance	Sprint	Nordic Opening	Tour de Ski	World Cup Final
2007	21	NC	NC	—	—N/a	—	—N/a
2010	24	66	37	—	—N/a	—	—
2012	26	NC	NC	—	—	—	—

==== Individual podiums ====
- 1 victory – (1 WC)
- 1 podium – (1 WC)

No.	Season	Date	Location	Race	Level	Place
1	2009–10	21 November 2009	Beitostølen, Norway	15 km Individual F	World Cup	1st

==== Team podiums ====
- 1 victory – (1 RL)
- 1 podium – (1 RL)

No.	Season	Date	Location	Race	Level	Place	Teammates
1	2009–10	22 November 2009	Beitostølen, Norway	4 × 10 km Relay C/F	World Cup	1st	Rønning / Sundby / Northug
