= Isane =

Village in Bremanger Municipality, Norway

- Village
- Interactive map of Isane
- Location within Vestland Location within Norway
- Coordinates: 61.8774°N 5.7150°E
- Country: Norway
- Region: Western Norway
- County: Vestland
- District: Nordfjord
- Municipality: Bremanger Municipality
- Elevation: 37 m (121 ft)
- Time zone: UTC+01:00 (CET)
  - Summer (DST): UTC+02:00 (CEST)
- Post Code: 6737 Ålfoten

Isane is a village in Bremanger Municipality in Vestland county, Norway. It has a ferry connection to the village of Stårheim, located about 4 kilometres (2.5 mi) northeast across the Nordfjorden in Stad Municipality. The population (2001) of Isane was 42. Since 2006, the village has become an important seaport for importing yellowfin tuna.

The village of Isane is located at the confluence of the river Storelva and the Nordfjorden, about 11 kilometres (6.8 mi) east of the village of Davik and about 6 kilometres (3.7 mi) north of the village of Ålfoten. Reaching an elevation of 1,094 metres (3,589 ft), the mountain Kvasshornet sits just to the west of Isane.
