= Totland, Vestland =

Village in Stad Municipality, Norway

Totland
- Village
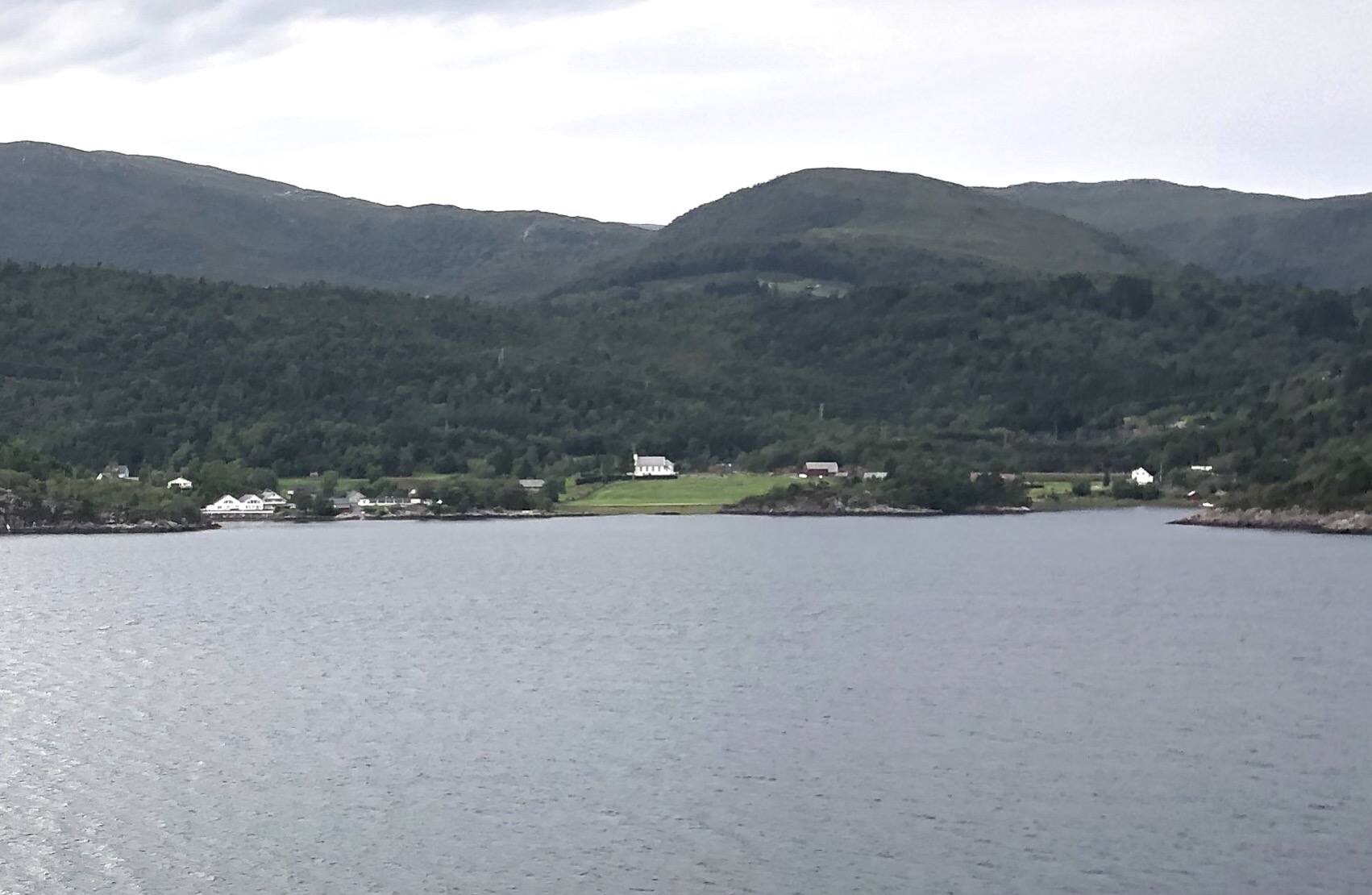
- View of the village
- Interactive map of Totland
- Location within Vestland Location within Norway
- Coordinates: 61.9322°N 5.3869°E
- Country: Norway
- Region: Western Norway
- County: Vestland
- District: Nordfjord
- Municipality: Stad Municipality
- Elevation: 8 m (26 ft)
- Time zone: UTC+01:00 (CET)
  - Summer (DST): UTC+02:00 (CEST)
- Post Code: 6711 Bryggja

Totland is a village in Stad Municipality in Vestland county, Norway. The village is located on the northern shore of the Nordfjorden, immediately east of the larger village of Bryggja and about 18 kilometres (11 mi) east of the town of Måløy. The village is the site of Totland Church.

== History ==
The area was part of the old Davik Municipality until 1964 when it became part of Vågsøy Municipality. On 1 January 2020, the Totland - Maurstad - Bryggja areas became part of the newly-created Stad Municipality.
