= Davik (village) =

Village in Bremanger Municipality, Norway

- Village
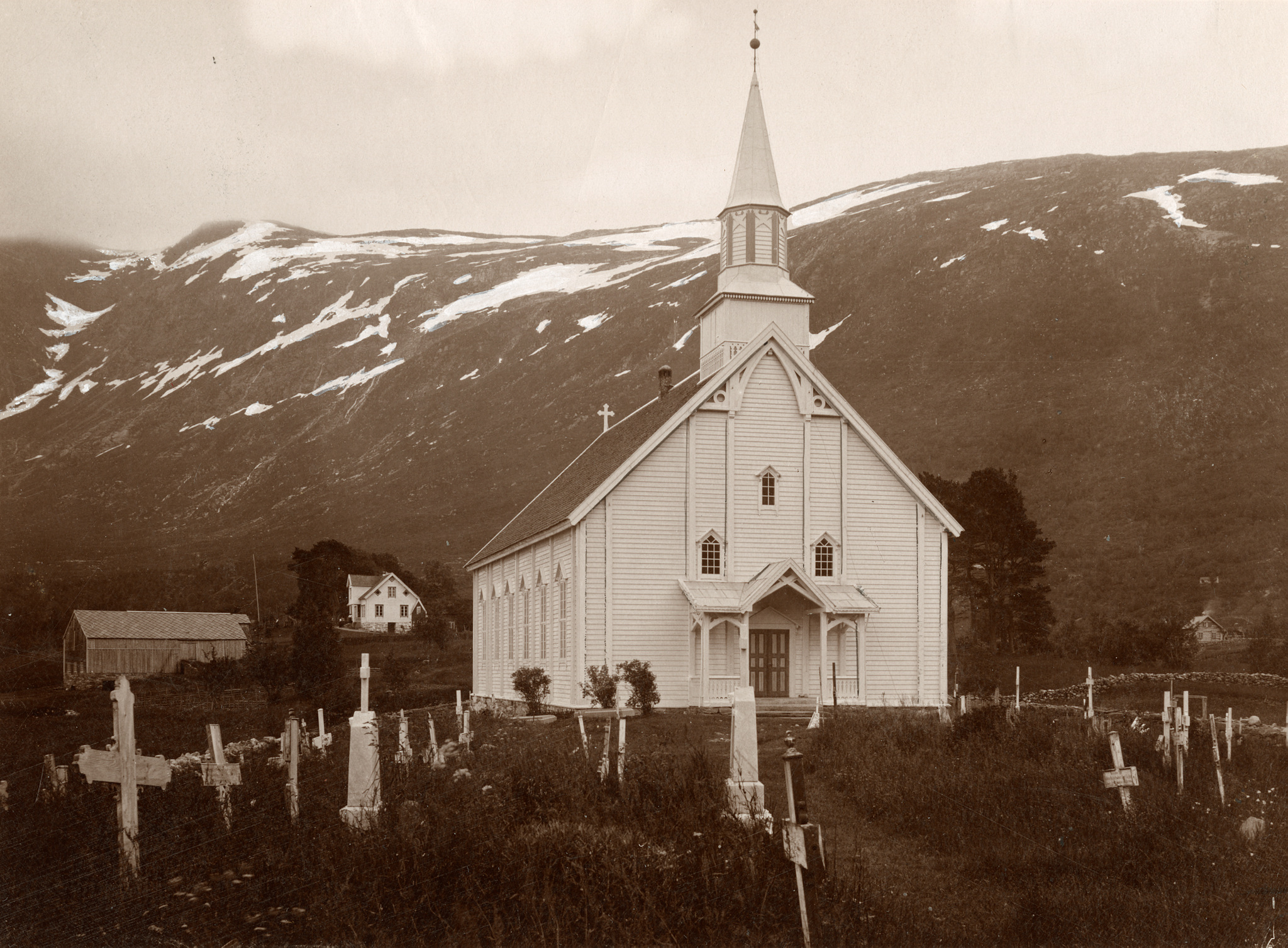
- View of the village
- Interactive map of Davik
- Location within Vestland Location within Norway
- Coordinates: 61.8916°N 5.5316°E
- Country: Norway
- Region: Western Norway
- County: Vestland
- District: Nordfjord
- Municipality: Bremanger Municipality
- Elevation: 13 m (43 ft)
- Time zone: UTC+01:00 (CET)
  - Summer (DST): UTC+02:00 (CEST)
- Post Code: 6730 Davik

Davik is a village in Bremanger Municipality in Vestland county, Norway. The village is located on the southern shore of the Nordfjorden, about 11 kilometres (6.8 mi) west of the village of Isane and about 13 kilometres (8.1 mi) east of the village of Rugsund. The village of Kjølsdalen lies across the fjord from Davik. The population of the village (in 2001) was about 330 residents.

== History ==
The village of Davik was the administrative centre of the old Davik Municipality which was in existence from 1838 until 1964 when it was dissolved and its lands were split between three other municipalities. Some of the municipal services were based in the village of Davik, while others were located in Bryggja which was a larger urban area. Davik Church has been located in the village for centuries.

=== Name ===
The village is named after the old Davik farm (Old Norse: Dafvíkr), since the first Davik Church was located there. The first element (Old Norse: dafi) means "spear" and the last element (Old Norse: víkr) is identical with the word vik which means "inlet", so the name appears to be referring to the long, skinny spear-like shape of the local fjord.
