= Stårheim IL =

Norwegian sports club

Stårheim Idrettslag is a Norwegian sports club from Stårheim, Sogn og Fjordane. It has sections for association football, handball, track and field, cross-country skiing, ski jumping, and biathlon.

The club was founded in 1935. World Cup biathlete Ronny Hafsås represents the club, so does the ski jumper Akseli Kokkonen.
