= Gunvald Ludvigsen =

Norwegian politician (born 1949)

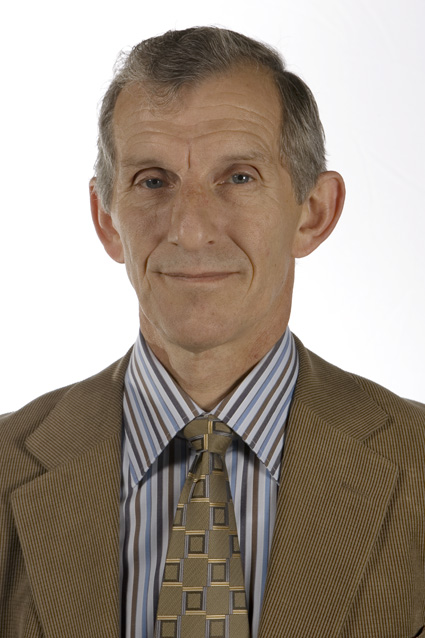
Gunvald Ludvigsen

Gunvald Ludvigsen (born 15 February 1949 in Leirfjord Municipality) is a Norwegian politician for the Liberal Party.

He was elected to the Norwegian Parliament from Sogn og Fjordane in 2005.

Ludvigsen held various positions in the municipal council from Eid Municipality from 1991 to 1995 and 1999 to 2005, serving the last two years as mayor.
