= Harpefossen =

Ski area in Norway

Coordinates: 61.957312°N 5.930142°E

Harpefossen (often referred to as Harpefossen Skisenter) is a winter sports resort and year-round outdoor recreation area located in the Hjelmelandsdalen valley in Stad Municipality, Vestland county, Norway. Situated approximately 11 kilometers from the administrative center of Nordfjordeid, it is the largest ski facility in the Nordfjord region.

== Facilities and winter sports ==
The resort features a network of alpine slopes, off-piste terrain, and a dedicated children's ski area. The base of the facility is located at an elevation of 300 meters above sea level, with the highest lifts reaching approximately 815 meters.

Harpefossen also serves as a central hub for cross-country skiing in the region. It maintains a network of groomed and floodlit trails, some of which follow the historic Trondhjemske postvei (the old postal road connecting Nordfjord and Sunnmøre) through five traditional mountain farm areas (setrer). The resort is a participating member of the "Alpepass" system, a regional ticketing collaboration that includes nine major ski centers across Western Norway.

== Infrastructure and summer use ==
While primarily established as a winter destination, the area operates as a year-round recreational gateway. During the summer months, the terrain is utilized for downhill mountain biking, hiking, and features a local pumptrack.

The immediate vicinity of the ski center includes significant regional tourism infrastructure, notably the Harpefossen Hyttegrend. This residential cabin and apartment development provides direct slope access and seasonal accommodation. The development supports the broader tourism ecosystem of Stad municipality by facilitating extended visitor stays outside the main Nordfjordeid village center.
