= Stårheim =

Village in Stad Municipality, Norway

Stårheim Torvika
- Village
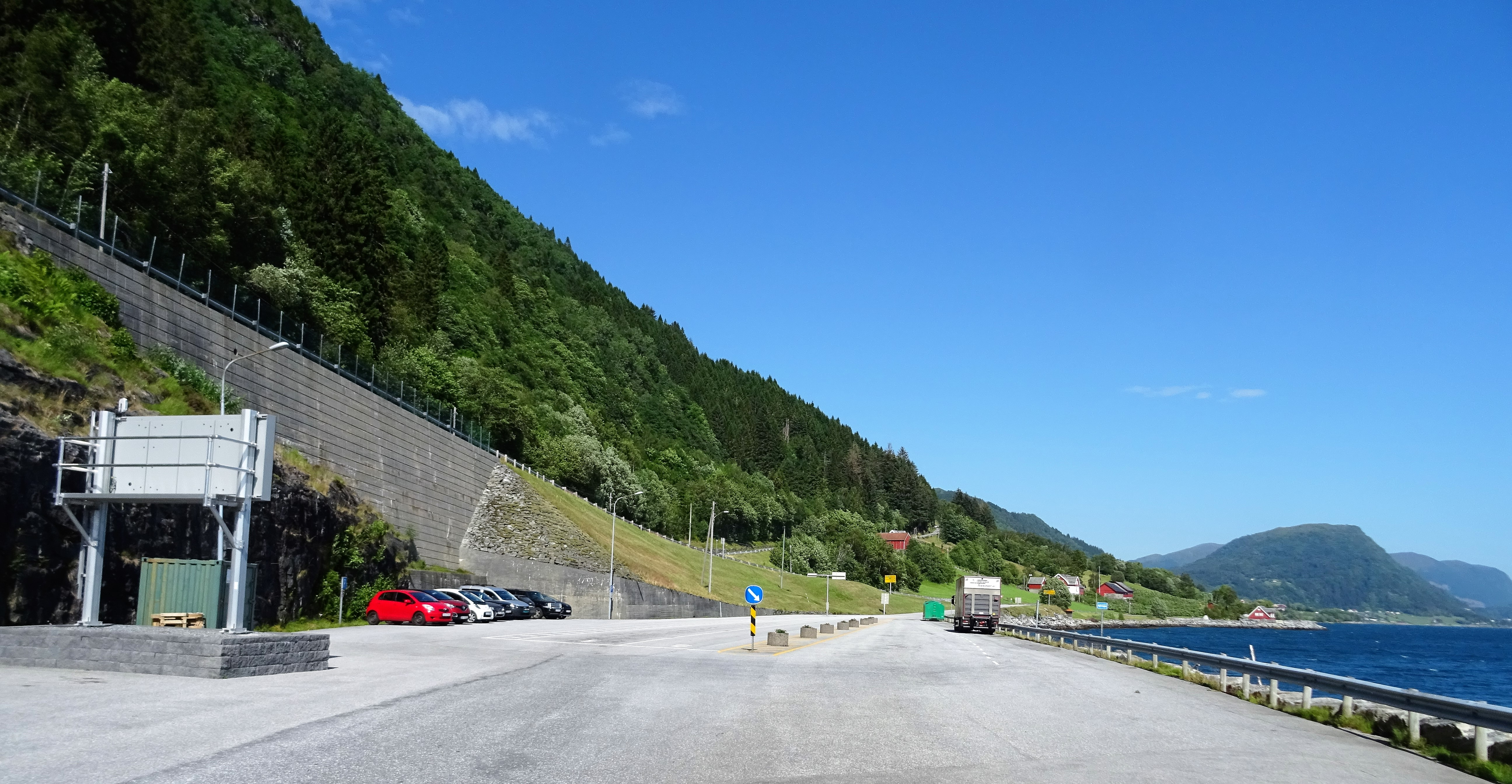
- View of the village ferry quay
- Interactive map of Stårheim
- Location within Vestland Location within Norway
- Coordinates: 61.9188°N 5.7612°E
- Country: Norway
- Region: Western Norway
- County: Vestland
- District: Nordfjord
- Municipality: Stad Municipality

Area
  - Total: 0.25 km^{2} (0.097 sq mi)
- Elevation: 2 m (6.6 ft)

Population (2024)
  - Total: 252
  - Density: 1,008/km^{2} (2,610/sq mi)
- Time zone: UTC+01:00 (CET)
  - Summer (DST): UTC+02:00 (CEST)
- Post Code: 6777 Stårheim

Stårheim (or Torvika) is a village in Stad Municipality in Vestland county, Norway. Stårheim is located in the central part of Stad Municipality on the north shore of the Nordfjorden, about 12 kilometres (7.5 mi) west of the municipal center of Nordfjordeid and about 8 kilometres (5.0 mi) east of the village of Kjølsdalen. There is a regularly scheduled ferry route from Stårheim to the small village of Isane (in Bremanger Municipality), located about 4 kilometres (2.5 mi) south across the Nordfjorden.

The village stretches along the shore of the fjord. The urban centre of the village is called Torvika by Statistics Norway. The 0.25-square-kilometre (62-acre) urban area has a population (2024) of 252 and a population density of 1,008 inhabitants per square kilometre (2,610/sq mi).

== Church ==
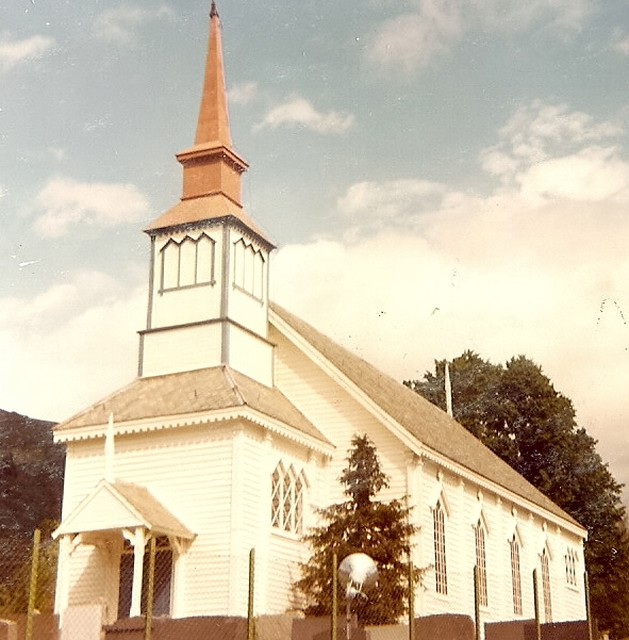
Stårheim Church

Stårheim Church is the parish church located in the village of Stårheim. It is part of the Diocese of Bjørgvin and the Nordfjord prosti (deanery). The church building, which was constructed during 1864, can seat 340 people. It was built from drawings by architect Christian Heinrich Grosch.

== History ==
Arne Ivarsson (Árni Ívarsson á Stoðreimi), a prominent lendmann from Stårheim during the 12th century, was a husband of Ingrid Ragnvaldsdotter, mother of King Inge I of Norway. Their son, Nicholas Arnesson, became the Bishop of Oslo.

== Sports ==
The local sports team is Stårheim IL.

== Notable people ==
Stårheim is the home of a few celebrities, most notably journalist Karoline Vårda and Olympic biathelete Johan-Olav Botn.
