= Stårheim Church =

Church in Vestland, Norway

- Stårheim kyrkje
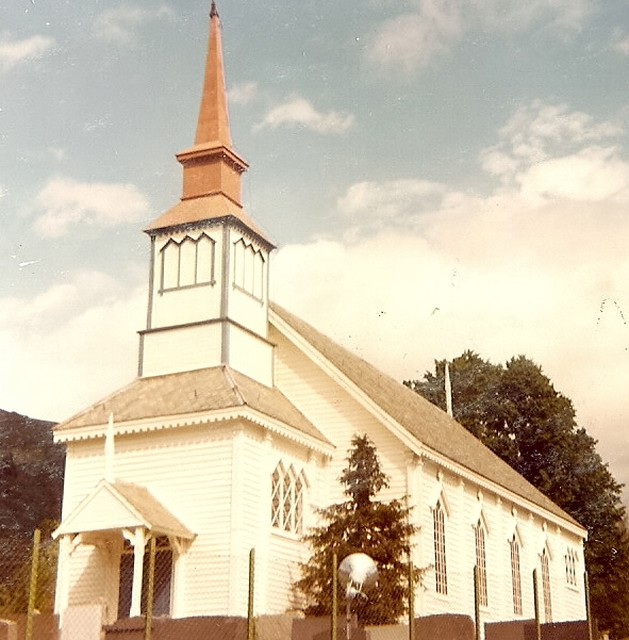
- View of the church
- Stårheim Church
- 61°55′07″N 5°45′57″E
- Location: Stad Municipality, Vestland
- Country: Norway
- Denomination: Church of Norway
- Churchmanship: Evangelical Lutheran

History
- Status: Parish church
- Founded: 12th century
- Consecrated: 4 Dec 1864

Architecture
- Functional status: Active
- Architect: Christian Heinrich Grosch
- Architectural type: Long church
- Completed: 1864 (162 years ago)

Specifications
- Capacity: 350
- Materials: Wood

Administration
- Diocese: Bjørgvin bispedømme
- Deanery: Nordfjord prosti
- Parish: Stårheim
- Norwegian Cultural Heritage Site
- Type: Church
- Status: Listed
- ID: 84994

Stårheim Church (Norwegian: Stårheim kyrkje) is a parish church of the Church of Norway in Stad Municipality in Vestland county, Norway. It is located in the village of Stårheim. It is the church for the Stårheim parish which is part of the Nordfjord prosti (deanery) in the Diocese of Bjørgvin. The white, wooden church was built in a long church design in 1864 using plans drawn up by the architect Christian Heinrich Grosch. The church seats about 350 people.

== History ==
The earliest existing historical records of the church date back to 1324, but the church was not new that year. The first church was a wooden stave church that was likely built in the 12th century. That old church was in use until 1338. Not much is known about the original church, but in 1338 Erling Vidkunsson wrote a letter to Bishop Haakon in Bergen that some robbers had broken into the church and set it on fire. A second stave church was built on the same site in 1341 to replace the one that burned. This new church was designated as an annex chapel for the Eid Church parish. Around the year 1600, the old church was torn down and a new timber-framed long church was built on the same site. On 10 January 1859, a large fire heavily damaged the structure. Planning for a new church began soon after. Christian Heinrich Grosch was hired as the architect and Gjert Lien was hired as the lead builder. Construction took place in 1864. The new building was consecrated on 4 December 1864 by the Provost Wilhelm Frimann Koren. In 1946, electric light and heat were installed in the church.

== See also ==
- List of churches in Bjørgvin
