= Davik Church =

Church in Vestland, Norway

- Davik kyrkje
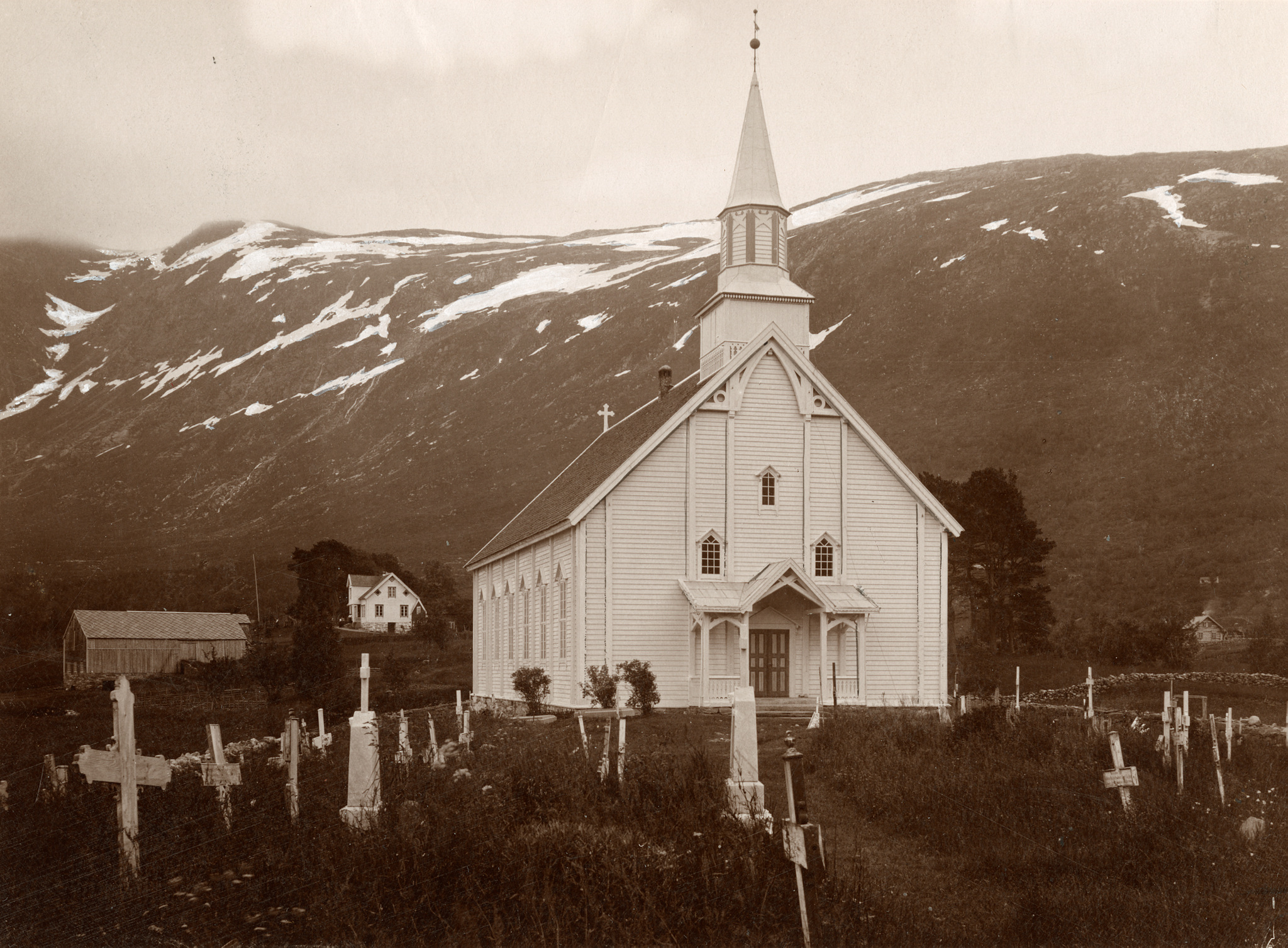
- View of the church
- Davik Church
- 61°53′31″N 5°31′57″E
- Location: Bremanger Municipality, Vestland
- Country: Norway
- Denomination: Church of Norway
- Previous denomination: Catholic Church
- Churchmanship: Evangelical Lutheran
- Website: kyrkja.no/bremanger

History
- Status: Parish church
- Founded: 13th century
- Consecrated: 6 July 1886

Architecture
- Functional status: Active
- Architect: Georg Andreas Bull
- Architectural type: Long church
- Completed: 1886 (140 years ago)

Specifications
- Capacity: 500
- Materials: Wood

Administration
- Diocese: Bjørgvin bispedømme
- Deanery: Nordfjord prosti
- Parish: Davik
- Norwegian Cultural Heritage Site
- Type: Church
- Status: Listed
- ID: 84021

Davik Church (Norwegian: Davik kyrkje) is a parish church of the Church of Norway in Bremanger Municipality in Vestland county, Norway. It is located in the village of Davik. It is the church for the Davik parish which is part of the Nordfjord prosti (deanery) in the Diocese of Bjørgvin. The white, wooden church was built in a long church style in 1886 by the architect Georg Andreas Bull. The church seats about 500 people.

It was consecrated on 6 July 1886 by the Bishop Fredrik Waldemar Hvoslef. The church was built near the site of a previous cruciform church which had become too small for the congregation. There was some controversy as to where the new (present) church was to be built. Many wanted the church to be built on the other side of the Nordfjorden, but the people on the south side protested, and it was finally decided to build the new church near the old church.

== Building ==
The church itself is not particularly long, but it is unusually wide. Before the pipe organ was installed in the gallery in 1933, the church could seat 700 people. Davik Church is thus one of the biggest in the county. The chancel and the nave are partitioned only by a low balustrade, and have the same width as the porch. The square chancel has permanent benches along the side walls. The pew seats are painted blue, and otherwise oak-coloured with individual numbers for the various farms and families. The slanted ceiling in the nave and chancel are painted white, but towards the side walls of the nave, the ceiling is lowered and flat. The church room has columns supporting the gallery as well as functioning as roof supports to the sides. Along the walls there are five pointed-arch windows on either side, with green and red top sections. The altar rail is oval with a white-painted balustrade, similar to the low chancel partition. The usual vestries are located behind the chancel. On the western wall is the spacious porch with stairways on either side leading up to the gallery. In the corners of the porch there are small rooms with toilet facilities.

The steeple is placed on the roof ridge itself. The turret base is square, the steeple is octagonal and the spire is covered with copper. The impression of an unusually big and fine church is strengthened precisely because of its wide west wall and the pure, elegant lines in the architecture.

== History ==
The earliest existing historical records of the church date back to 1330, but the church was already existing at that time. The first church in Davik was a wooden stave church was likely built during the 13th century. Not much is known about that church. The medieval church was torn down in 1655. In 1655, a small, wooden long church was built on the same location to replace it. The church must not have been well-built because in 1686 (when it was only 31 years old) it was described as being "very fragile". In 1701, the tower was torn down and rebuilt. In 1750 (when the church was only 95 years old), it was torn down and replaced by a timber-framed cruciform church on a site about 40 metres (130 ft) southeast of the old church site.

In 1814, this church served as an election church (Norwegian: valgkirke). Together with more than 300 other parish churches across Norway, it was a polling station for elections to the 1814 Norwegian Constituent Assembly which wrote the Constitution of Norway. This was Norway's first national elections. Each church parish was a constituency that elected people called "electors" who later met together in each county to elect the representatives for the assembly that was to meet at Eidsvoll Manor later that year.

By the late 1800s, the parish had grown too much and the existing church was too small to hold the congregation. The new church would be built about 40 metres (130 ft) to the southeast of the old church. The construction of the new church was based on Georg Bull's drawings for the nearby Vanylven Church and Gjert Lien from Nordfjordeid was the lead builder. Work on the new church began in May 1885. This new church was extraordinarily wide for a long church design, originally seating about 700 people. The new church was consecrated on 6 July 1886 by the Bishop Fredrik Waldemar Hvoslef. Soon after the new church was put into use, the older church was torn down.

== See also ==
- List of churches in Bjørgvin
