= Nordfjord =

- District
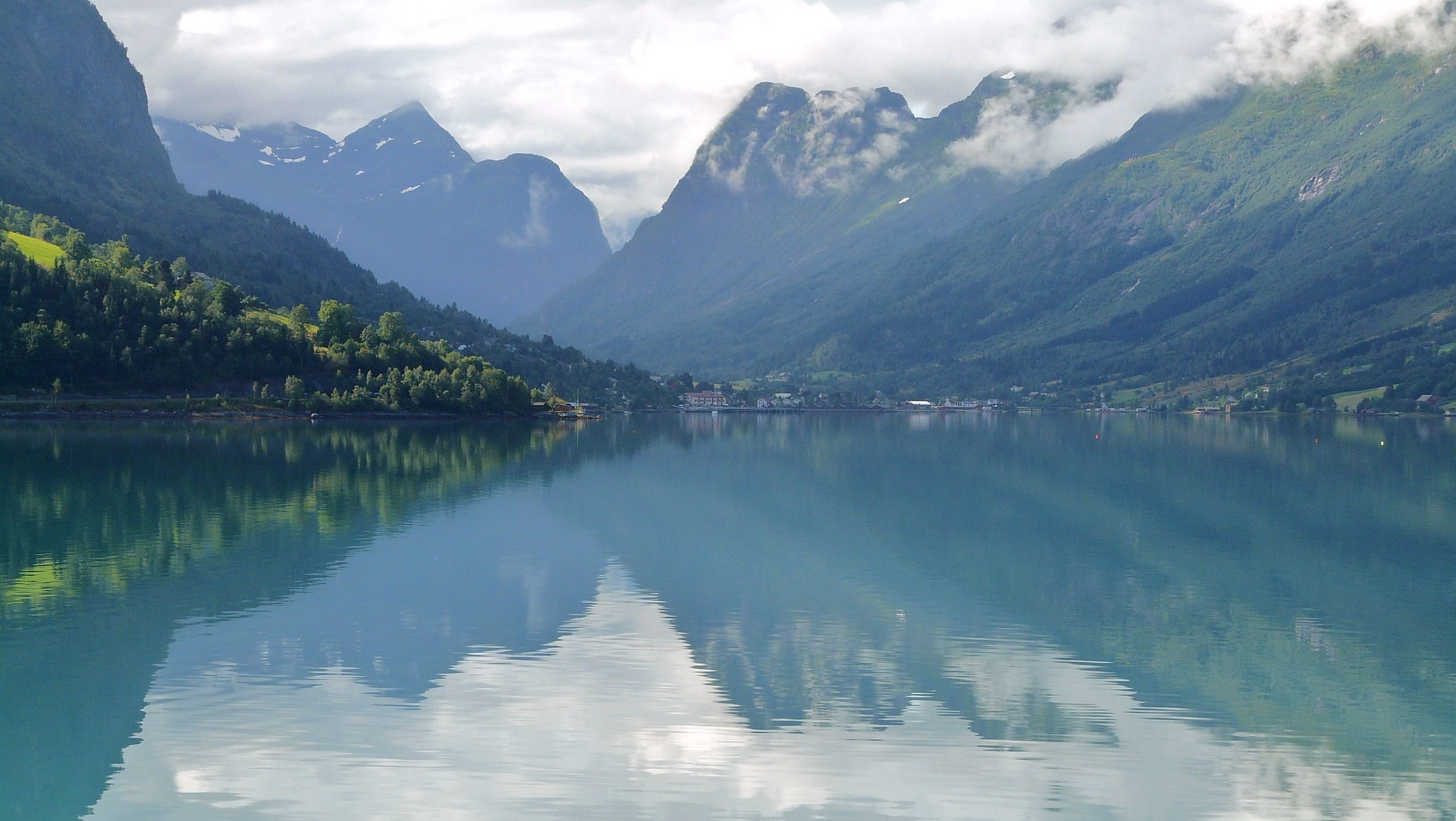

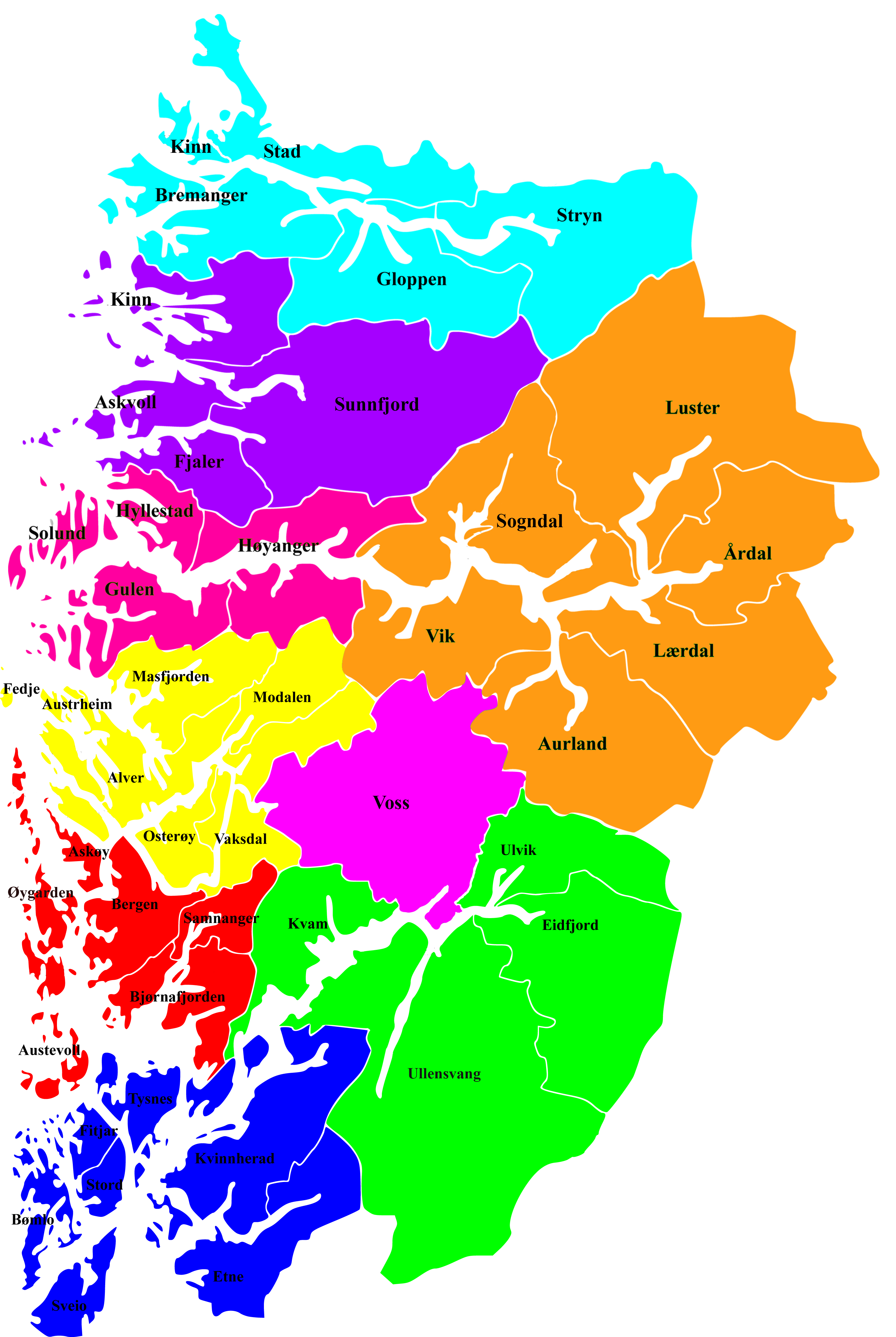
- Districts of Vestland: Nordfjord Sunnfjord Indre Sogn Ytre Sogn Nordhordland Midthordland Sunnhordland Hardanger Voss
- Coordinates: 61°55′34″N 5°08′40″E
- Country: Norway
- County: Vestland
- Region: Vestlandet
- Largest town: Måløy

Area
  - Total: 3,472 km^{2} (1,341 sq mi)

Population (2005)
  - Total: 28,816
  - Density: 8.300/km^{2} (21.50/sq mi)
- Demonym: Nordfjording

Nordfjord (lit. 'Northern fjord'—in contrast to Sunnfjord) is a traditional district in Vestland county, Norway. The capital of the district is Nordfjordeid.

== Origin ==
Following the Viking Age, it was common practice to divide large counties into two halves (halvfylke). Firdafylke was split geographically into Nordfirda halvfylke and Sunnfirda halvfylke. Over the centuries, these names were contracted to form the modern traditional districts of Nordfjord and Sunnfjord in Vestland county.

== Geography ==
The region is located in the northern part of Vestland county in Western Norway. It centers on the Nordfjord and it comprises Stad Municipality, Kinn Municipality, Bremanger Municipality, Gloppen Municipality, and Stryn Municipality. The Nordfjord region covers an area of about 4,300 square kilometres (1,700 sq mi) and is home to a population (2015) of approximately 32,838.

The fjord is the sixth longest in Norway stretching 106 kilometres (66 mi) from the island of Husevågøy at the mouth to the village of Loen at the other end. The region encompasses the rough coastline of the Stadlandet peninsula to the Jostedalsbreen, Europe's largest mainland glacier. The region also includes the lake Hornindalsvatnet, Europe's deepest lake at 514 metres (1,686 ft). The glacier Briksdalsbreen is particularly scenic. The Stryn area and Harpefossen in Nordfjordeid provides year-round alpine skiing, and there are numerous old fishing communities along the fjord going back to pre-Viking times.

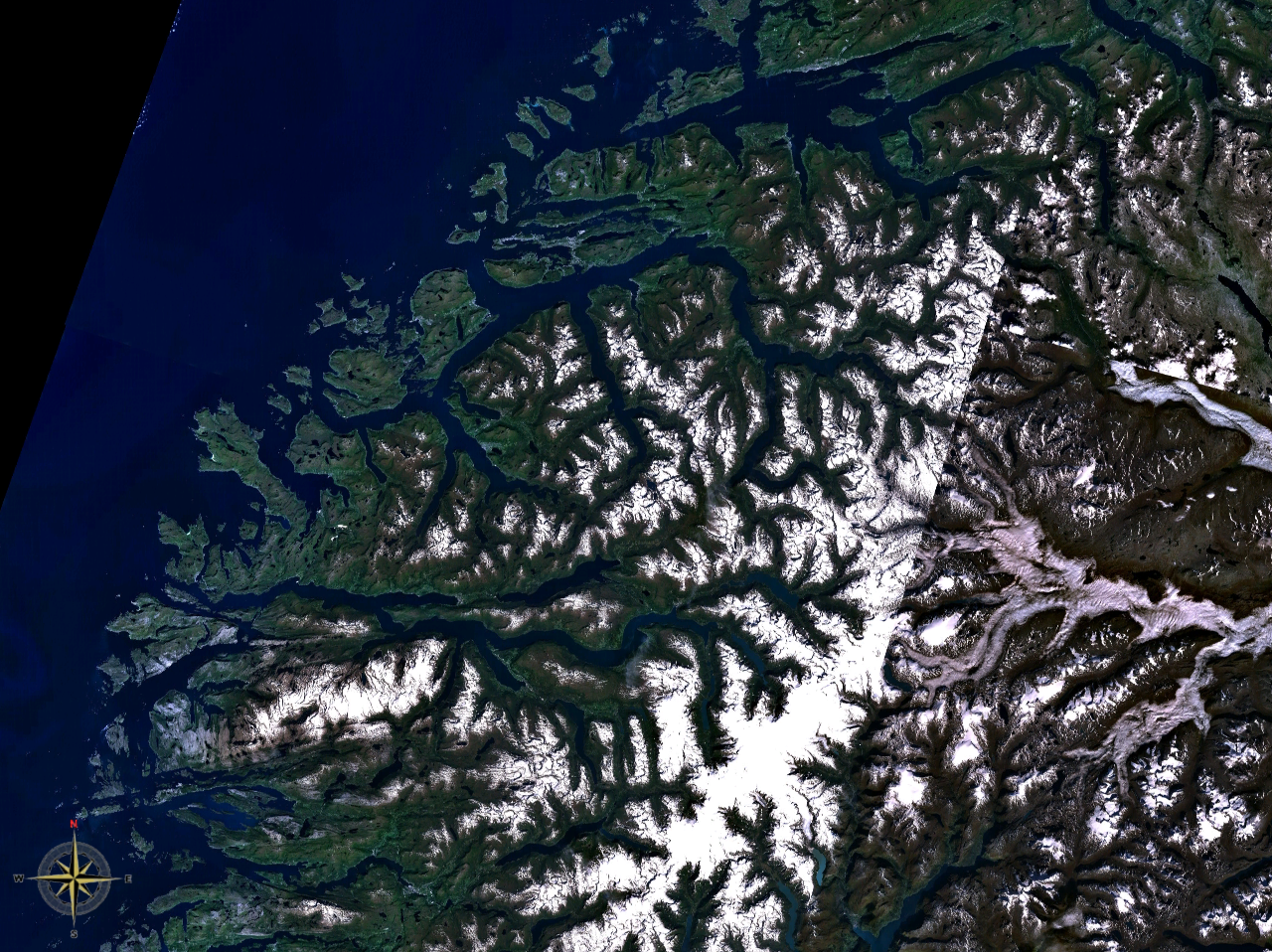
Satellite view of Romsdal, Sunnmøre and Nordfjord.

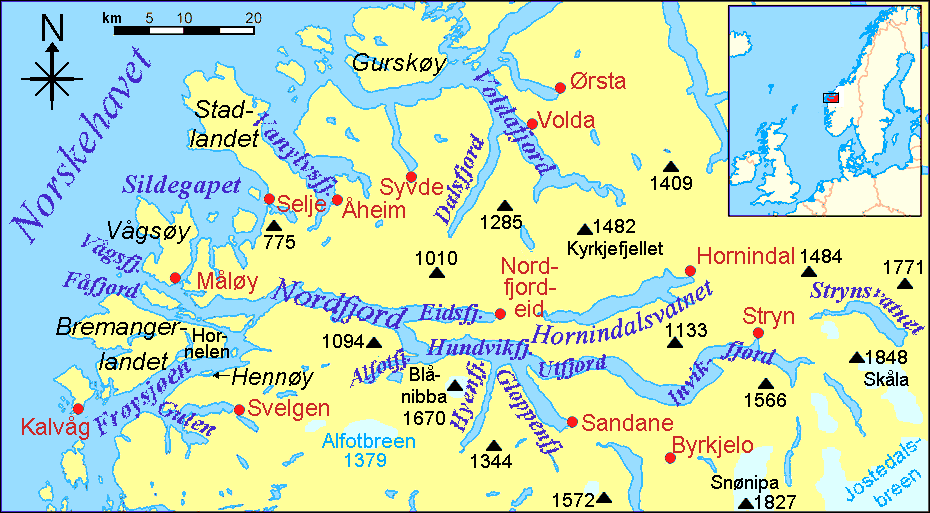
Map of Nordfjorden with branches and surroundings.

== Population ==
Historical population
Year	1769	1951	1960	1970	1980	1990	2000	2010	2020(est)	2030(est)
Pop.	13,171	28,234	33,107	33,657	34,283	34,033	33,157	32,464	32,029	32,066
±%	—	+114.4%	+17.3%	+1.7%	+1.9%	−0.7%	−2.6%	−2.1%	−1.3%	+0.1%
Source: Statistics Norway
