= Nordfjorden (Vestland) =

Fjord in Vestland, Norway

Nordfjord
- Nordfjorden
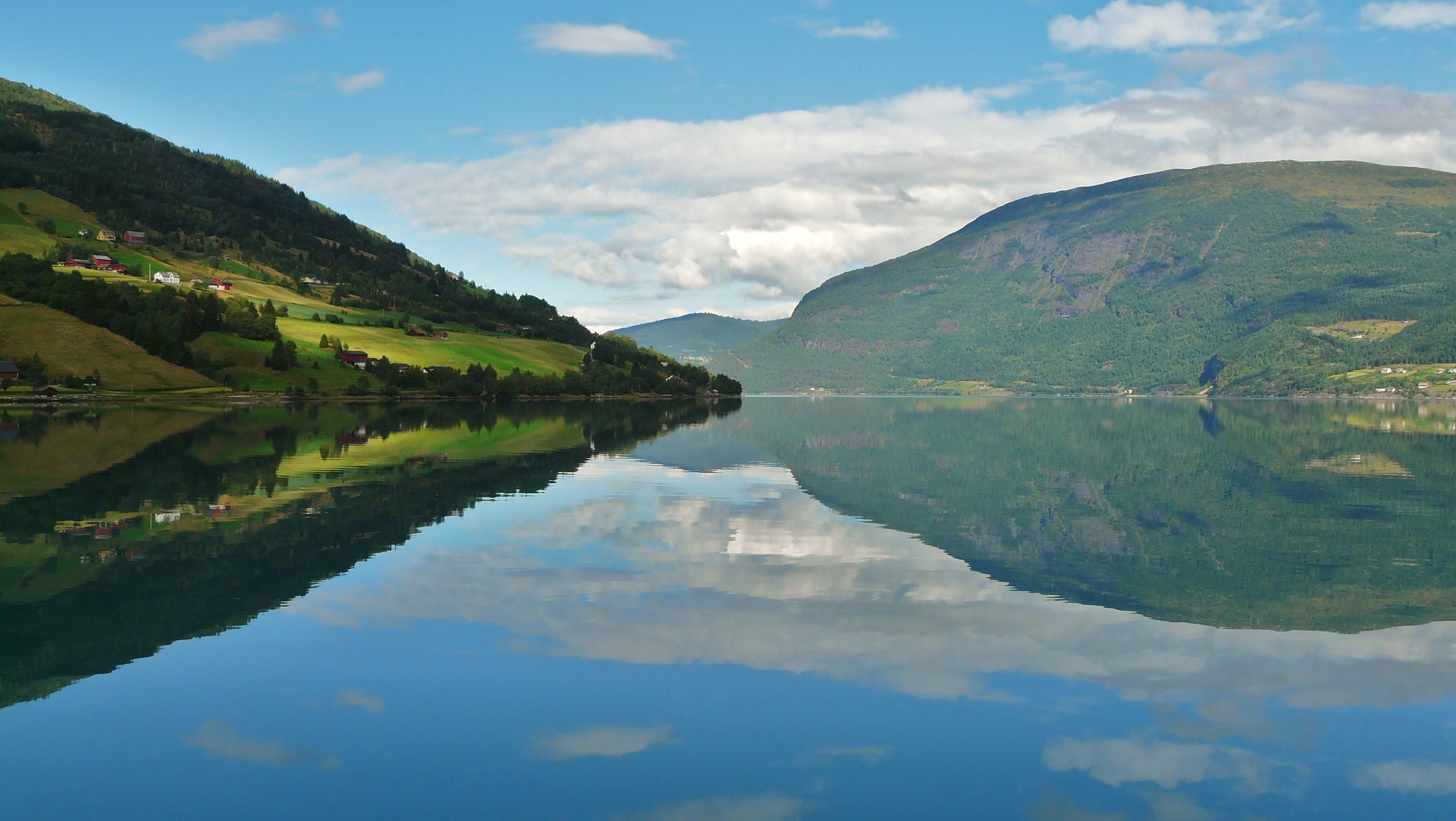
- View of the fjord
- Interactive map of the fjord
- Location: Vestland county, Norway
- Coordinates: 61.8963°N 5.2759°E
- Type: Fjord
- Basin countries: Norway
- Max. length: 106 kilometres (66 mi)
- Max. width: 2.5 kilometres (1.6 mi)
- Max. depth: 565 metres (1,854 ft)
- Islands: Husevågøy
- Settlements: Nordfjordeid Måløy Sandane Stryn

Nordfjord or Nordfjorden is the sixth longest fjord in Norway. It's located in the northern part of Vestland county, flowing through the municipalities of Stryn, Gloppen, Stad, Bremanger, and Kinn. It is the central feature of the entire Nordfjord region, which makes up the northern third of the county.

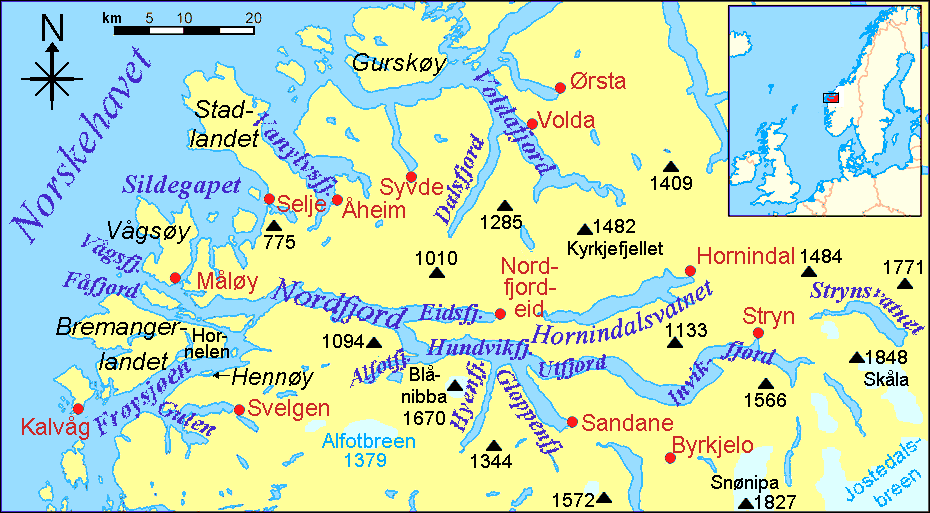
Map of the fjord and surrounding areas

The 106-kilometre (66 mi) long fjord stretches from Husevågøy island in Kinn Municipality to the village of Loen in Stryn Municipality. The fjord begins as runoff from the Jostedalsbreen, Europe's largest mainland glacier, in the east, and flows westward, emptying into the ocean just south of the Stadlandet peninsula. The mouth of the fjord lies between the large islands of Vågsøy and Bremangerlandet (with the smaller island of Husevågøy lying in the middle of the mouth).

There are several smaller fjords which branch off the main Nordfjorden: Eidsfjorden, Ålfotfjorden, Hyefjorden, and Gloppefjorden. The fjord reaches a maximum depth of 565 metres (1,854 ft) near the mouth of the Eidsfjorden and also by the village of Bryggja.

== Transportation ==
The fjord has no road or rail crossings, but it has three regular ferry crossings. There is an electric ferry from Anda to Lote as part of the European route E39 highway, using 75 kWh per crossing. Another crossing is from Isane to Stårheim. The final crossing is near the mouth of the fjord from the town of Måløy to Oldeide. This final crossing also includes a stop at the island of Husevågøy in the middle of the fjord.

== Settlements ==
There are numerous old fishing communities located along the fjord that date back to pre-Viking times. Some of the notable population centers along the fjord include the town of Måløy (near the north side of the mouth in Kinn Municipality), the villages of Bryggja and Totland, Kjølsdalen, Stårheim, Nordfjordeid, and Lote (in Stad Municipality); Rugsund, Davik, and Ålfoten (in Bremanger Municipality); Sandane and Gimmestad (in Gloppen Municipality); and Randabygda, Utvik, Innvik, Roset, Stryn, Olden, and Loen (in Stryn Municipality).

The commercial hub of the Nordfjord is the village of Nordfjordeid.

== Tourism ==
The Nordfjord is visited by hundreds of cruise ships. In 2023 there was in total 263 calls between the ports of Nordfjordeid, Olden and Måløy. With a total passenger volume of 621 560. 90% of the cruise traffic is between the months of May and September.

== Media gallery ==
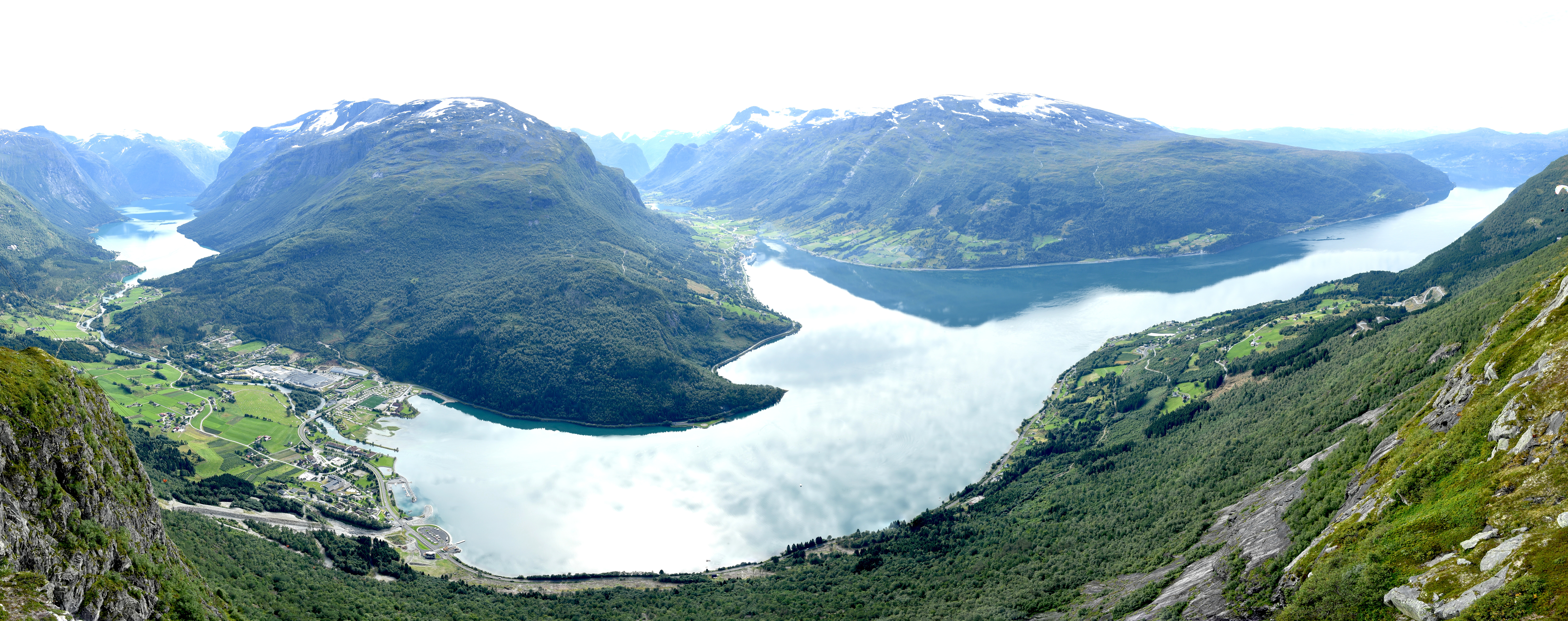
Panorama of the Nordfjord from the mountain Hoven. The lake Lovatnet can be seen in the left part of the image

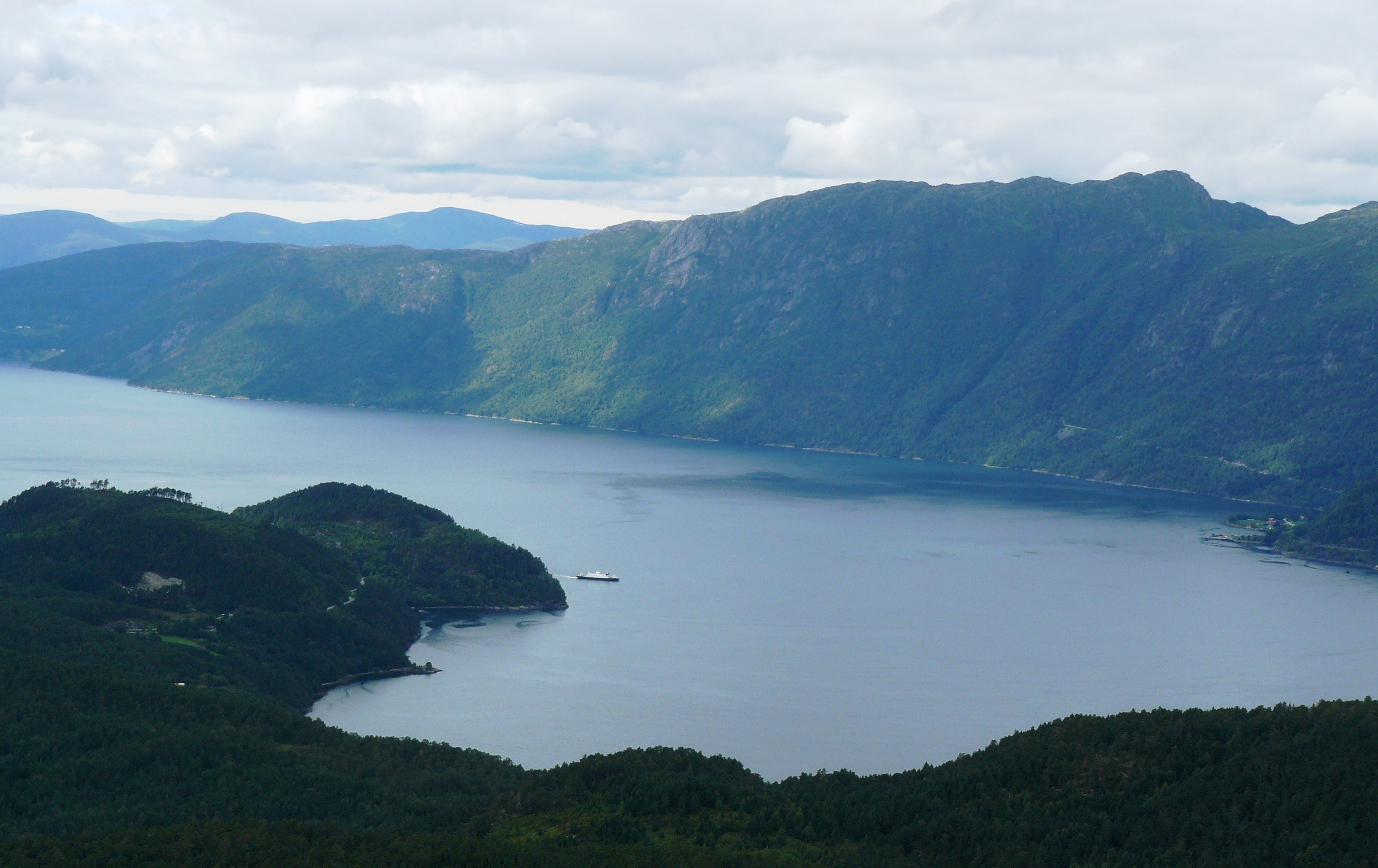
View of the Anda-Lote ferry crossing

== See also ==
- List of Norwegian fjords
