= List of museums in Norway =

This is a list of museums in Norway.

== By County ==
=== Akershus ===
- Eidsvollsbygningen
- Henie-Onstad Art Centre
- Kjeller Airport
- Norwegian Armed Forces Aircraft Collection
- Oscarsborg Fortress
- Urskog–Høland Line

=== Aust-Agder ===
- Lillesand Town- and Maritime Museum
- Rygnestadtunet
- Tveitetunet

=== Buskerud ===
- Ål Bygdamuseum
- Blaafarveværket
- Dagali Museum
- Drammen Museum of Art and Cultural History
- Gol Bygdetun
- Gulskogen Manor
- Hallingdal Museum
- Hemsedal Bygdetun
- Kongsberg Skiing Museum
- Krøderen Line

=== Finnmark ===
- Alta Museum
- Royal and Ancient Polar Bear Society
- Museum of Reconstruction
- Tirpitz Museum

=== Hedmark ===
- Hedmark Museum
- Norwegian Railway Museum
- Norwegian Motorhistorical Museum

=== Hordaland ===
- Alvøen
- Bergen Museum
- Bergenhus Fortress
- Bryggens Museum
- Buekorps Museum
- Coastal Museum in Øygarden
- Damsgård Manor
- Fjell Fortress
- Gamlehaugen
- Hanseatic Museum and Schøtstuene
- Hardanger Fartøyvernsenter
- Hardanger Folkemuseum
- Hardangervidda Natursenter
- Lydgalleriet
- Norwegian Fisheries Museum
- Norwegian Museum of Hydropower and Industry
- Old Voss Line
- Ole Bull Museum Lysøen
- Sunnhordland Museum
- Troldhaugen
- Ryvarden Lighthouse
- Voss Folkemuseum
- Western Norway Emigration Center

=== Møre og Romsdal ===
- Jugendstilsenteret
- Nordmøre Museum
- Romsdal Museum
- Ytste Skotet

=== Nord-Trøndelag ===
- Hegra Fortress
- Norwegian Sawmill Museum

=== Nordland ===
- Knut Hamsun Centre
- Lofoten Stockfish Museum
- Lofotr Viking Museum
- Norwegian Fishing Village Museum
- Salten Museum

=== Oppland ===
- Aulestad
- Bagn Bygdesamling
- Bautahaugen Samlinger
- Fieldfare Cabin
- Hadeland Folkemuseum
- Hol Bygdemuseum
- Lands Museum
- Lillehammer Art Museum
- Maihaugen
- Norwegian Olympic Museum
- Valdres Folkemuseum

=== Oslo ===
- Armed Forces Museum (Norway)
- Astrup Fearnley Museum of Modern Art
- University Botanical Garden (Oslo)
- Museum of Cultural History, Oslo
- Fram Museum
- Galleri Rom
- Holmenkollen Ski Museum
- Høstutstillingen
- Norwegian Center for Studies of Holocaust and Religious Minorities
- Ibsen Museum (Oslo)
- Jewish Museum in Oslo
- Kon-Tiki Museum
- Munch Museum
- National Museum of Art, Architecture and Design
  - National Gallery of Norway
  - Norwegian Museum of Contemporary Art
  - Norwegian Museum of Decorative Arts and Design
- Natural History Museum at the University of Oslo
- Nobel Peace Center
- Nordic Bible Museum
- Norway's Resistance Museum
- Norwegian Maritime Museum (includes the Norwegian Folk Museum)
- Norwegian Museum of Cultural History
- Norwegian Museum of Science and Technology
- Oscarshall
- Oslo City Museum
- Oslo Police Museum
- Oslo Tramway Museum
- Paleontologisk Museum
- Stenersen Museum
- Vigeland Museum
- Viking Ship Museum (Oslo)

=== Rogaland ===
- Flyhistorisk Museum, Sola
- Garborg Centre
- Karmsund Folkemuseum
- Norwegian Petroleum Museum
- The Science Factory
- Stavanger Museum
- Tungenes Lighthouse

=== Sogn og Fjordane ===
- Anders Svor Museum
- Astruptunet
- Breheimsenteret
- The Heiberg Collections
- Jostedalsbreen nasjonalparksenter
- Nordfjord Folkemuseum
- Norwegian Glacier Museum
- Norwegian Museum of Travel and Tourism
- Sunnfjord Museum
- Sagastad

=== Sør-Trøndelag ===
- Austrått
- Museene i Sør-Trøndelag
- NTNU Museum of Natural History and Archaeology
- Norsk Døvemuseum
- Orkla Industrimuseum
  - Thamshavn Line
- Ringve Museum
- Sverresborg
- The Norwegian National Museum of Justice
- Trondheim Science Museum
- Trondheim Tramway Museum

=== Telemark ===
- Heddal Open Air Museum
- Norwegian Industrial Workers Museum
- Telemark Museum

=== Troms ===
- Arctic-alpine Botanic Garden
- Northern Norway Art Museum
- Polaria
- Tromsø University Museum
- Trondenes Historical Center

=== Vest-Agder ===
- Agder Natural History Museum and Botanical Garden
- Kristiansand Cannon Museum
- Lindesnes Lighthouse
- Setesdal Line
- Sørlandets Art Museum
- Vest-Agder Museum Kristiansand

=== Vestfold ===
- Eidsfos Verk
- Holmestrand Aluminium Museum
- Preus Museum
- no:Midgard historik senter
- Royal Norwegian Navy Museum
- Sandefjord Museum
- Southern Actor

=== Østfold ===
- Borgarsyssel Museum
- Elingård

== See also ==
- List of museums
- List of museums in Svalbard
- Tourism in Norway
- Culture of Norway
