= Martin Aagaard =

Norwegian painter

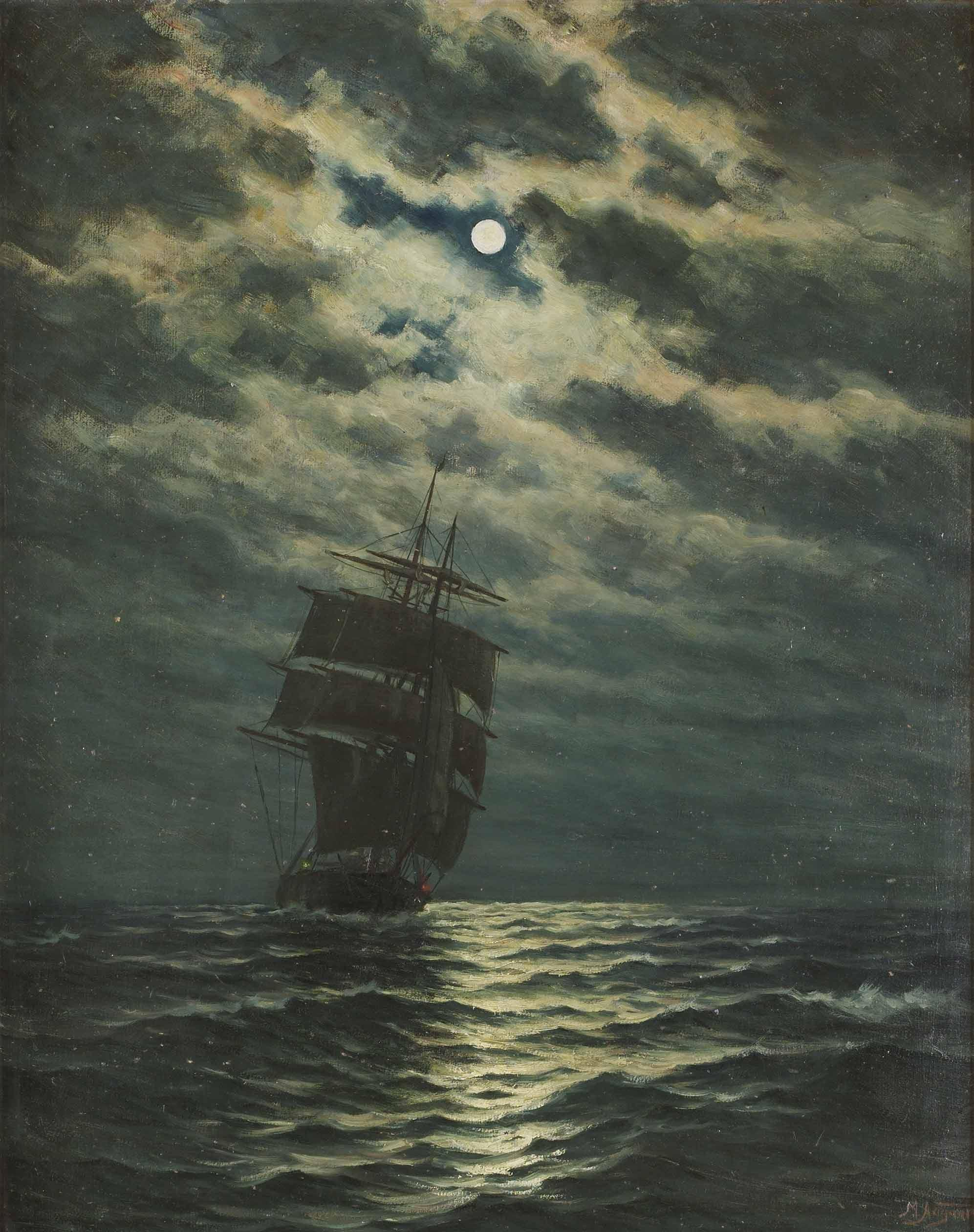
Skips i måneskinn

Zacharias Martin Aagaard (13 October 1863 – 6 December 1913) was a Norwegian painter who specialized in marine painting.

== Early life ==
Zackarias Martini Aagaard was born in Levanger Municipality in Nordre Trondheim county, Norway. He was educated at Trondheim Technical School and the Royal Drawing School (now Norwegian National Academy of Craft and Art Industry) in Oslo. He was a student of Harriet Backer and Knud Bergslien, and he apprenticed for a time with Christian Krohg. He spent time researching locations in Lofoten and Finnmark.

He exhibited his works from 1898 in Bergen. He exhibited at the Exposition Universelle (1900). Several of his paintings were executed in large dimensions. In 1909, Aagaard was in Trondheim, where he painted a large painting from the harbor featuring pleasure crafts. His work is on public display at the Bergen Maritime Museum, Nordmøre Museum, and Trondheim Maritime Museum among other locations.

He died during 1913 at Kristiania, Norway

== Works ==
In recent years, Aagaard's work has sold at auction between US$438 for 'Ångare', and US$11,929 for 'Norske Båter Langs Kysten'.

== Gallery ==
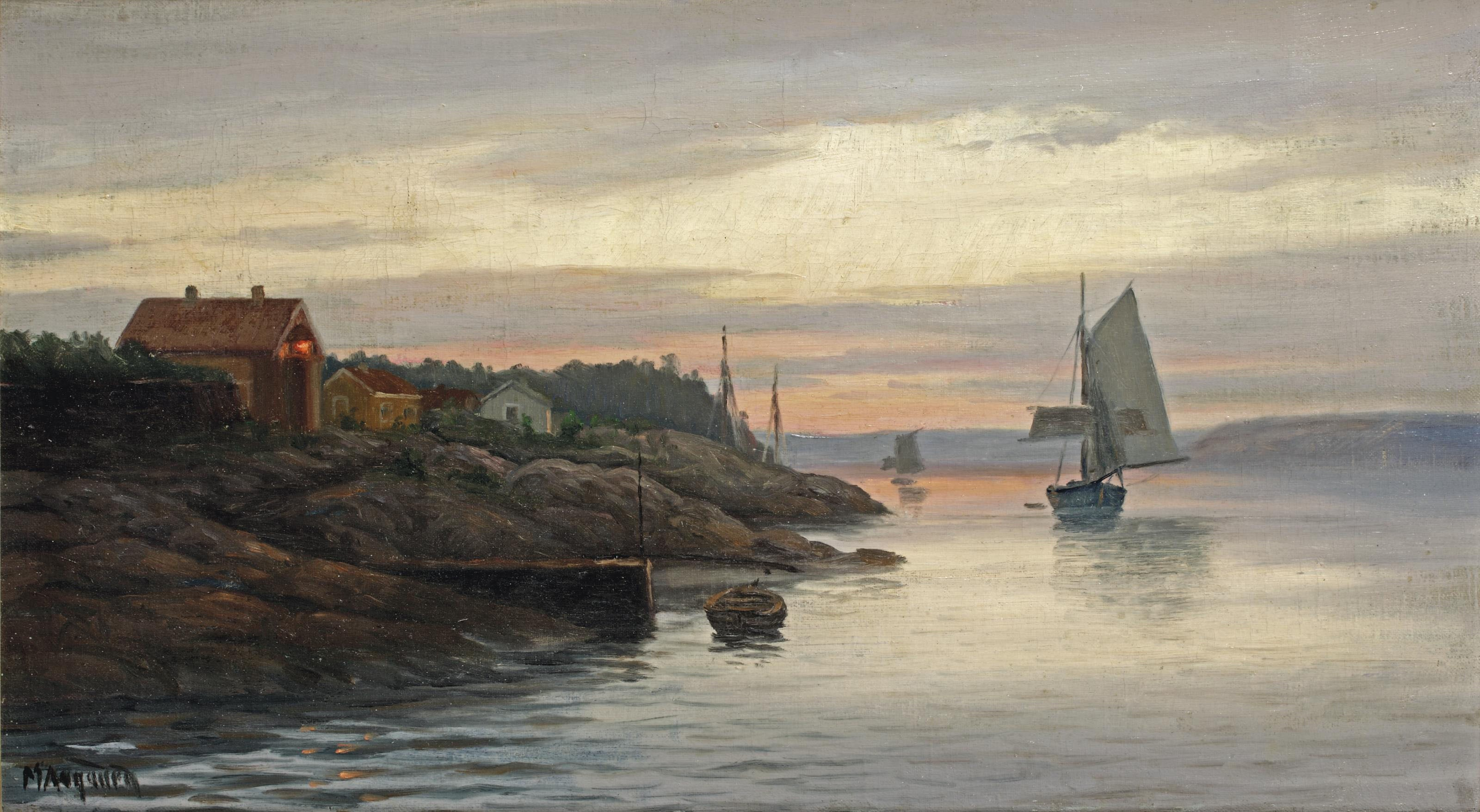
Umbes (1880)

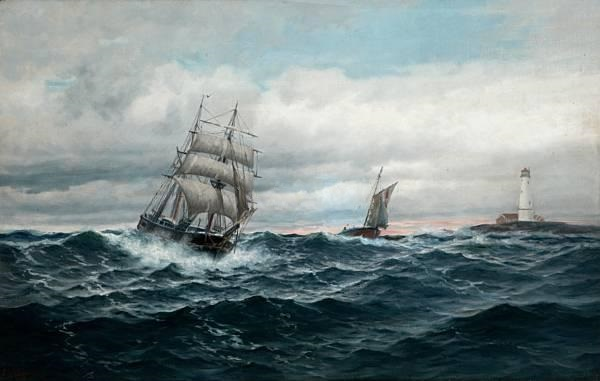
For fulle seil

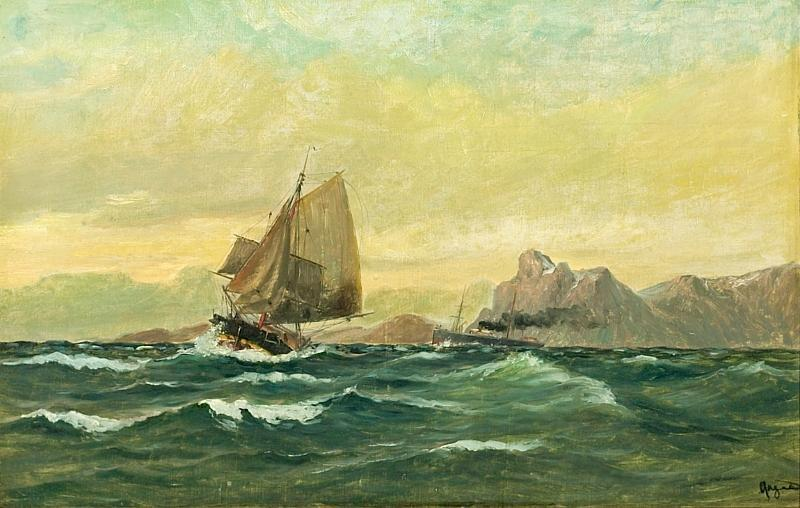
Sjølandskap med fjellformasjoner

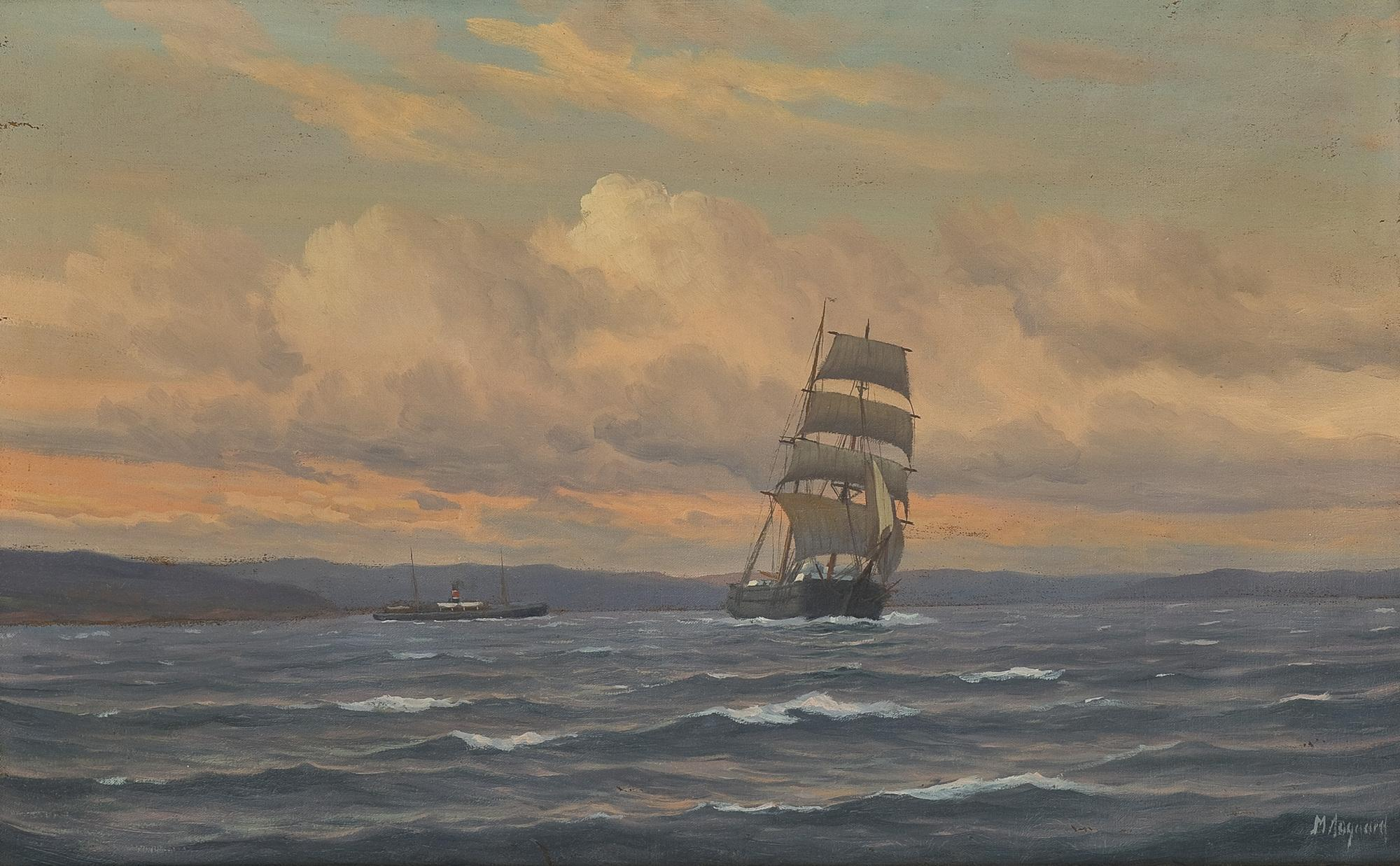
Seilskute Og Dampskip (1886)

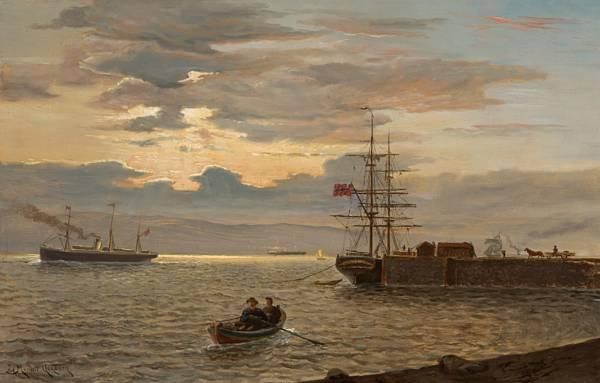
Tyskerbryggen i Bergen (1886)

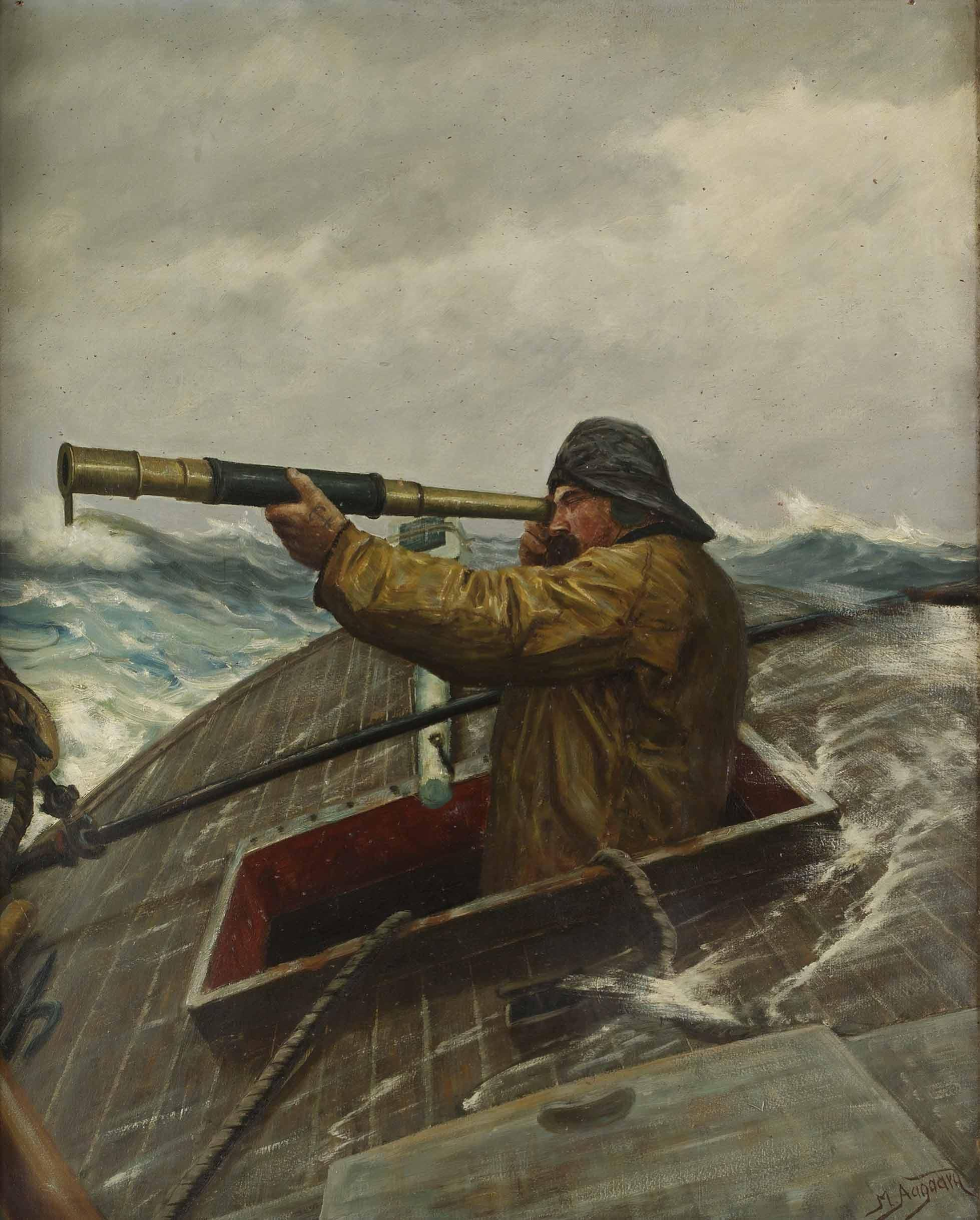
Sailor med kikkert

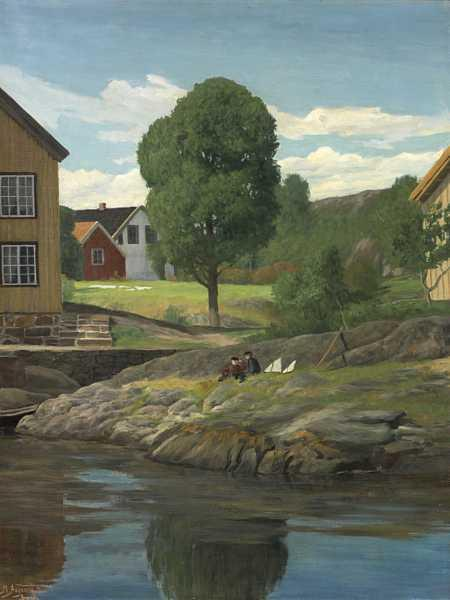
Borøen (1900)
