= Tourism in Norway =

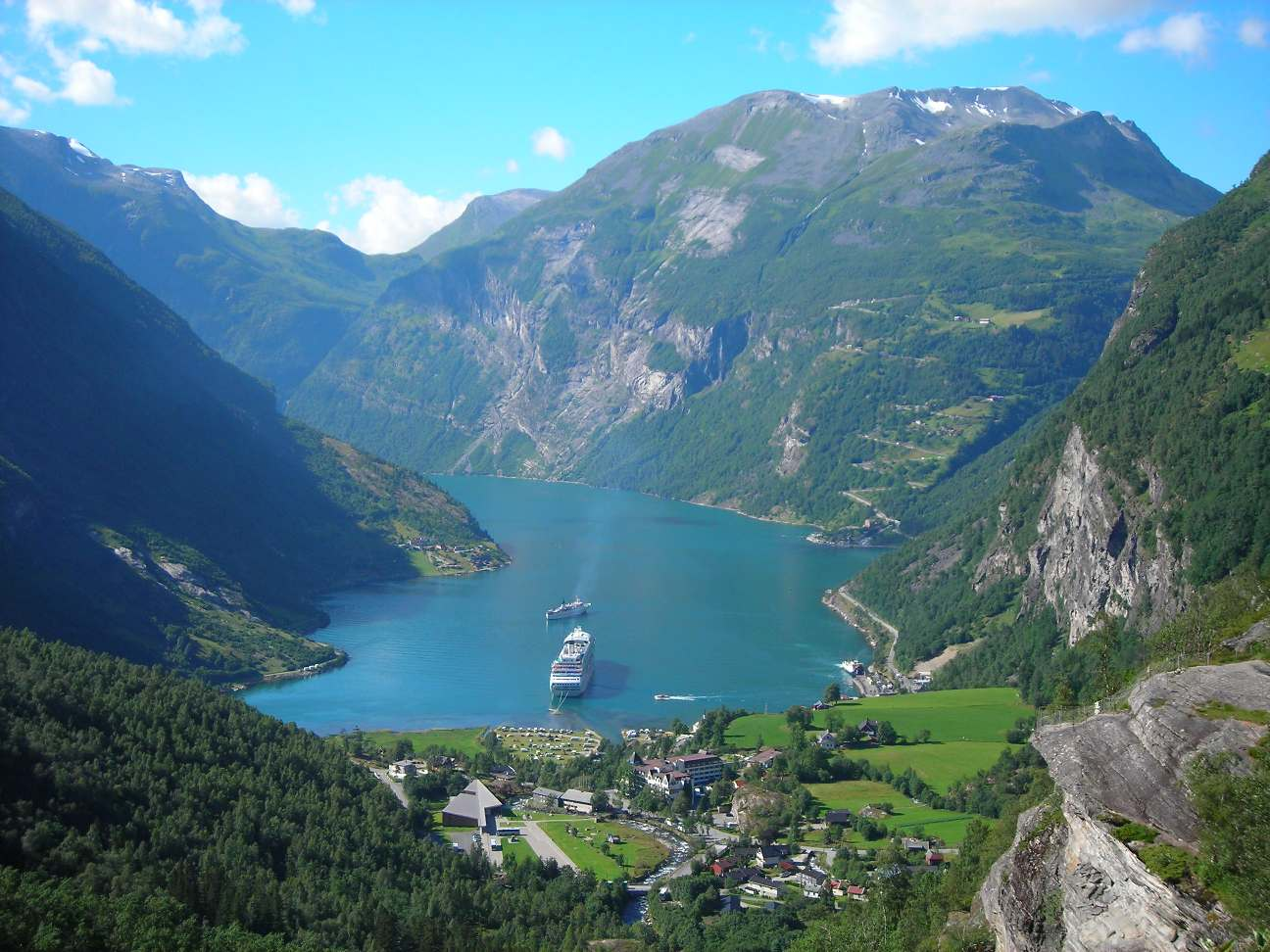
The Geirangerfjord in Møre og Romsdal, since 2005 on UNESCO's list of World Heritage Sites.

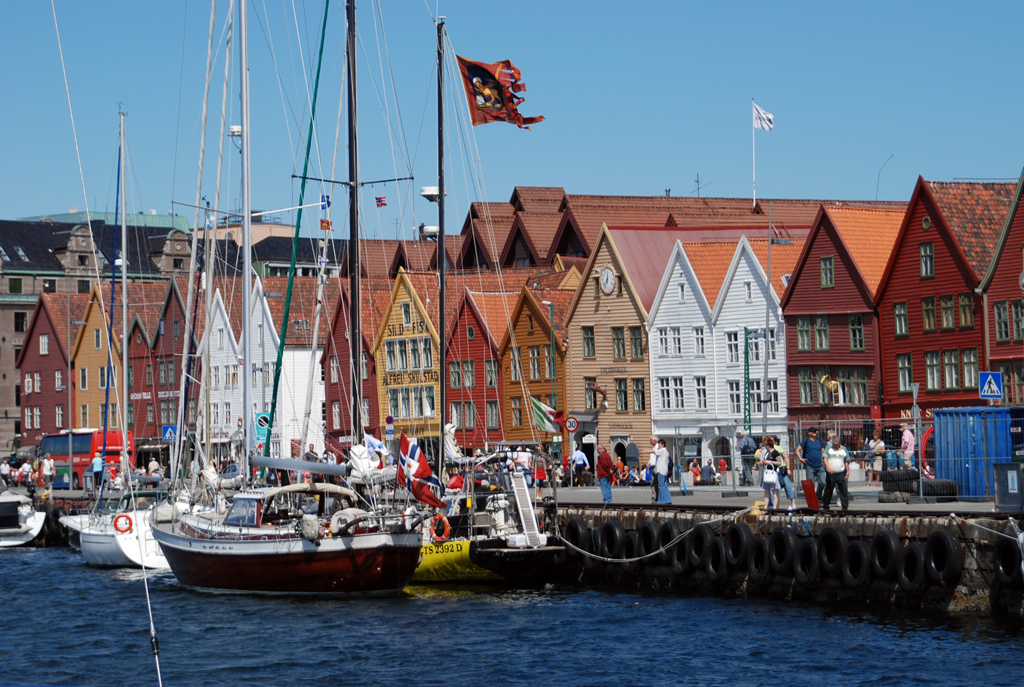
The historical quarter of Bryggen in Bergen.

As of 2019, Norway ranks 22nd in the World Economic Forum's Travel and Tourism Competitiveness Report. Tourism in Norway contributed 4.2% of the gross domestic product as reported in 2018. Every seven in a hundred people throughout the country work in the tourism industry. Tourism is seasonal in Norway, with more than half of total tourists visiting between the months of May and August.

== Attractions ==
The main attractions of Norway are the varied landscapes that extend across the Arctic Circle. It is famous for its fjord-indented coastline and its mountains, ski resorts, lakes and woods. Popular tourist destinations in Norway include Oslo, Ålesund, Bergen, Stavanger, Trondheim, Kristiansand, Nordfjordeid, Arendal, Tromsø, Geiranger, Flåm, Fredrikstad and Tønsberg. Much of the nature of Norway remains unspoiled, and thus attracts numerous hikers and skiers. Pulpit Rock and Trolltunga are among the most popular selfie locations in the mountains.

The fjords, mountains and waterfalls in Western and Northern Norway attract several hundred thousand foreign tourists each year. In the cities, sights such as the Holmenkollen ski jump in Oslo and Saga Oseberg in Tønsberg attract many visitors, as do the Hanseatic Bryggen area in Bergen, the Vigeland Sculpture Park in Oslo, The Nidaros Cathedral in Trondheim, Fredrikstad Fortress (Gamlebyen) in Fredrikstad, the ruin park of Tønsberg Fortress in Tønsberg and numerous others.

The culture of Norway evolved as a result of its sparse population, harsh climate, and relative isolation from the rest of Europe. It is therefore distinct from other countries in Europe in that it has fewer opulent palaces and castles, smaller agricultural areas, and longer travel distances. Regionally distinct architecture, crafts, and art are presented in the various folk museums, typically based on an ethnological perspective. Norsk Folkemuseum at Bygdøy in Oslo is the largest of these.

== Weather ==
Norway is often associated with weather similar to Alaska or Siberia, primarily because the country shares the same latitude as them. In reality, while it is often cold in Norway, the weather is often milder than might be expected, due to the Gulf Stream and warm air currents. Away from the coast, winters are colder, with more snow, and summers are mild with little to no humidity.

== Transport ==
The Norwegian highway system covers more than 90,000 kilometres, of which about 67,000 are paved. The highway system includes ferry transit across waterways, numerous bridges and tunnels, and several mountain passes. Some of these mountain passes are closed during the winter months, and some may close during winter storms. With the opening of the Oresund Bridge and the Great Belt Fixed Link, Norway is connected to the European continent by a continuous highway connection through Sweden and Denmark.

The 4,058 kilometres long rail network connects most of the major cities south of Bodø. The Norwegian rail network is also connected to the Swedish network. Oslo Airport, Gardermoen is the most important airport in Norway, with 24 million passengers in 2014. Most cities and towns have nearby airports, and some of the largest also have international flights. The cruise ferry Hurtigruten connects the cities on the coast between Bergen and Kirkenes. In the summer, the coastal cities are visited by numerous foreign cruise ships, Bergen being the main cruise port.

== Statistics ==
Tourist arrivals of 2024 in %

In 2015, 8,828,771 foreign tourists visited Norway, an 8.3% increase over the previous year's figure of 8,154,436.

The top ten countries of origin of tourists visiting Norway were:

Rank	Country	2014	2015
1	Germany	1,388,978	1,459,908
2	Sweden	1,040,168	1,097,231
3	Denmark	741,241	749,517
4	United Kingdom	614,876	704,508
5	The Netherlands	539,733	567,343
6	United States	397,801	425,295
7	France	301,889	326,866
8	China	176,767	287,153
9	Spain	200,441	253,590
10	Italy	191,390	196,785
Total international visitors		8,154,436	8,828,771

== Most visited tourist attractions ==
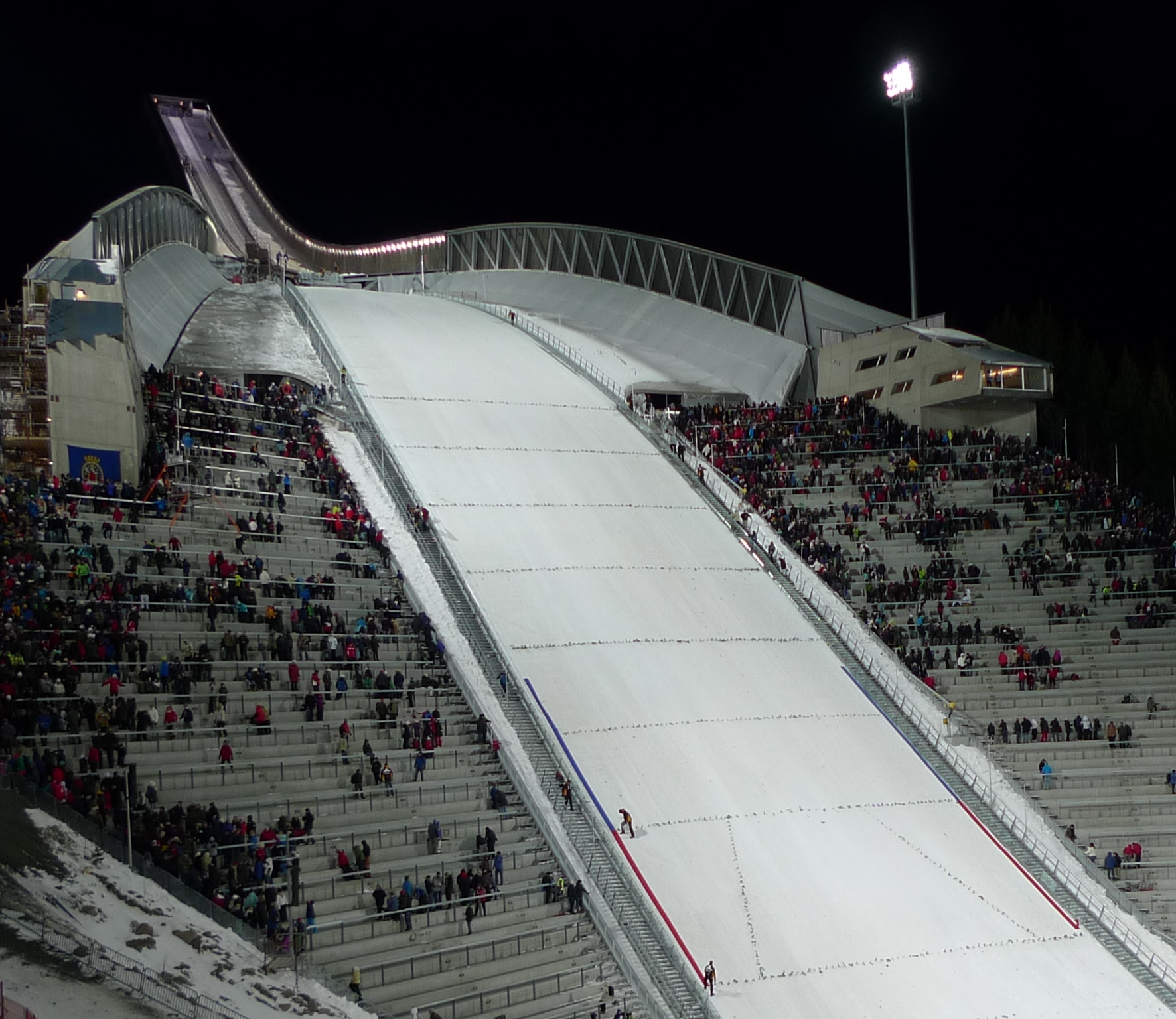
The Holmenkollen ski jump in Oslo

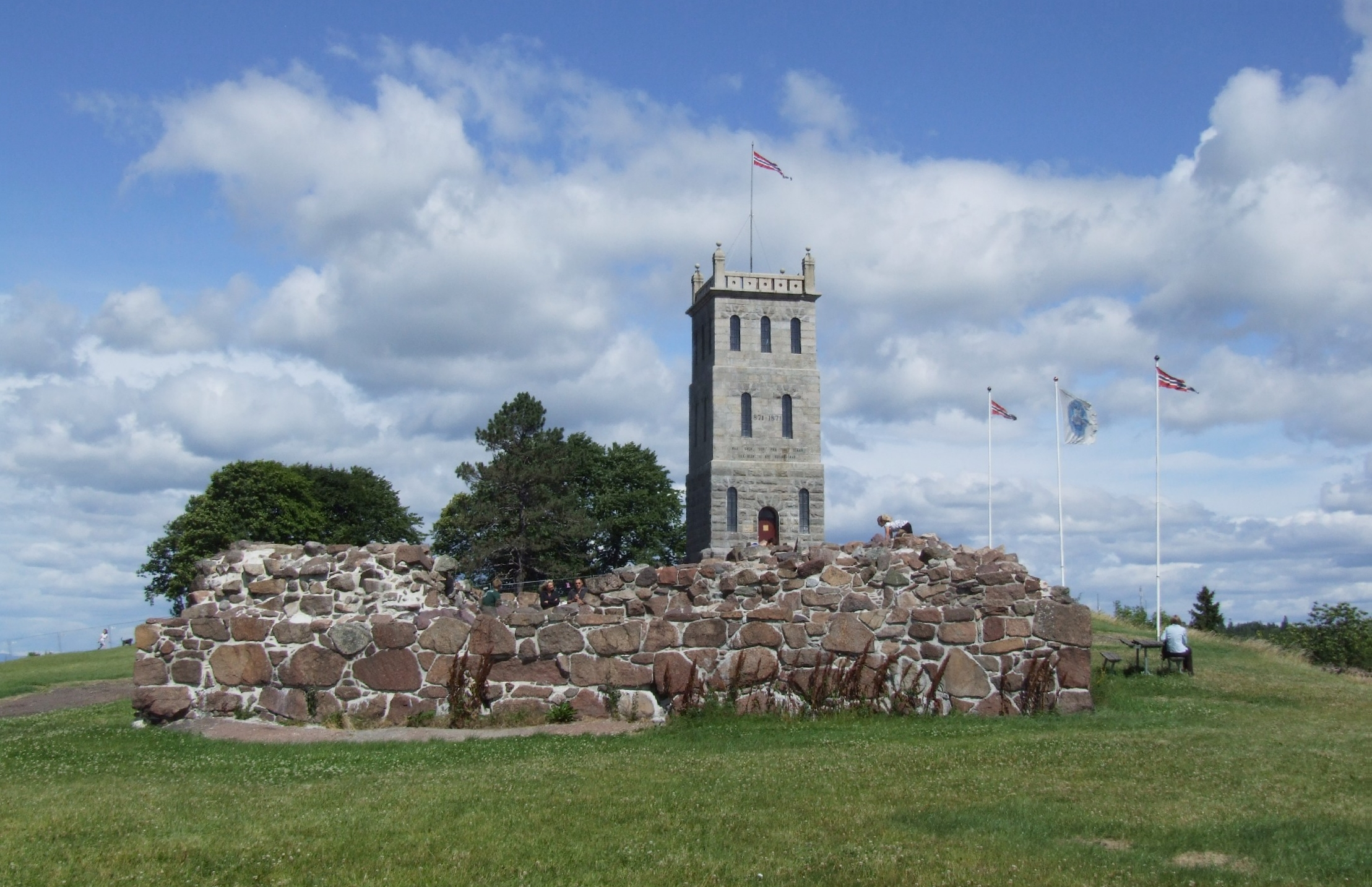
Ruins of the Tønsberg Fortress in Tønsberg with the famous Slottsfjell Tower in the background

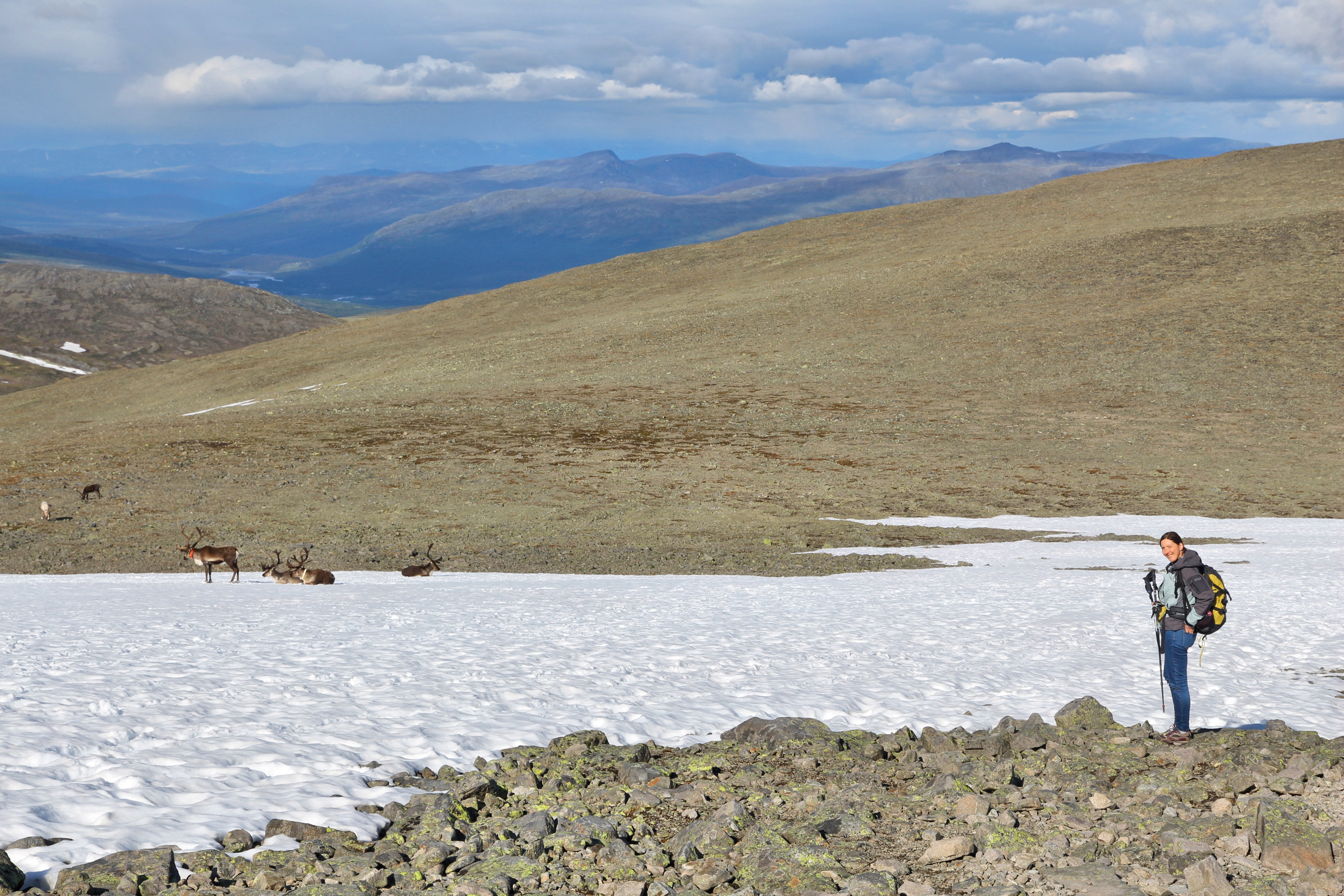
Tourist observes reindeer next to Besseggen trail in Jotunheimen National Park.

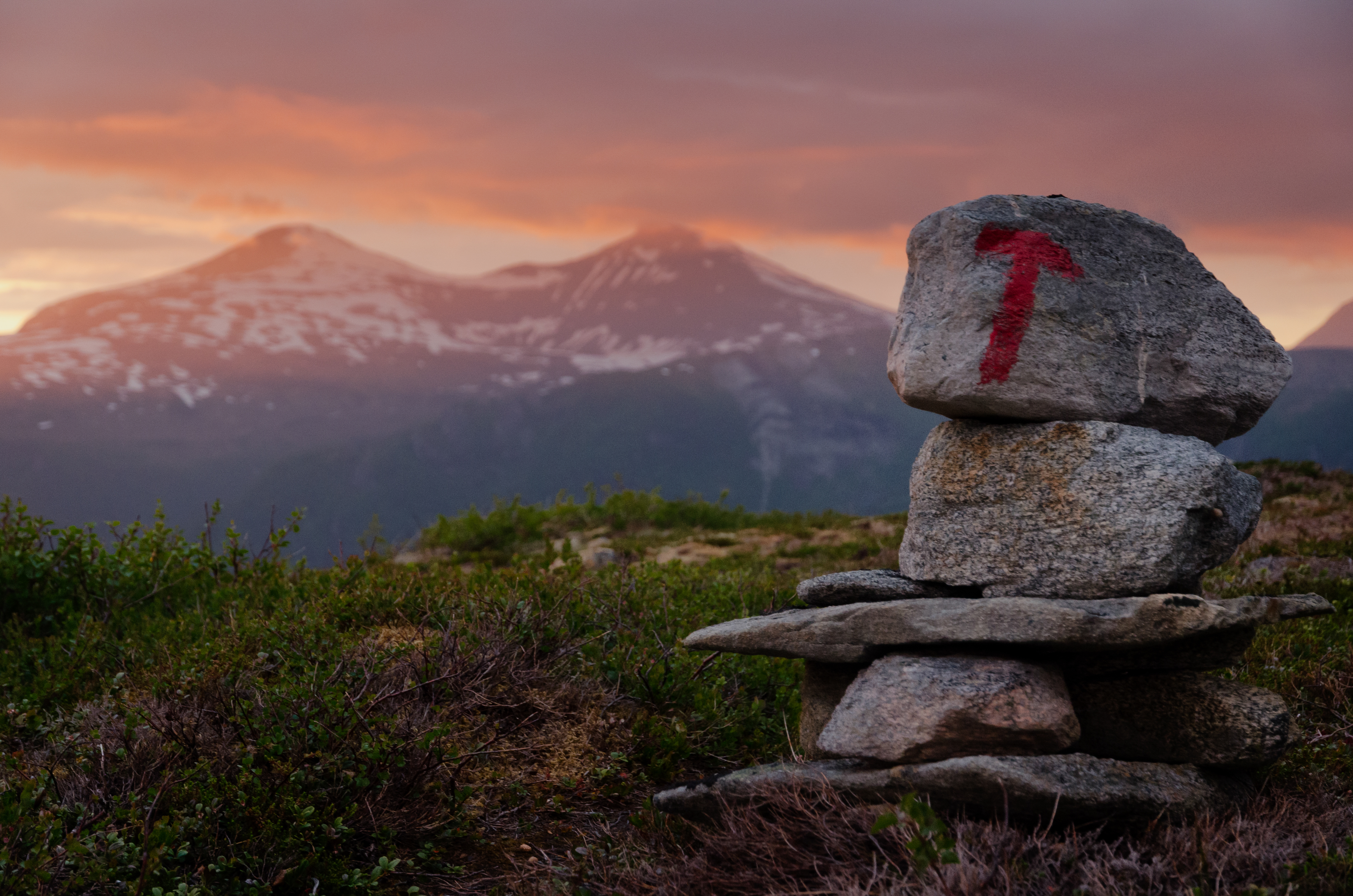
Norwegian trail marking, Trollheimen

Innovation Norway, a state-owned promotion company which is also in charge of tourism affairs, publishes annual reports on the country's most visited tourist attractions, both cultural and natural. The 2007 report lists 50 cultural and 20 natural attractions.

Cultural attractions
Rank	Attraction	Type	Location	Visitors, 2007
1	Fløibanen	Railway	Bergen	1,131,707
2	Holmenkollbakken and Ski Museum	Ski jumping hill	Oslo	686,857
3	Bryggen	Heritage wharf	Bergen	583,510
4	Kristiansand Zoo and Amusement Park	Amusement park	Kristiansand	532,044
5	Tusenfryd	Amusement park	Ås	501,235
6	Flåm Line	Railway	Flåm	457,545
7	Hadeland Glassverk	Glass works	Jevnaker	431,400
8	Fredrikstad Fortress, Old Town of Fredrikstad	Heritage fortress and town	Fredrikstad	372,360
9	Viking Ship Museum	Museum	Oslo	314,560
10	Hunderfossen Familiepark	Amusement park	Øyer Municipality - Lillehammer Municipality	270,500

Natural attractions
Rank	Attraction	Type	Location	Visitors, 2006
1	Vøringsfossen	Waterfall	Eidfjord	655,000
2	Trollstigen	Road	Åndalsnes	563,331
3	Kjosfossen	Waterfall	Flåm	457,400
4	Geirangerfjorden	Fjord	Geiranger	423,643
5	Låtefossen	Waterfall	Odda, Hardanger	420,000
6	Steinsdalsfossen	Waterfall	Norheimsund, Hardanger	300,000
7	Nærøyfjorden	Fjord	Aurland	297,038
8	Briksdalsbreen	Glacier	Olden, Stryn	280,000
9	Sognefjellsvegen	Road	Lom and Luster	253,953
10	Atlantic Ocean Road	Road		

Cruise ports in Norway
Rank	Port	Visitors, 2025	Calls, 2025
1	Bergen	683,718	346
2	Stavanger	638,751	244
3	Ålesund	594,510	281
4	Kristiansand	426,355	163
5	Geiranger	408,665	149
6	Oslo	401,669	173
7	Haugesund	401,377	130
8	Flåm	345,510	114
9	Olden	295,911	116
10	Nordfjordeid	228,747	80

== Tourism exhibitions ==
In January 2009, the National Building Museum presented the exhibition Detour: Architecture and Design along 18 National Tourist Routes in Norway. The exhibition, which was created in collaboration with the Norwegian Embassy, was available for view until May 2009.

== See also ==
- National Tourist Routes in Norway
- World Heritage Sites in Norway
- Norwegian Mountain Touring Association
- List of botanical gardens in Norway
- List of castles in Norway
- List of cathedrals in Norway
- List of forts in Norway
- List of museums in Norway
- List of national parks of Norway
- List of Norwegian fjords
- Scandinavian Mountains Airport
- Tourism in Denmark
- Tourism in Finland
- Tourism in Sweden
- Tourism in Iceland
