= Tungenes Lighthouse =

Coastal lighthouse in Norway

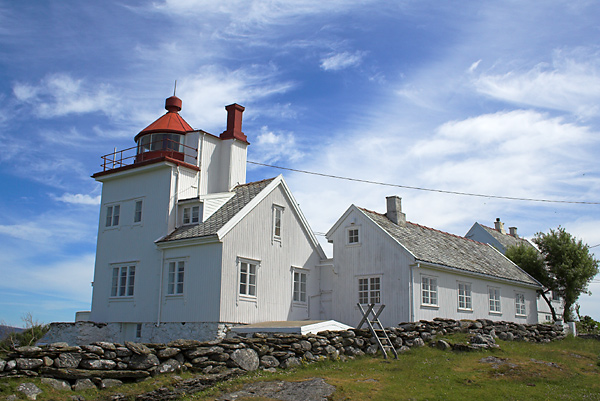
- View of the Tungenes Lighthouse
- Location: Rogaland, Norway
- Coordinates: 59°02′09″N 5°34′52″E

Tower
- Constructed: 1828
- Height: 12 m (39 ft)
- Shape: Square
- Markings: White with red roof
- Heritage: cultural property

Light
- Deactivated: 1984
- Lens: 4th order Fresnel lens
- Intensity: 13,400 Candela
- Range: 13.8 nmi (25.6 km; 15.9 mi)

Tungenes Lighthouse (Norwegian: Tungenes fyr) is a coastal lighthouse located in Randaberg Municipality in Rogaland county, Norway. The lighthouse is situated at the north end of the Tungenes headland on the tip of Stavanger Peninsula just to the north of the city of Stavanger. The lighthouse is no longer in use, but it is used as a fine arts center and lighthouse/maritime museum. There is also a cafe in one of the buildings. Historically, the lighthouse was the main light marking the entrance to the Byfjorden, the main fjord leading to the important city of Stavanger.

== History ==
Tungenes was first lit in 1828 at a time when the fishing and herring trade increased the need for a safer entrance to the harbor at Stavanger via the Byfjorden. Tungenes was decommissioned and closed down in 1984 and replaced by an automated beacon located just off shore on the tiny island of Brakjen. Tungenes is now a protected site affiliated with the Norwegian Lighthouse History Association (Norsk Fyrhistorisk Forening). It currently operates as a museum and cultural center in cooperation with Jærmuseet.

Jærmuseet, which is headquartered in Nærbø, is also responsible for running several other local museum facilities in various parts of the district of Jæren. Jærmuseet is the regional science museum for the municipalities of Randaberg, Sola, Sandnes, Gjesdal, Klepp, Time and Hå.

== See also ==
- Garborg Centre
- The Science Factory
- Flyhistorisk Museum, Sola
- Lighthouses in Norway
- List of lighthouses in Norway
