= Garborg Centre =

Educational centre in Bryne, Rogaland, Norway

Coordinates: 58.7338°N 5.6506°E

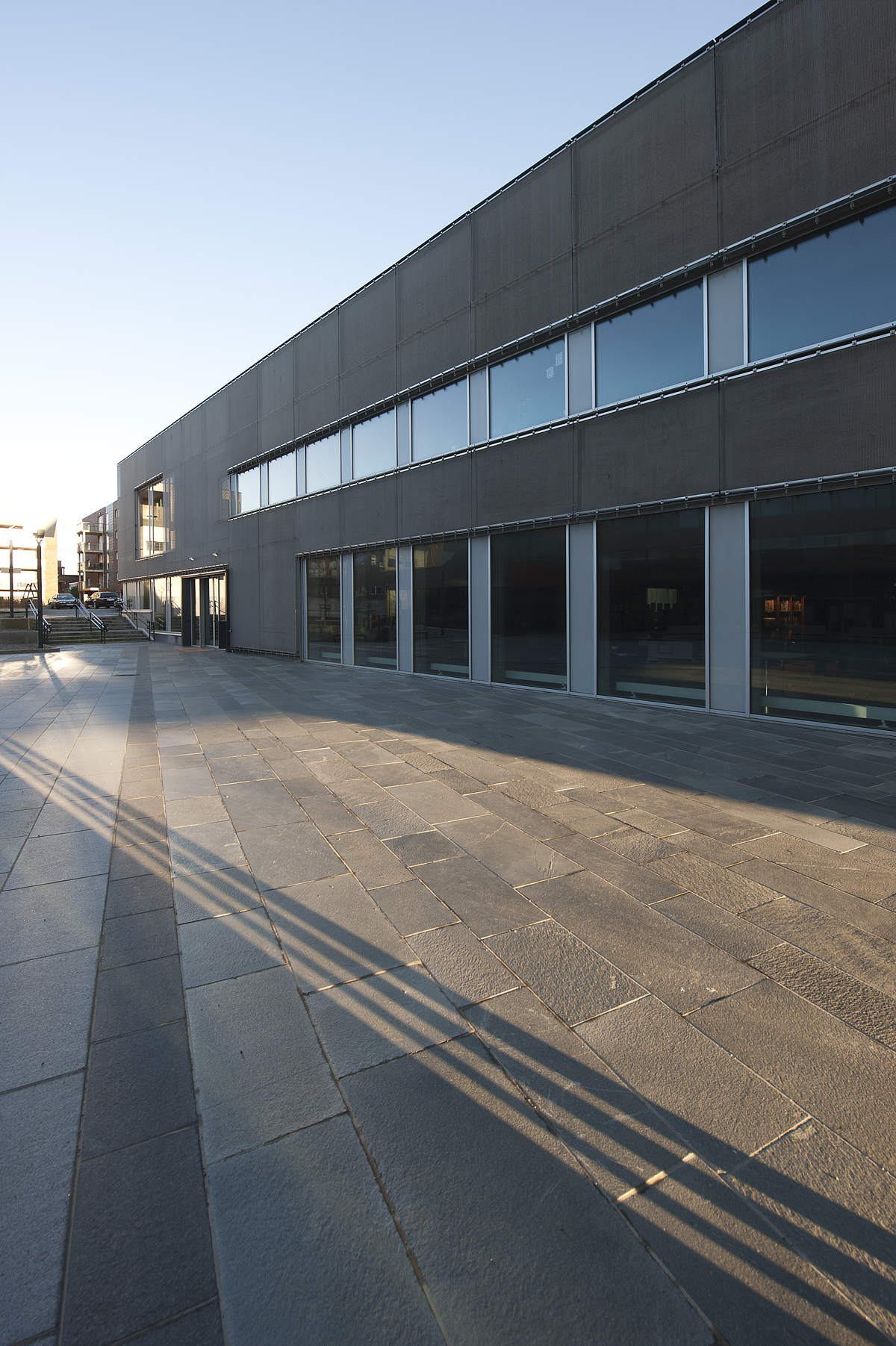
Garborg Centre viewed from Forum Jæren

The Garborg Centre (Norwegian: Nasjonalt Garborgsenter) is an educational centre dedicated to the husband and wife authors, Arne Garborg and Hulda Garborg. It is situated near Arne Garborg's childhood home in the town of Bryne in Time Municipality, Rogaland county, Norway.

The centre aims to encourage people’s interest for the ideas and visions of the two important authors and members of society in Norwegian history. The centre will also encourage visitors to take a more active part in today’s society, and inspire them to read and develop their own creativity. It contains a roleplay, titled Strid about conflicts regarding language, identity and democracy. The center opened September 5, 2012.

Garborg Centre is operated in cooperation with Jærmuseet, a museum organization aiming to inspire youth about science, technology and culture. Jærmuseet, which is headquartered in Nærbø, is also responsible for running several other local museum facilities in various parts of the district of Jæren. Jærmuseet is the regional science museum for the municipalities of Randaberg, Sola, Sandnes, Gjesdal, Klepp, Time and Hå.

== See also ==
- The Science Factory
- Tungenes Lighthouse
- Flyhistorisk Museum, Sola
