= Forum Jæren =

Skyscraper in Bryne, Norway

Coordinates: 58°44′2.58″N 5°38′59.76″E

Forum Jæren is a 65,5 meters (67,7 meters at the very top) high skyscraper in the city of Bryne, Norway. The tower has 20 floors and contains offices, meeting rooms, and restaurants. The base area of the tower is 400 square meters.

== Construction ==
The construction started 2 July 2007, and was finished on 10 November 2009, with opening the day after. The skyscraper was originally planned to be 64 meters high, but due to some uncalculated problems with an emergency elevator the buildings height was changed to 65.4 meters.

The construction cost is estimated to be around 250 million NOK.

== Future ==
There are plans to build a new library as well as the national Garborgsenteret, a building in memory of the famous Norwegian writers Arne Garborg and Hulda Garborg. These new buildings will be designed to fit with the highrise to make get a nice overall look of the complex. There is also planned a new high school in the area.
