= Dagali Museum =

Museum in Norway

Coordinates: 60°24′42″N 8°26′35″E

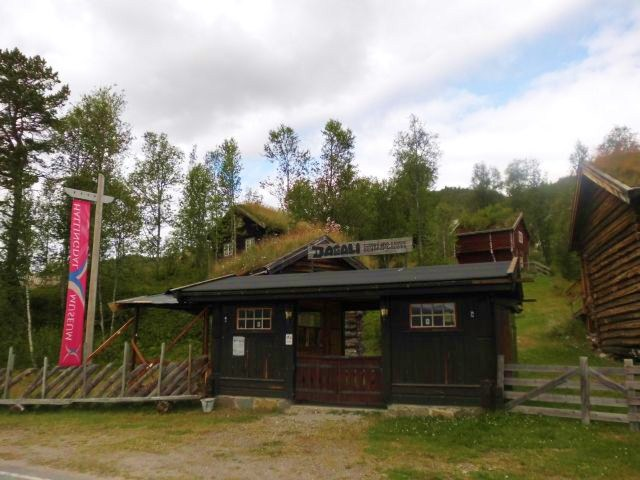
Entrance to the museum

Dagali Museum is a small local museum in Dagali, within the Hol municipality in Buskerud county, Norway. The museum is a subsidiary of the Hallingdal Museum.

Gunnar Steensen (1870-1970) initiated the collection of historic buildings now comprising the Dagali Museum before 1900. In 1947, he bequeathed to the village of Dagali, the museum buildings and artifacts from Dagali, Skurdal, Tunhovd and Uvdal. Altogether there are 10 buildings at the museum, representing the rural culture of the 18th and 19th century. Ølistugu and Gvølveli seters (mountain farms) are also included in the Dagali museum.
