= Hallingdal Museum =

Museum in Norway

Coordinates: 60°33′59″N 9°05′30″E

Hallingdal Museum Nesbyen (formerly Hallingdal Folkemuseum) is an open-air museum at Nesbyen in Buskerud county, Norway.

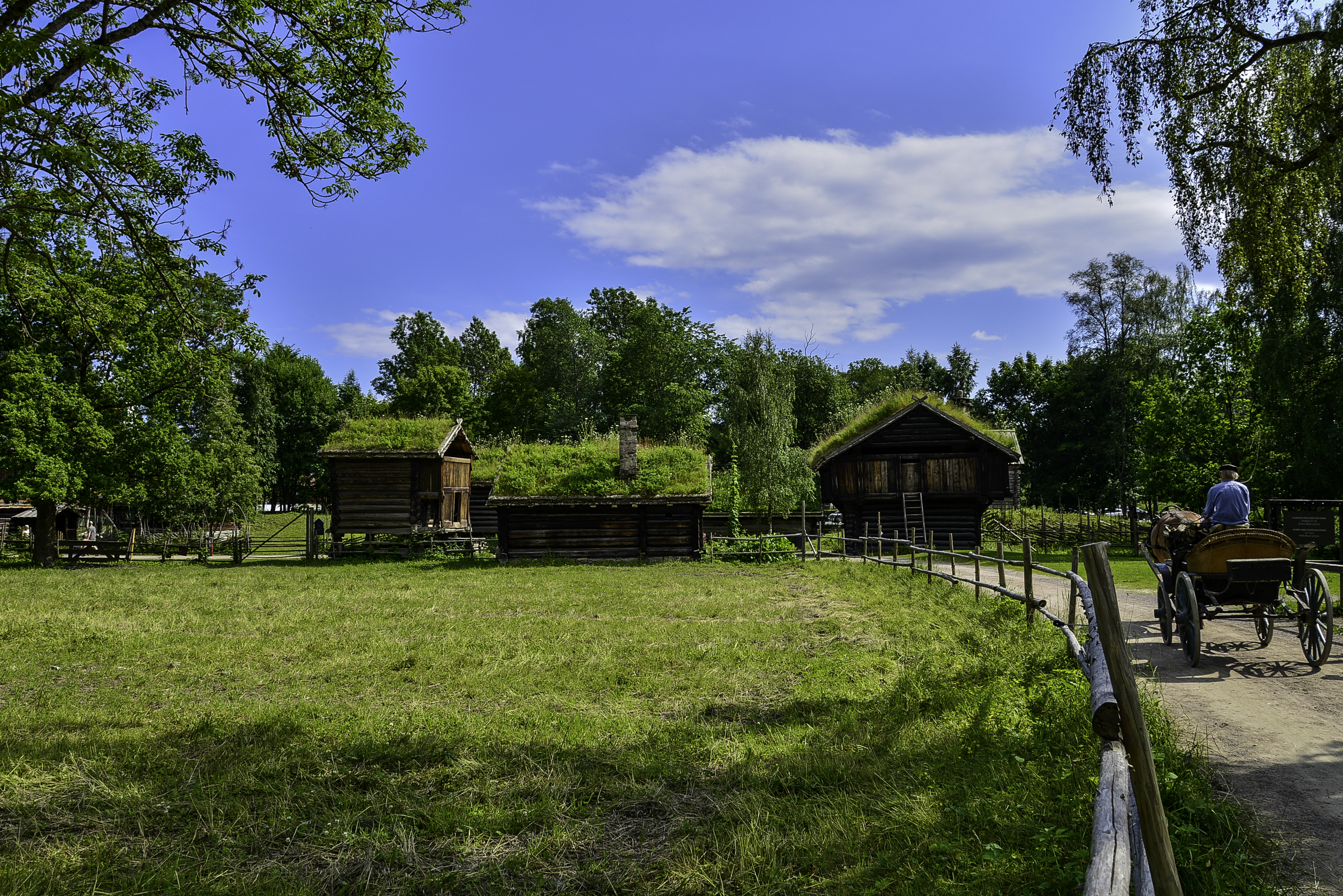
Hallingdal Museum

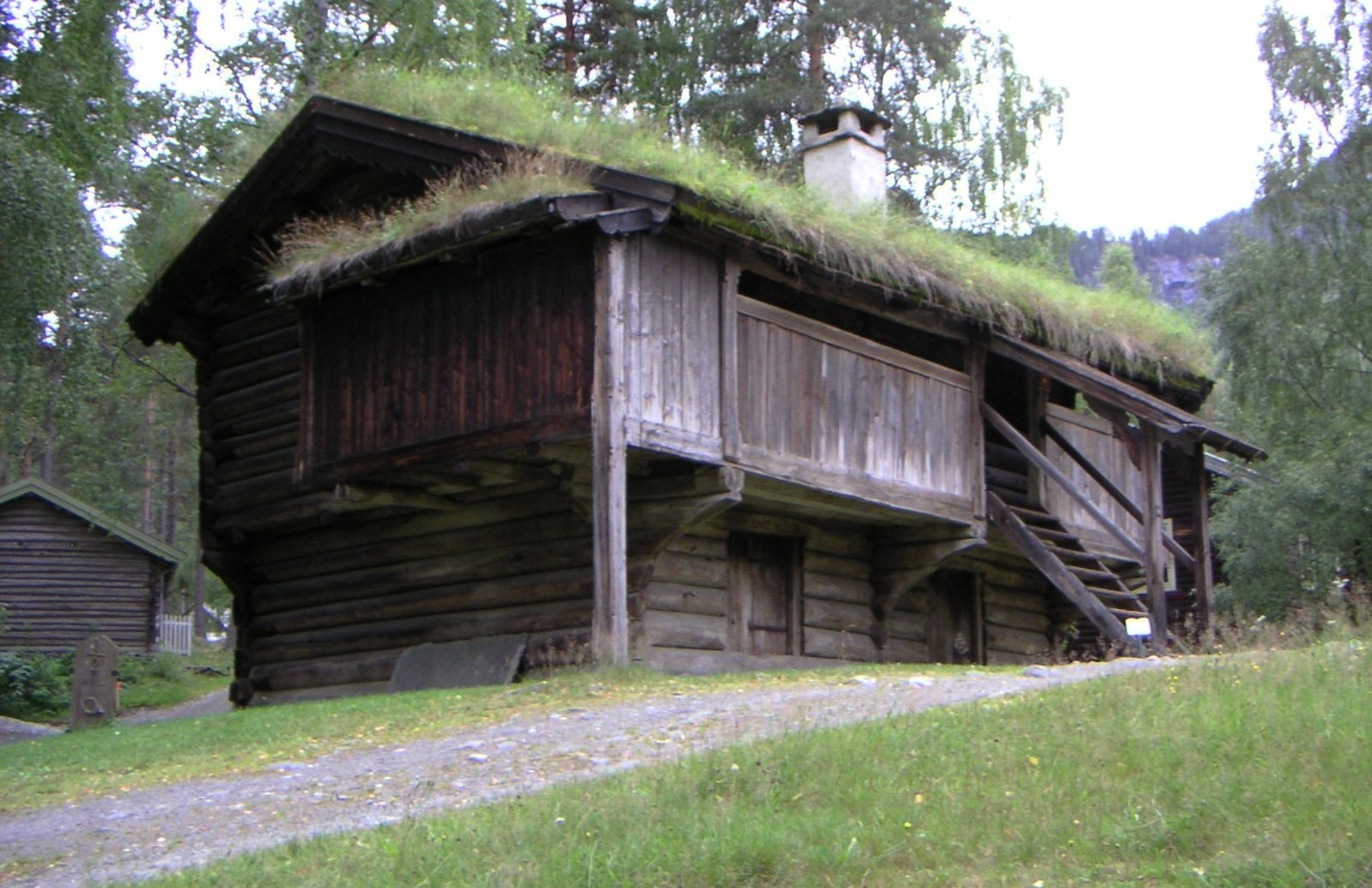
Trøymstugua at Hallingdal Museum

Hallingdal Folk Museum was founded in 1899. It is one of the oldest open-air museums in Norway. The museum has 30 historic buildings and some 30,000 artifacts from the region of Hallingdal.

The museum consists of several branches located in different municipalities: Dagali Museum (Hol municipality), Gol Bygdetun (Gol Municipality), Hemsedal Bygdetun (Hemsedal municipality), Hol Bygdemuseum (Hol municipality) and Ål Bygdamuseum (Al Municipality), as well as the former mountain farm Dokken Fjellgard at Sudndalen in Hol. All museum departments in Hallingdal have a main emphasis on the farm culture of the 17th and 19th century.
