= Bagn Bygdesamling =

Norwegian Museum

Coordinates: 60°48′17.07″N 9°33′48.96″E

Bagn Bydesamling is a small museum located in the hamlet of Dolven, south of Bagn at Sør-Aurdal Municipality in Innlandet county Norway. The museum is situated in the traditional district of Valdres and is run as a subsidiary of Valdres Folkemuseum.

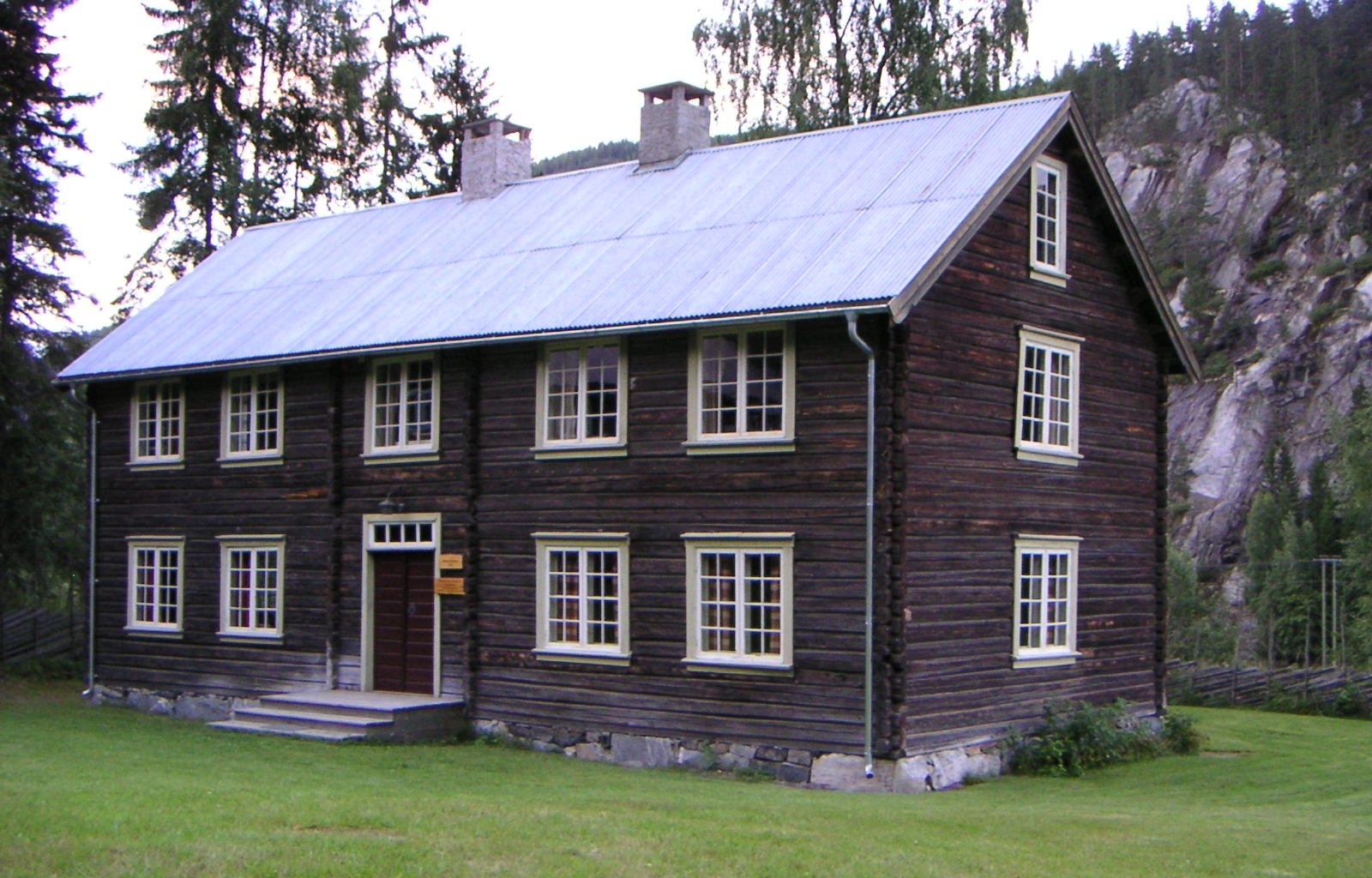
Prestgardsboligen parish priest residence from 1808

== History ==
The museum has displays at the small farms Sandviken and Bagnsbergatn. The last one is the site of a Norwegian World War II memorial location. All the items in the museum are original and have been collected from various farms and other locations in the area. The permanent display consists of artifacts from both the Stone Age and Iron Age, textiles and clothing, furniture and kitchen items, and artifacts from the occupation of Norway by Nazi Germany.

== Collection ==
- Telthuset — regimental arsenal for Ytre Valdreske Kompagni
- Prestgardsboligen — priest farm house
- Stabelbygningen — building for tenant farmer living in Perstgarden
- Seterbu — mountain farmhouse
- Oppgangssag — sawmill
- Bekkekvern (mølle) — watermill
- Stabbur— Storage houses
- Smie — iron works with blast furnace
- Koie (skogshusvære) — hut (forest shelter)
- Båtnaust — boathouse
- Badstue (korntørke) — sauna for corn drying

== Gallery ==
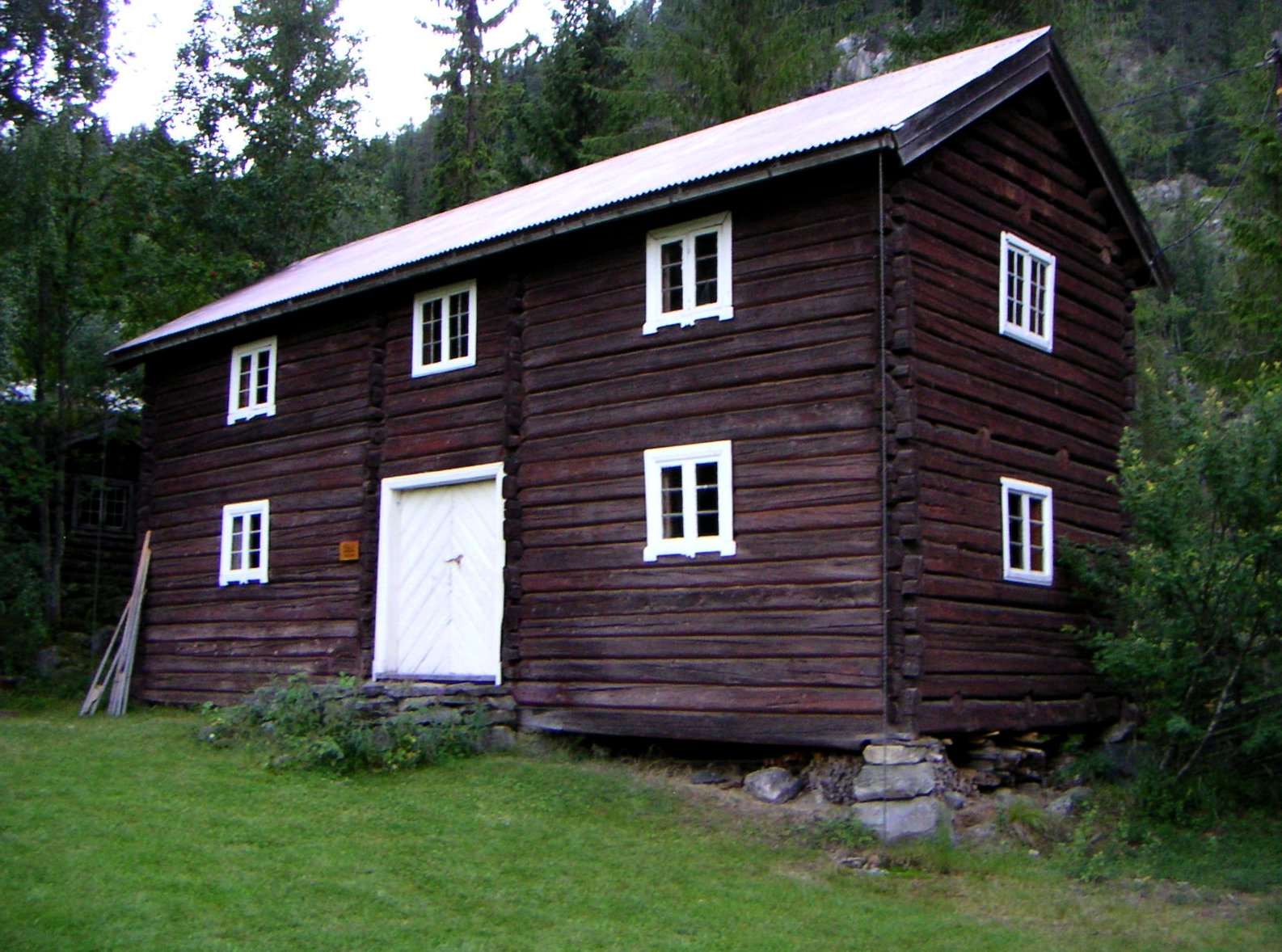
Telthuset, 1813 - 1850.

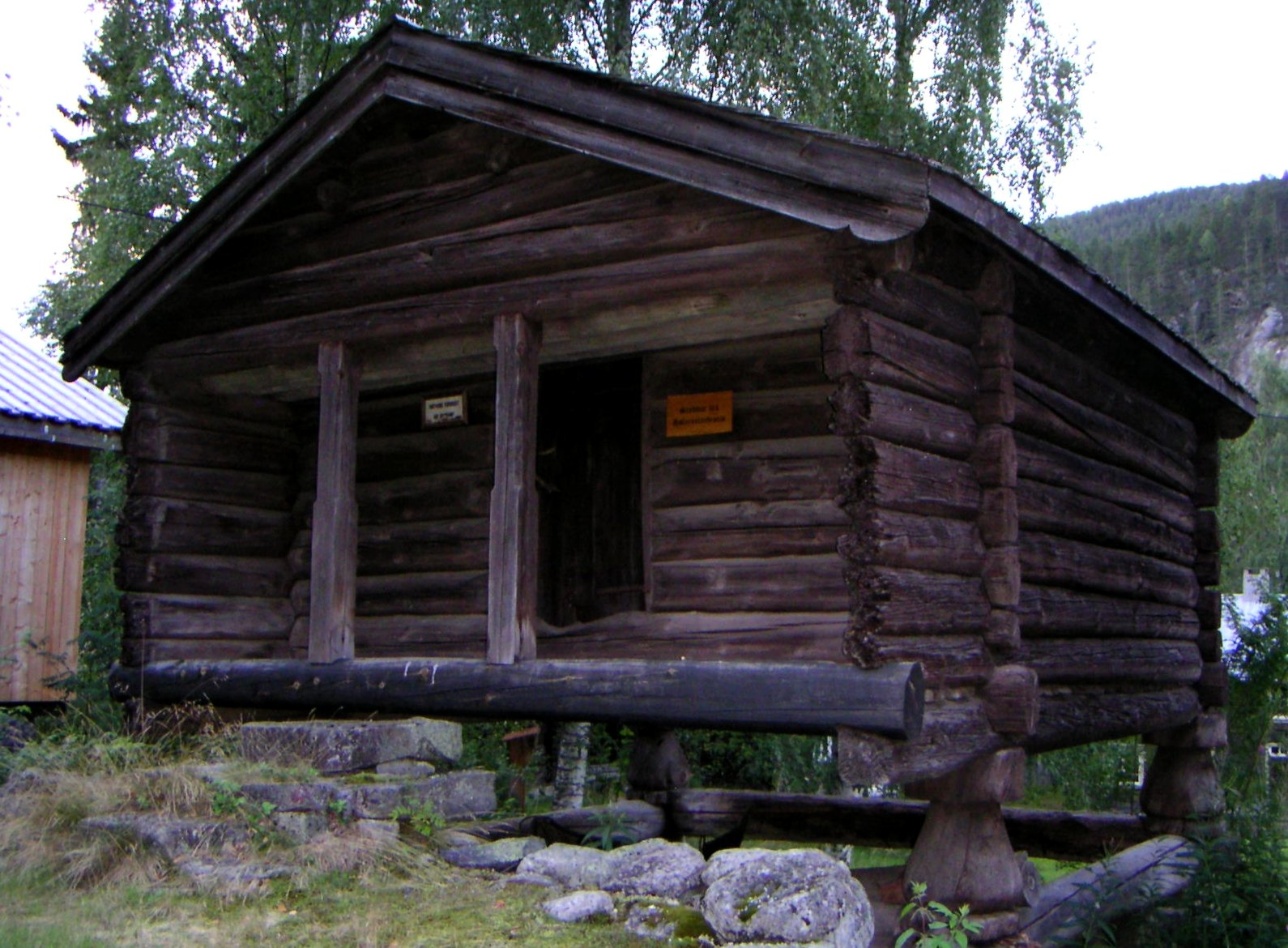
Stabbur Hølerseterbrøtin.

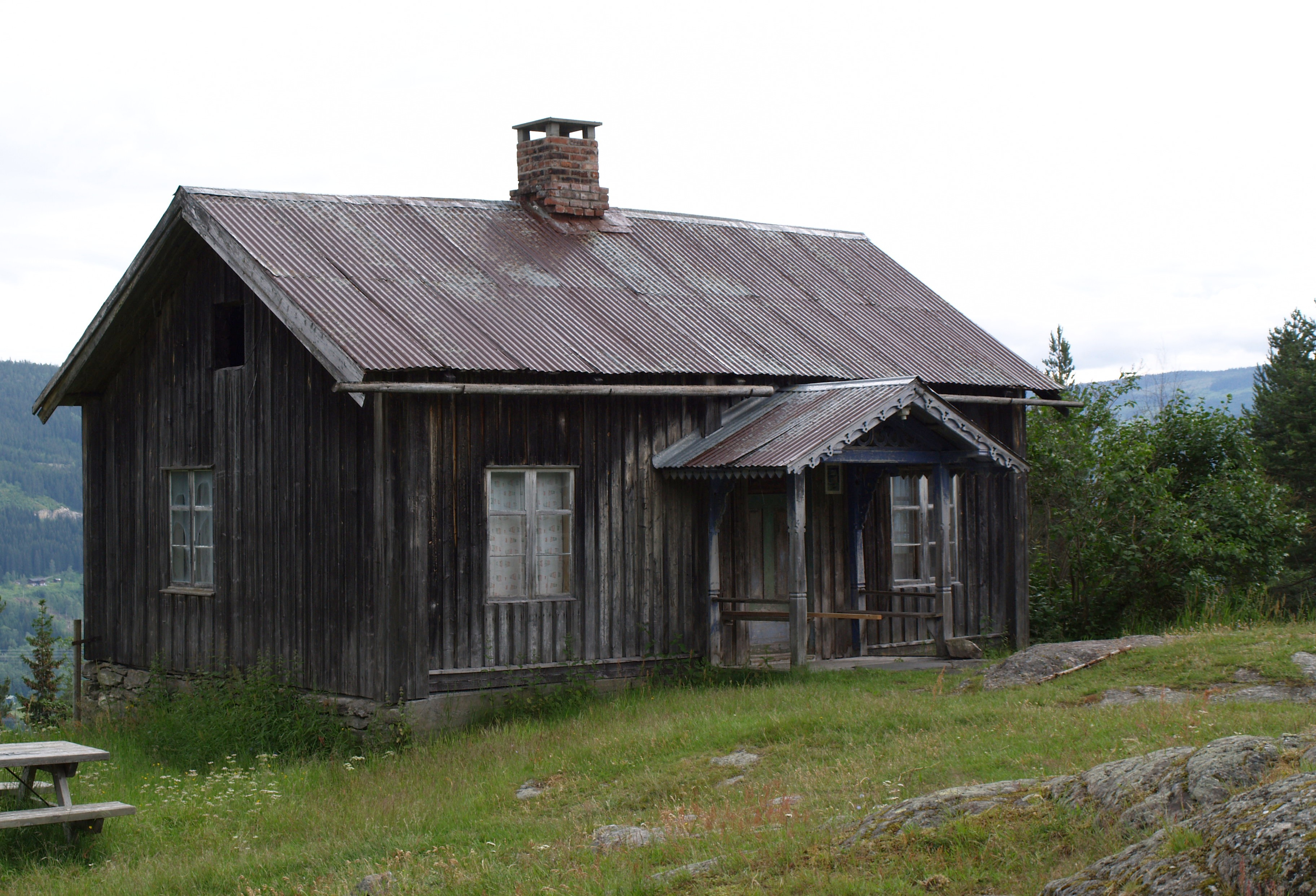
Bagnsbergatn gård.

== See also ==
- Bautahaugen Samlinger
