= Valdres Folkemuseum =

Museum in Norway

Coordinates: 60°58′53″N 9°13′51″E

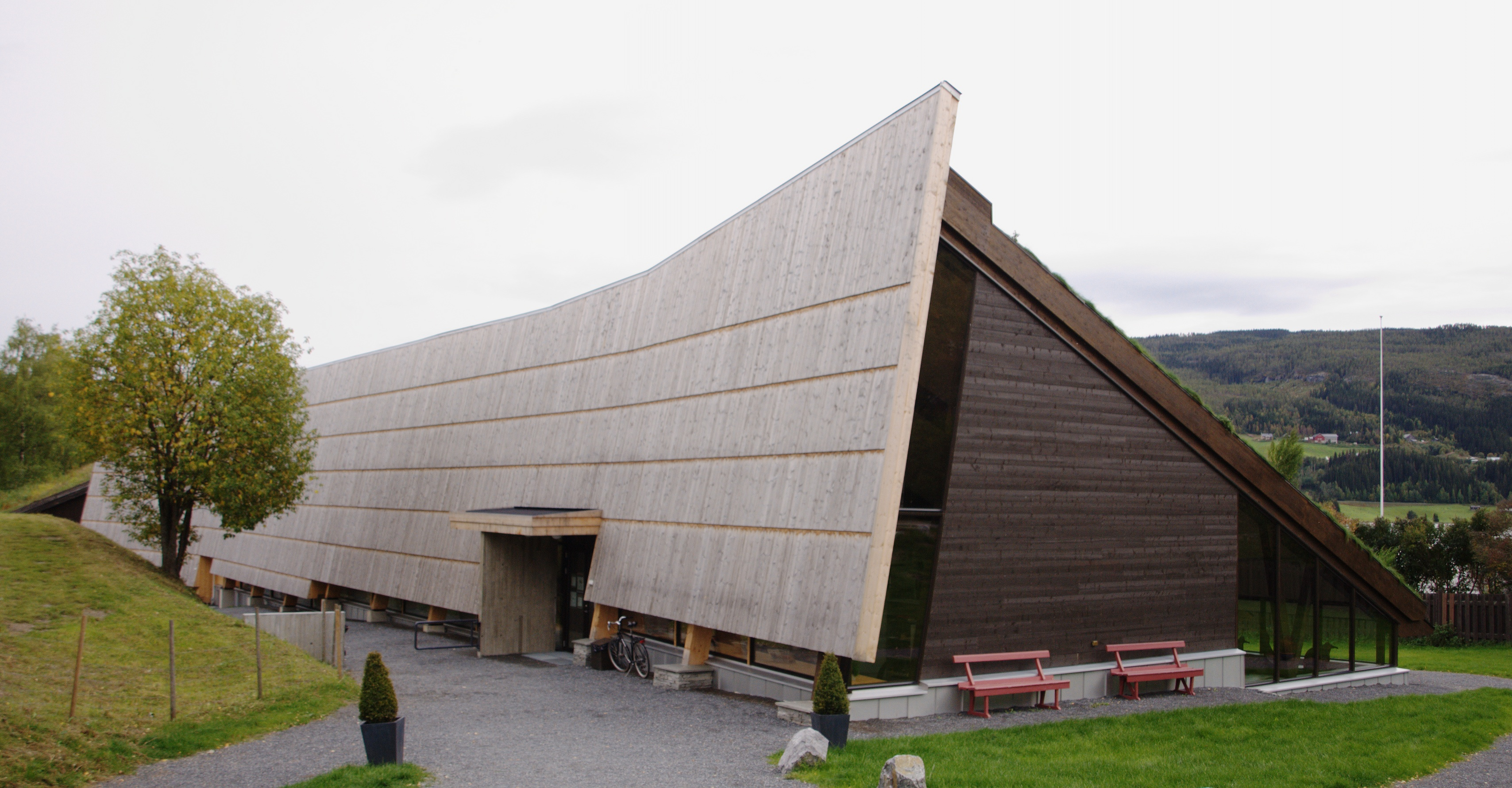
Valdres Folkemuseum Reception and Administration Building

The Valdres Folkemuseum is a folk museum located at Storøya outside Fagernes in Nord-Aurdal Municipality in Innlandet county, Norway.

== Overview ==
Valdres Folk Museum was founded in 1901. It is located in the traditional rural district of Valdres. The museum is on a small ridge reaching out into Strandefjorden, with the larger buildings closest to the entrance and with smaller farm houses up on the slightly higher area reaching out into the lake. There are 95 houses and other constructions, comprising around 20,000 items, and the museum is the fourth largest Norwegian outdoor museum. All the items in the museum are original and have been collected from various farms and other locations in the area. Valdres Folk Museum hosts various cultural events including folk music festivals, seminars and open air theatre. During 2010, a new reception building was opened and linked to the administration building. The museum runs several subsidiaries including Bagn Bygdesamling and Bautahaugen Samlinger, both located in Sør-Aurdal Municipality. The museum in Fagernes also hosts The Norwegian Institute of Bunad and Folk Costume.

== Notable buildings ==
Brennbygningen (main house) comes from Brenna in the small village Åbjør in Nord-Aurdal Municipality. It was bought in 1945 and relocated the following year. It is assumed the building dates to around 1740. At the top floor there are beds built as closed constructions, so that their occupants would keep warm in the winter time.

Handeloftet (main house) is the first building at Valdres Folkemuseum, bought from Hande farm in Vestre Slidre Municipality on 27 December 1905 for the amount of 1000 kroner. Originally it was reerected at Valdres Bygdesamling in 1906, and relocated to its current location in 1923. It is assumed to have been built in the period 1530–1640. The outside gallery surrounds the building on three sides. This building is named loft indicating a storage house, yet it is assumed it has always been a main house.

Hovistabburet (storage house) is from Hovi farm in Øystre Slidre Municipality, most likely built in the 13th century. The building was bought in 1944 and moved to its current location. At the top floor there is an unusual room named the virgin room. The door posts has ornaments from the medieval period. The building underwent restoration in 1960.

Rognebygningen (main house) from Rogne farm in Øystre Slidre Municipality, was probably built 1670–1680. In previous times the farm has been an officer's farm (kapteinsgard), then a bailiff's farm (lensmannsgard) and later an inn (skysstasjon). Captain Johan Reinert resided at the farm between 1670 and 1680, later captain Jacob de Caucheron resided there between 1712 and 1720. Valdres Folkemuseum bought the house in 1917 and relocated it to its current location in 1923. It is known that Michael Sars and Aasmund Olavsson Vinje resided in the building when they traveled to Eidsbugarden.

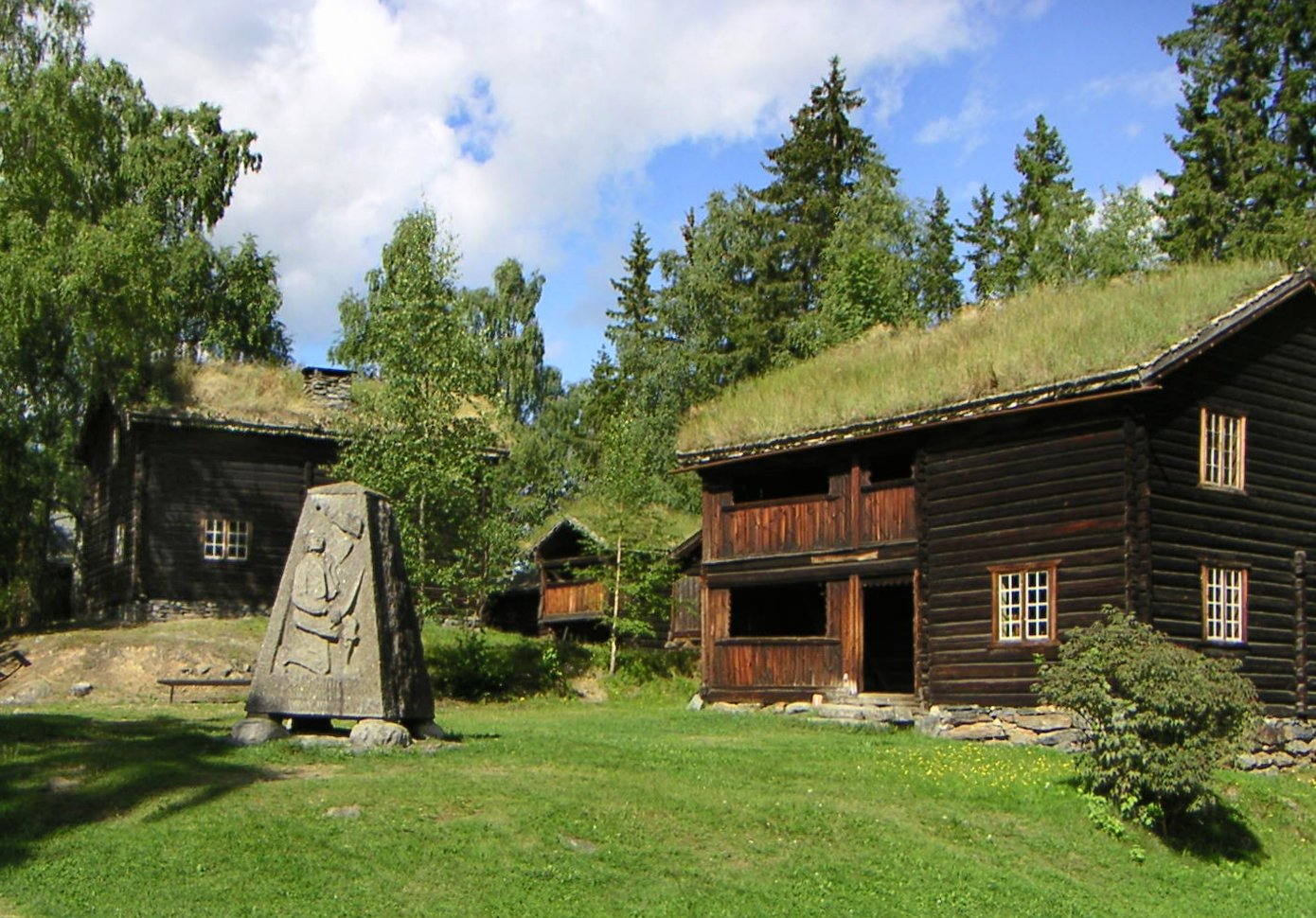
Brennbygningen

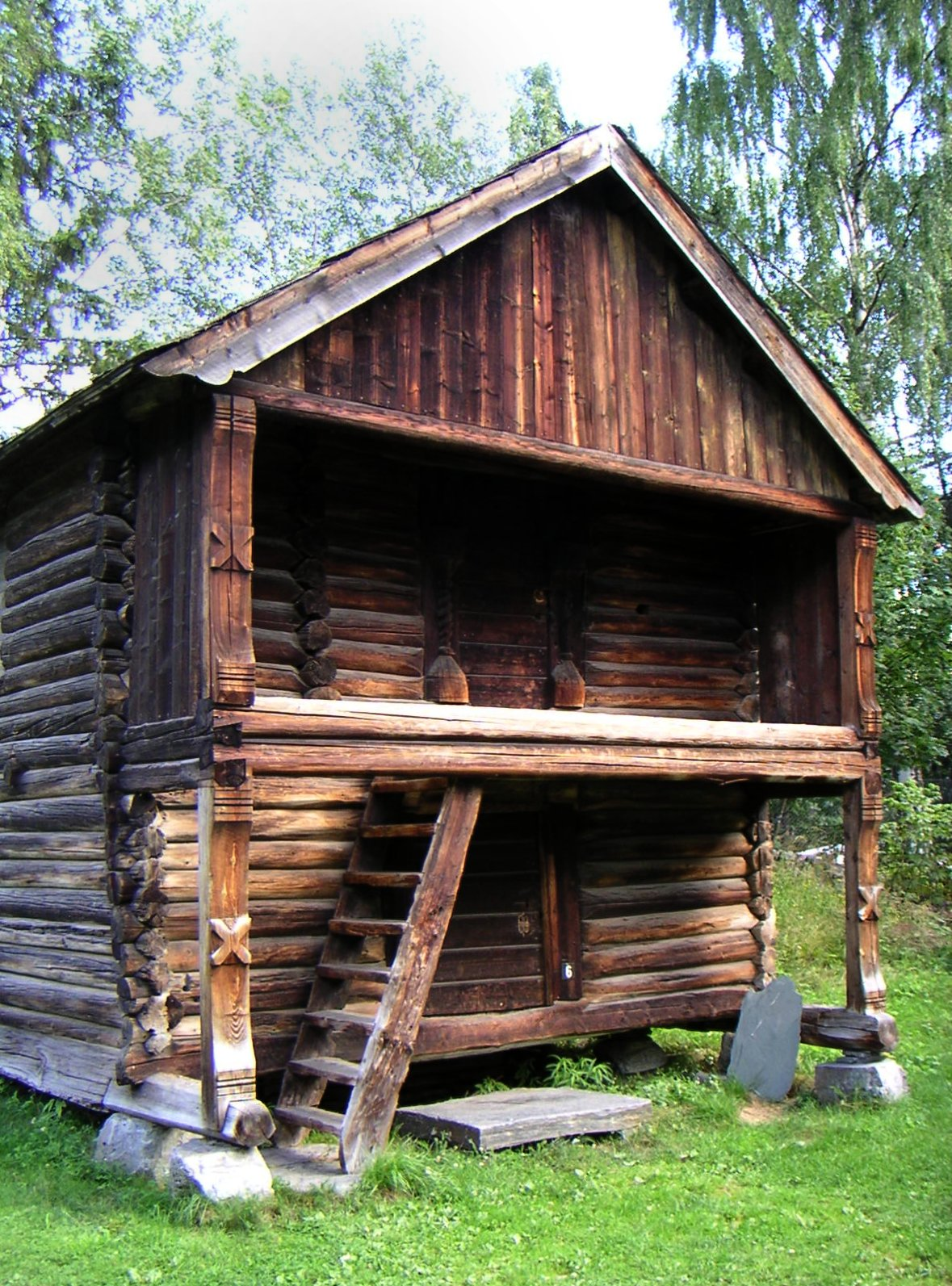
Hovistabburet

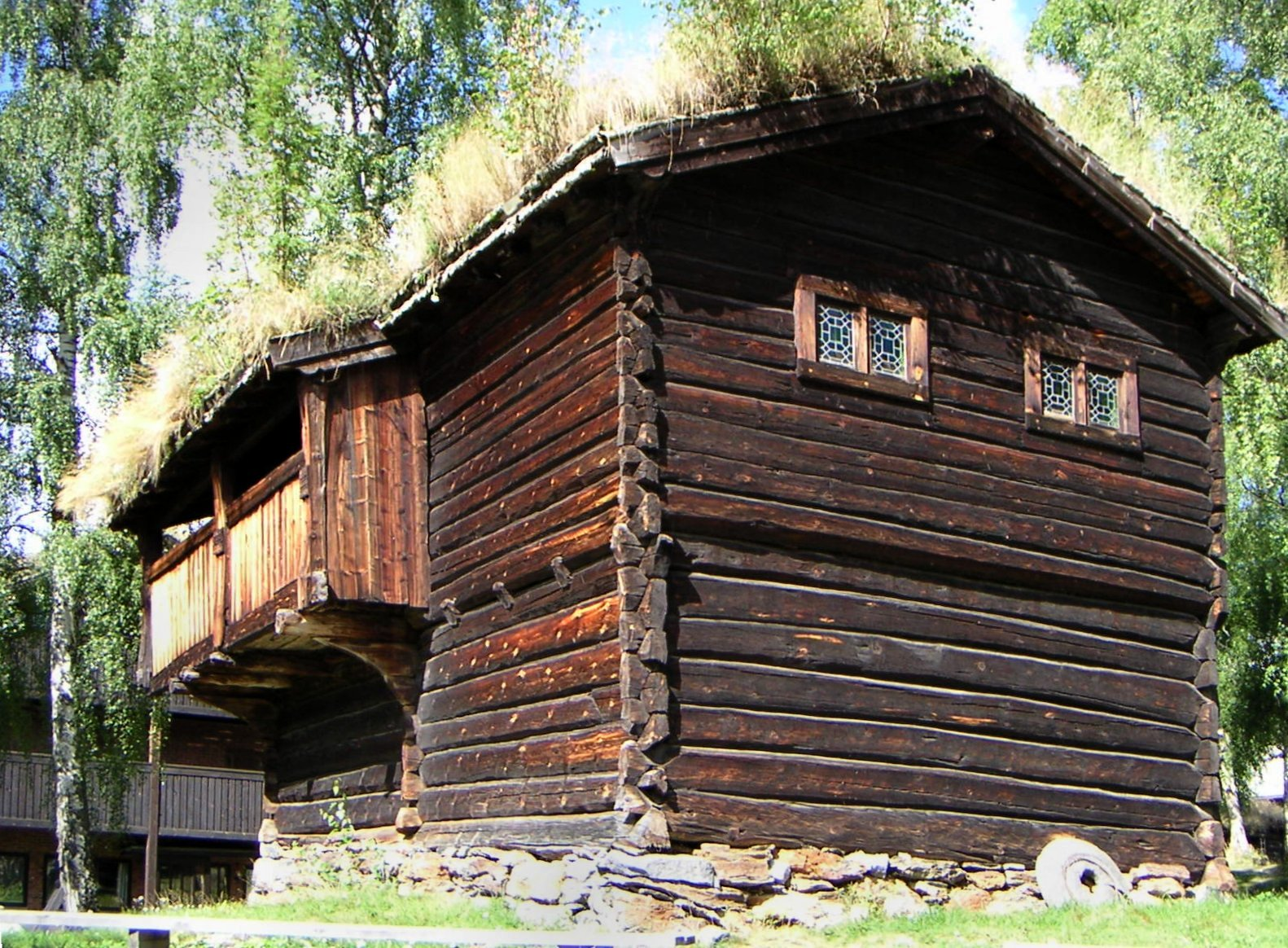
Handeloftet

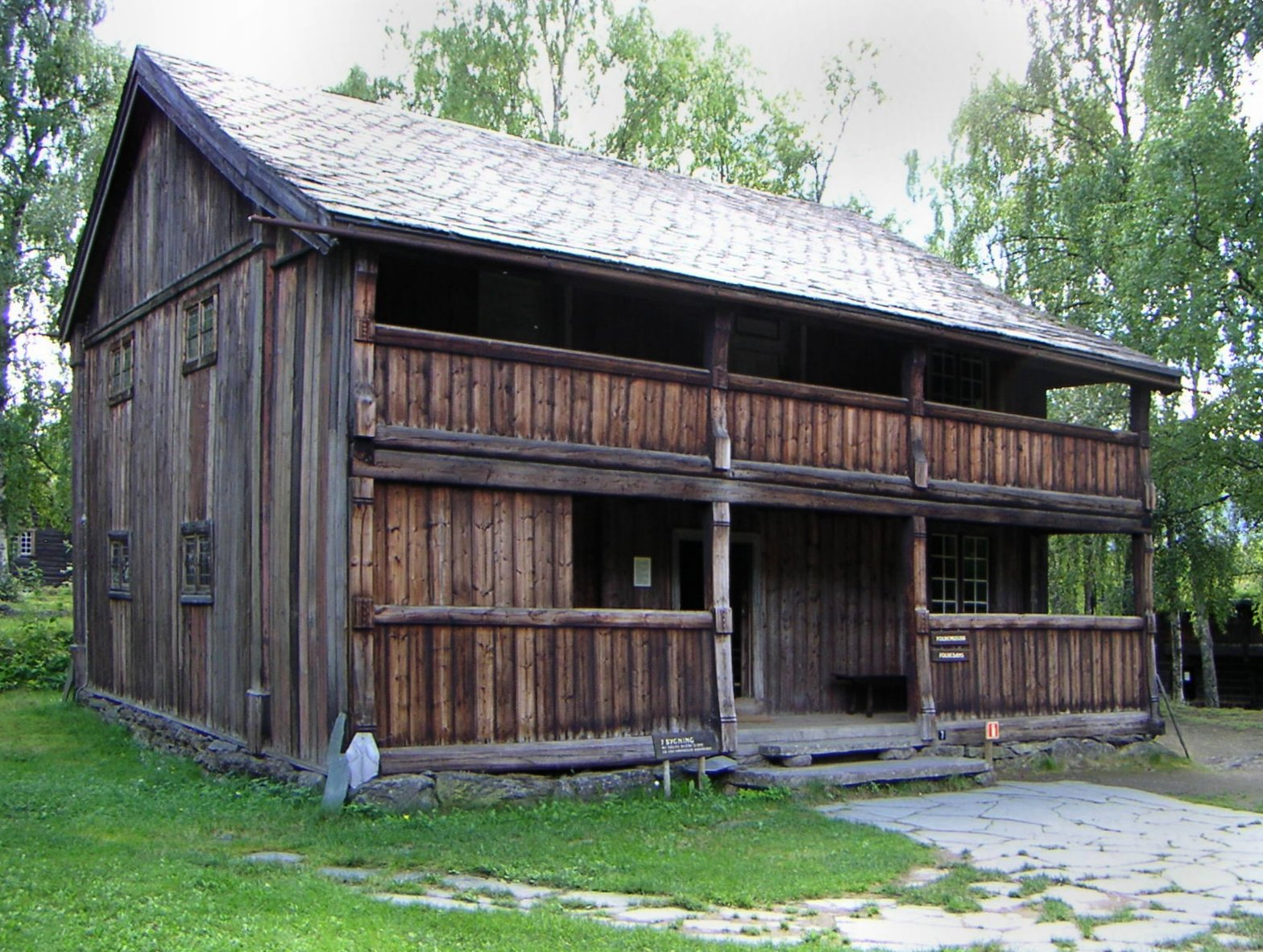
Rognebygningen

== Collections ==
- Old toys
- Genealogy
- Folk music, recordings and folk dance
- Bunad — (traditional district costumes)
