= Ål Bygdamuseum =

Museum in Norway

Coordinates: 60°37′46.51″N 8°32′25.83″E

Ål Bygdamuseum, a small museum on the farm Leksvol in Ål municipality in Buskerud, Norway, is a subsidiary of Hallingdal Museum. It includes 30 old buildings, including the house from Leksvol farm which dates from about 1600, a mountain farm (støl) with a stone building, and a cotter's farm place.
