= Bautahaugen Samlinger =

Museum in Norway

Coordinates: 60°35′9″N 9°44′19″E

Bautahaugen Samlinger (lit. 'Bautahaugen collections') is a small museum in the Hedalen valley of Sør-Aurdal Municipality, Norway. The museum is a subsidiary of Valdres Folkemuseum.

== History ==
Bautahaugen was founded in 1902, by local trader Erik J. Bergsrud (1848–1915) and farmer Elling Goplerud (1864–1932). Bautahaugen Samlinger is located in the central part of Hedalen, in a small forest overlooking the valley and with the mountains framing the landscape.

Today there are 15 buildings and 2,500 individual objects in the museum. Bautahaugen consists of a collection of old buildings and objects from Hedalen, one of the oldest villages in Valdres. All of the buildings at the museum are from small local farms and include houses used for hunting and fishing in the nearby mountains and the valleys of Vassfaret and Vidalen. Hedal Stave Church is situated a bit further up the Hedalen valley.

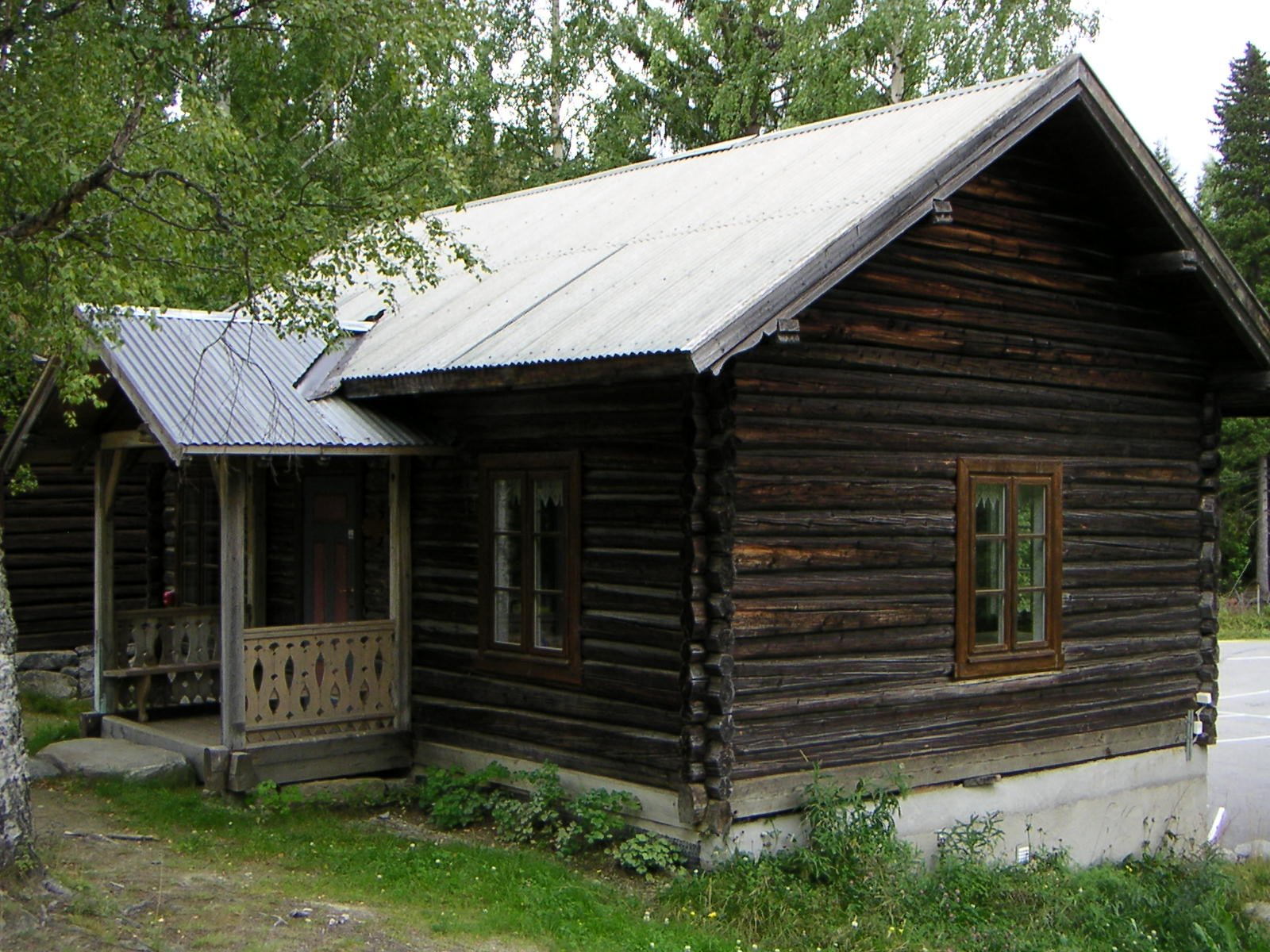
Main house, Brakastuggua 1750

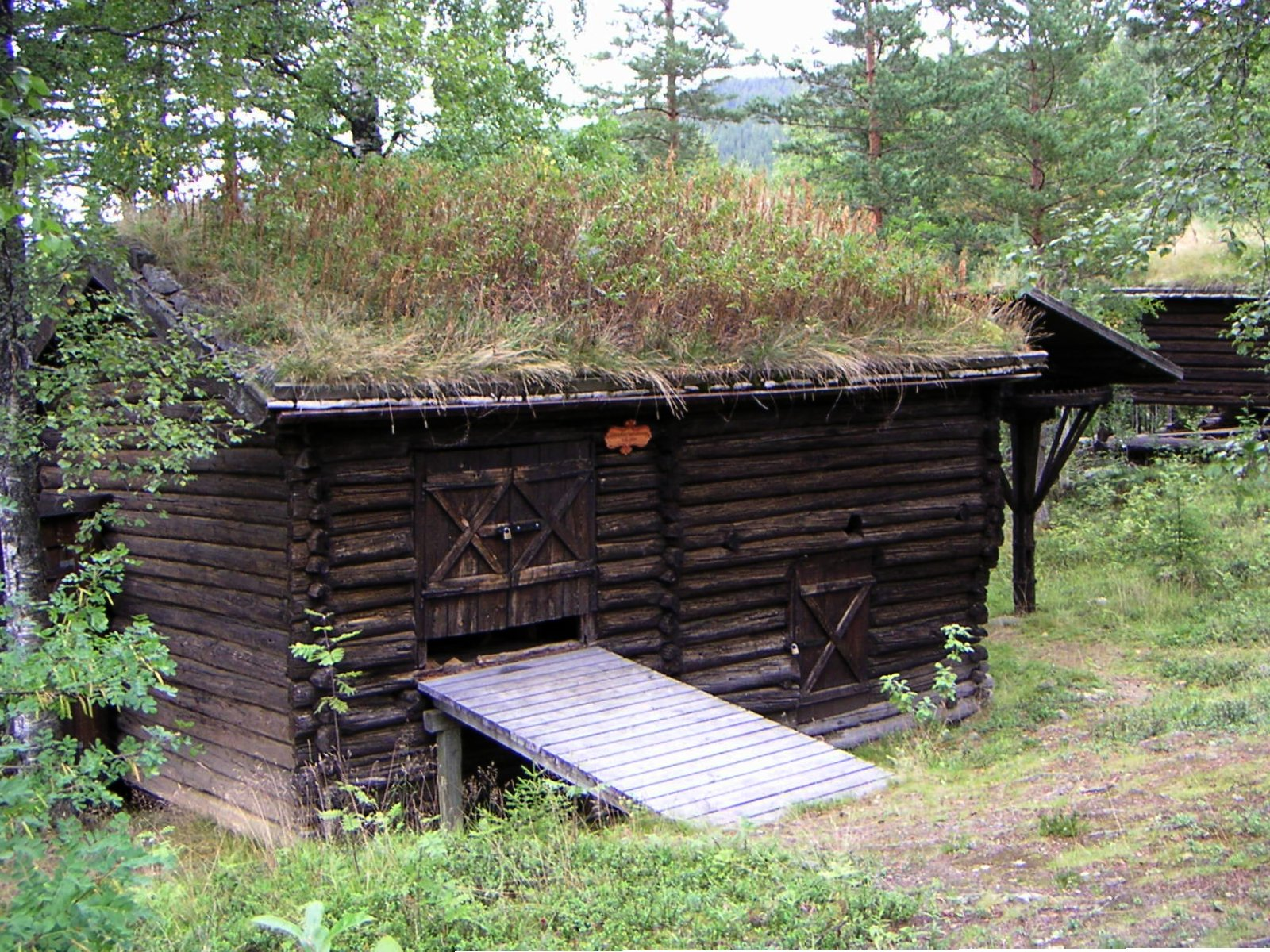
Barn, Låve

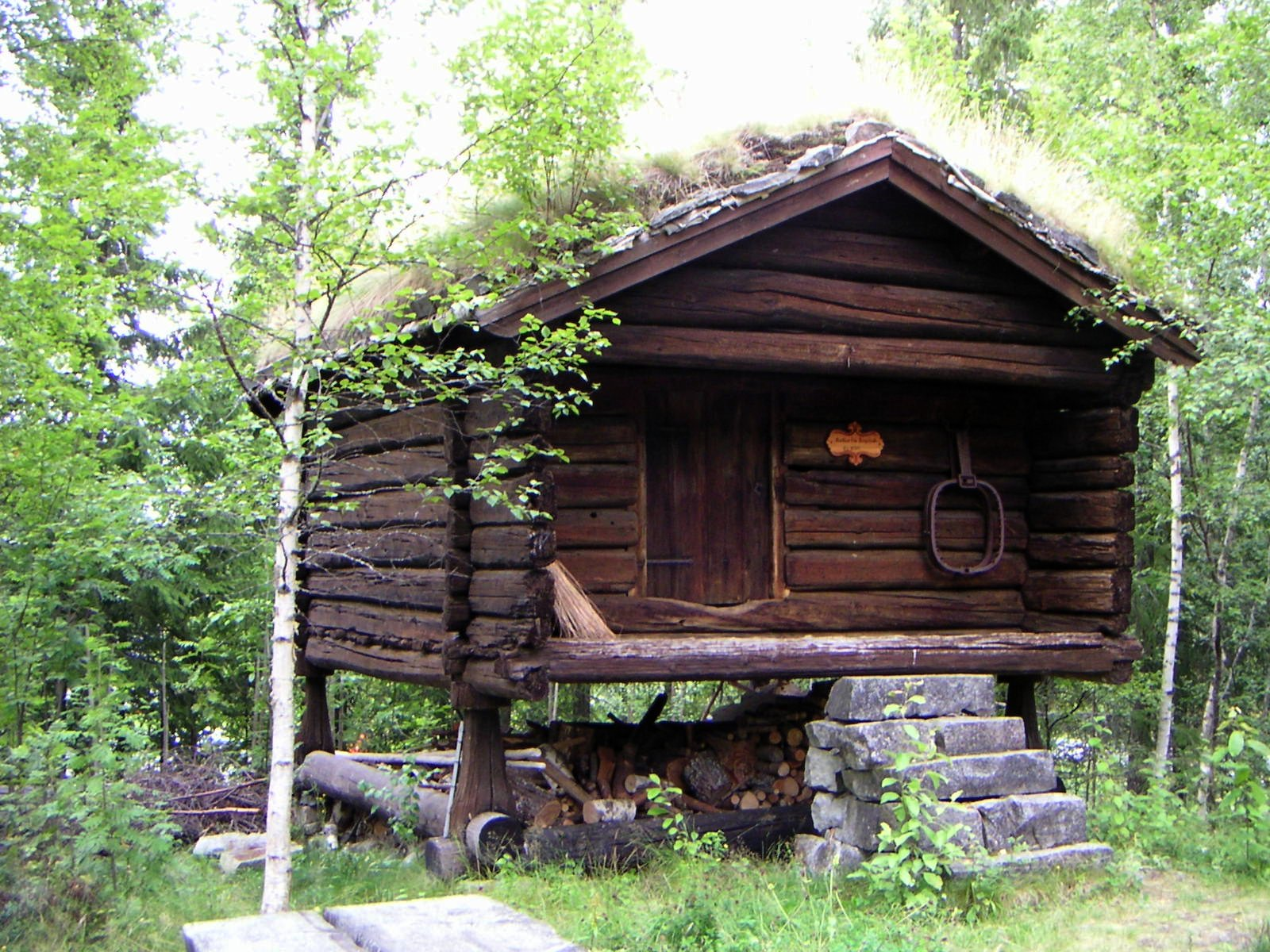
Storage house from Bergsrud 1650

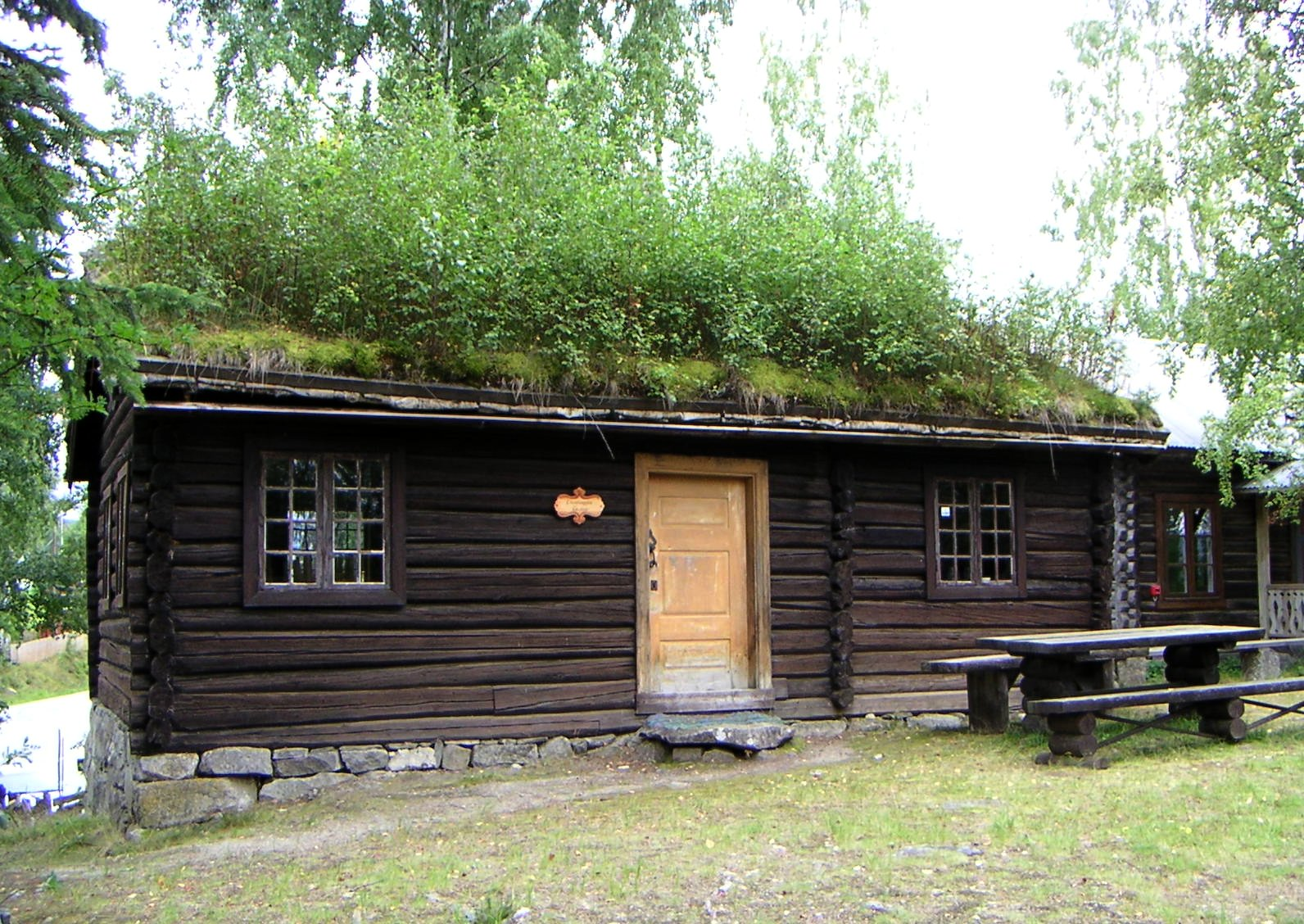
Main house, Lisstuggua 1750

== See also ==
- Bagn Bygdesamling
