= List of botanical gardens in Norway =

Botanical gardens in Norway have collections consisting of Norway native and endemic species as well as plants from around the world. There are botanical gardens and arboreta in all states and territories of Norway, most are administered by local governments, some are privately owned.

- Agder Natural History Museum and Botanical Garden, Kristiansand
- Universitetshagene Bergen: Musehagen, Arboret og Bergen botaniske hage, Bergen
- Botanisk hage, Tøyen, Oslo
- Ringve botanical garden, Trondheim
- Rogaland Aboret, Sandnes
- Stavanger Botanic Garden, Stavanger
- Arctic-Alpine Botanic Garden, Tromsø
