= Gol Bygdetun =

Outdoor museum in Buskerud, Norway

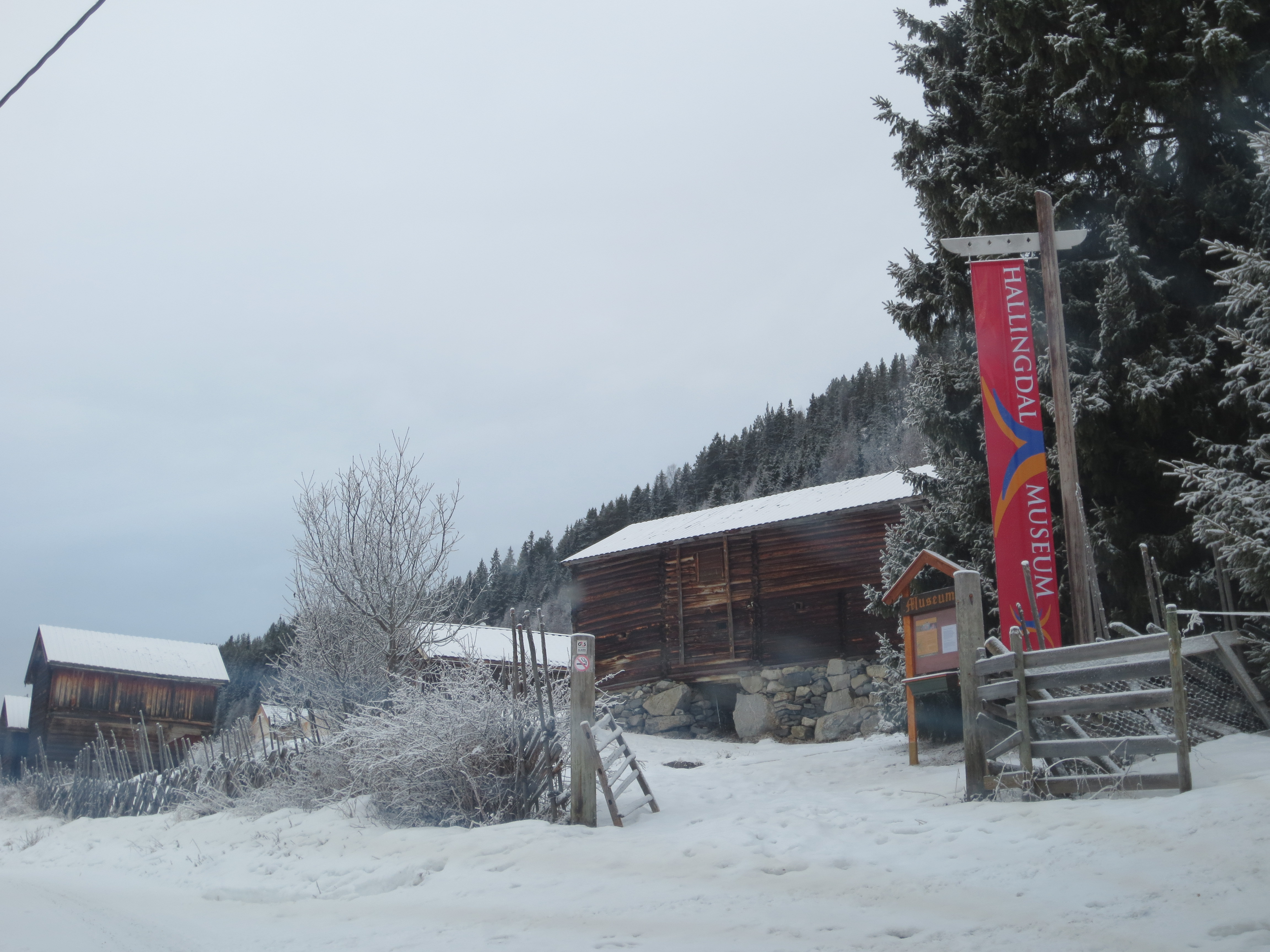
- Gol Bygdetun
- Coordinates: 60°42′08″N 8°56′34″E

Gol Bygdetun is an outdoor museum in the village of Gol in Buskerud county, Norway. Gol Bygdetun is a subsidiary of Hallingdal Museum.

Gol is located in the traditional rural region of Hallingdal. Gol Bygdetun was built around the former Skaga farm. The museum contains farm buildings of various types. The museum features a stabbur, barn, sauna, summer farm, mill, and smokehouse. The museum also includes Dokken Fjellgard, a former mountain farm in the nearby village of Sudndalen in Hol.
