= Hemsedal Bygdetun =

Museum in Ulsåk, Norway

Coordinates: 60°50′51″N 8°37′49″E

Hemsedal Bygdatun is a small museum in Ulsåk in Hemsedal municipality in Buskerud county, Norway. The museum is a subsidiary of Hallingdal Museum.
