= Norsk Døvemuseum =

Deaf museum in Trondheim, Norway

Coordinates: 63°25′39″N 10°23′28″E

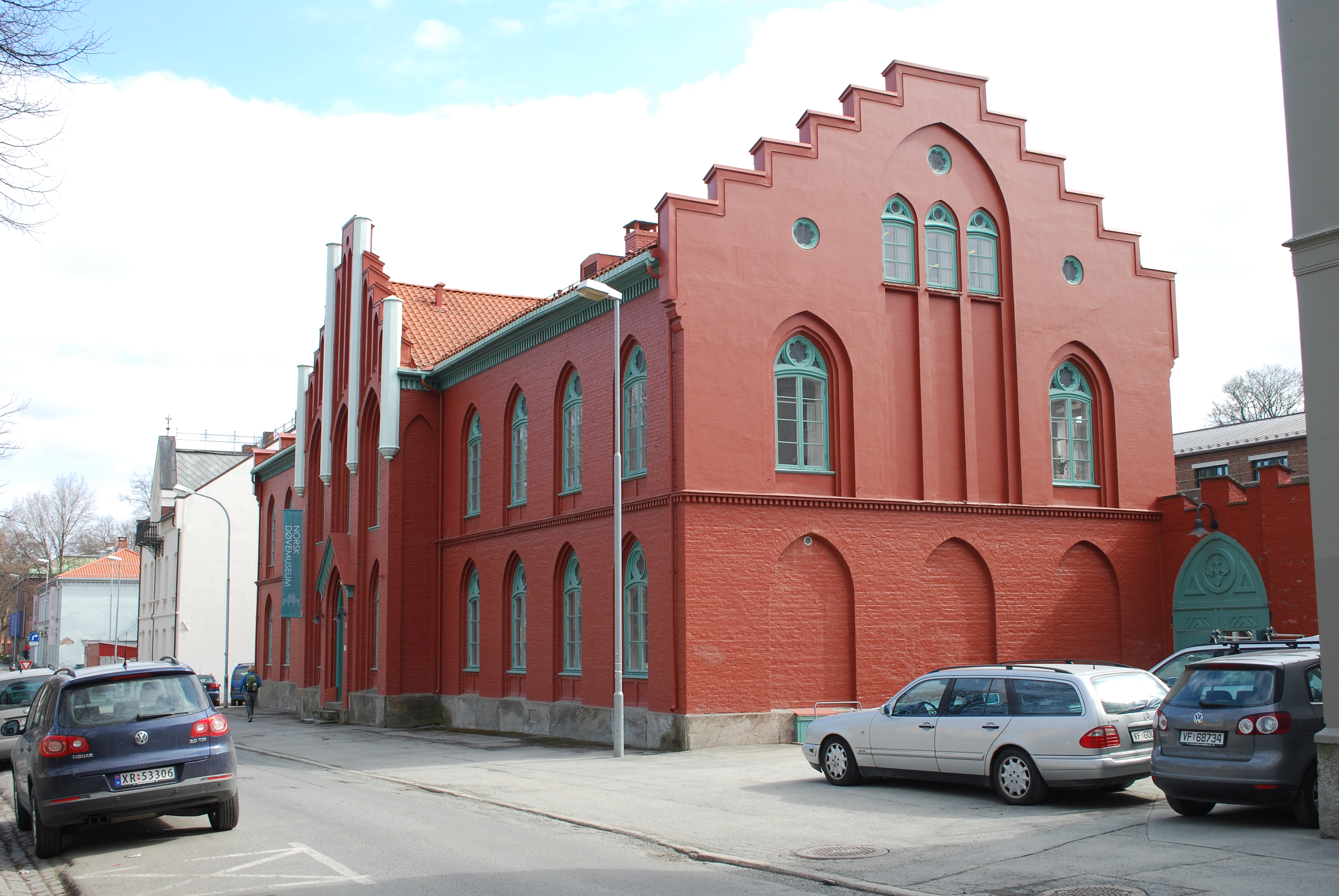
Norsk Døvemuseum in the 1855 Rødbygget

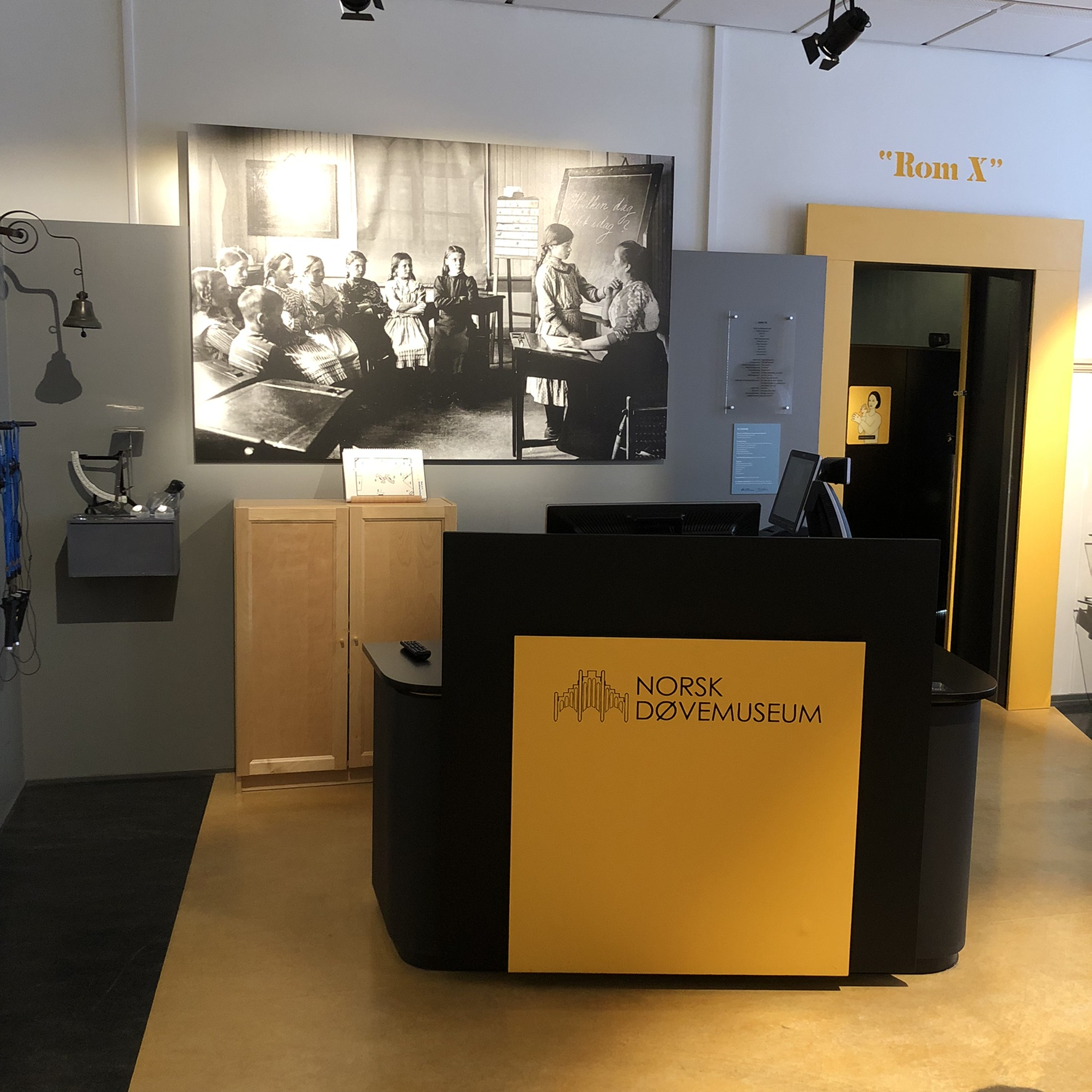
New exhibits opened in 2009

Norsk Døvemuseum ('Norwegian Deaf Museum') is a museum in Trondheim, Norway. It is a division of Trøndelag Folkemuseum. The museum is located in Rødbygget, which was drawn by Christian Heinrich Grosch. It was the first Neo-Gothic building in Trondheim, built in 1855. The museum was established in 1992, and rebuilt in 2009. Today the upper floors hold offices, and a café is located on the first floor.

== Background ==
=== History ===
The building was originally a school for the deaf, Throndhjems Døvstummeinstitut ('Trondheim Deaf-Mute Institute') and later Trondheim offentlige skole for døve ('Trondheim Public School for the Deaf'), founded by Andreas Christian Møller. It included apartments for both-sex students and the warden, and a prayer room. During World War II it was used as a hospital. In 1991 the school was transferred to Heimdal.

=== Rødbygget ===
The Neo-Gothic style was characteristic of Grosch's later works. A common element of these was the brick façade. The highly decorated inner courtyard is rather unusual in Trondheim.
