= Nordmøre Museum =

Local history museum organization in Nordmøre, Norway

Coordinates: 63.10911°N 7.73110°E

The Nordmørsmusea AS is a Norwegian regional cultural history museum for the Nordmøre district in Møre og Romsdal County. The museum has its head office in Kristiansund at Storgata 19.

The museum currently has branches in all of the municipalities in Nordmøre:

- Smøla Municipality (the Smøla museum, Norwegian Marsh Museum, Old Rangnes School, Rosvoll Prestegård)
- Kristiansund Municipality (Patrick Volckmar house)
- Averøy Municipality and Hustadvika Municipality (the Old Kvernes Rural Museum)
- Tingvoll Municipality (Tingvoll Museum)
- Surnadal Municipality (the Åsen Village Museum, Kleiva Poet's Home, and Svinvik Arboretum)
- Rindal Municipality
- Aure Municipality (the Kråksund Fishing Museum)
- Heim Municipality (a museum dedicated to the traditional geitbåt 'goat boat' and the Husasnotra boat-building area)
- Sunndal Municipality (the Sunndal Museum in the Leikvin Heritage Park)
