= The Science Factory =

- Vitenfabrikken
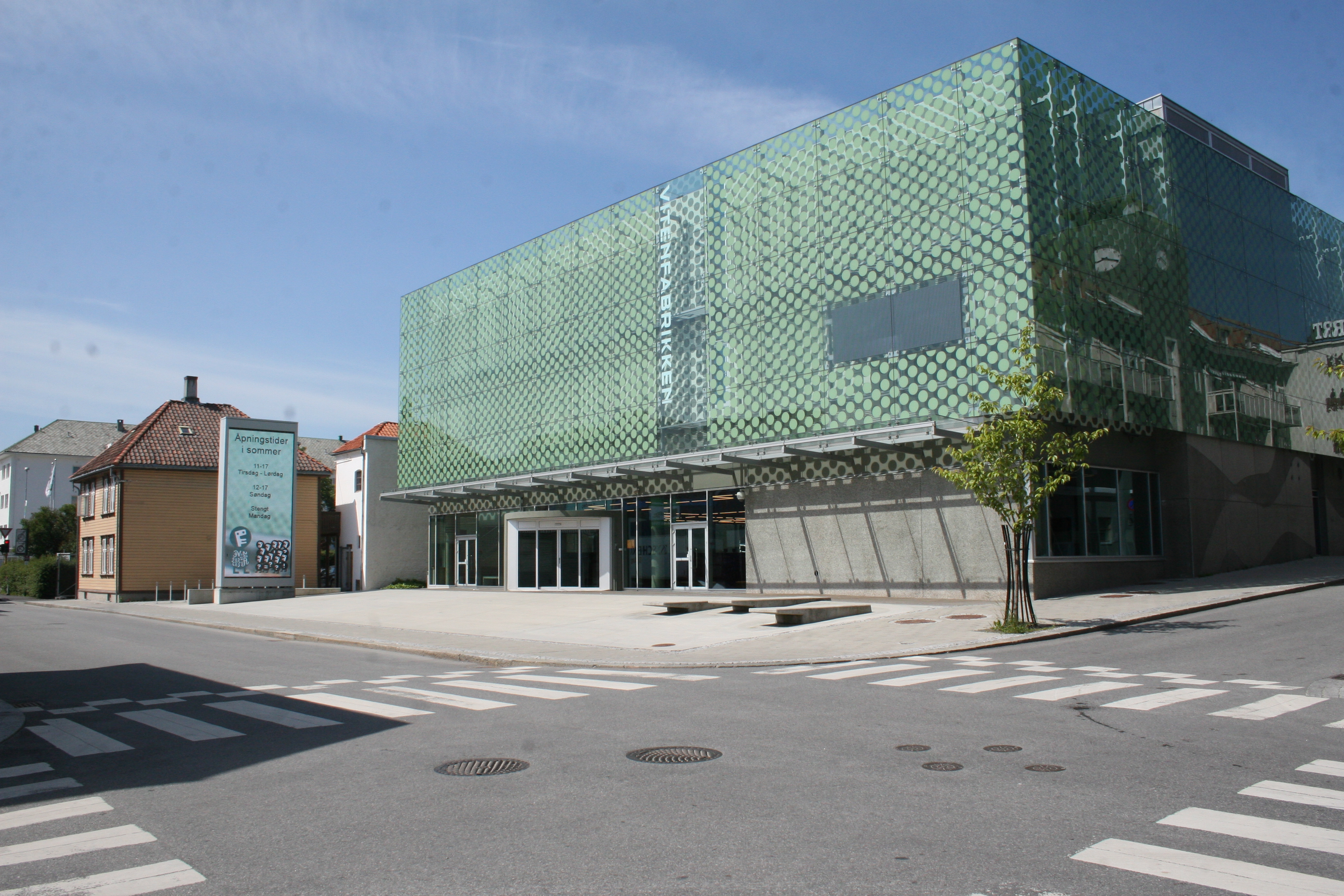
- The Science Factory in 2010
- Established: 22 May 2008
- Location: Sandnes, Rogaland, Norway
- Coordinates: 58°51′5″N 5°43′51.8″E
- Type: Science museum
- Website: www.jaermuseet.no/anlegga-vare/vitenfabrikken

Science Factory (Norwegian: Vitenfabrikken) is a museum and science center located in the city of Sandnes, in Rogaland, Norway.

== Background ==
The Science Factory opened in May 2008. It is a science museum with exhibitions about mathematic, astronomy, chemistry, physics, art, and technology. The history of Sandnes also well as regional history also showcased in the museum. In June 2013 a new exhibition called 100% energy was opened. As a part of the exhibition, the Science Factory has their own Tesla Coil. In the weekends and summer there are shows and educational workshops. The Planetarium is located in the center of the Science Factory. The Science Factory also has a Foucault pendulum (named after Jean-Bernard-Leon Foucault) weighing 60 kg and is 11,17 meters long. There is an observation terrace located on the fourth floor featuring two telescopes.

The Science Factory is the largest department of the regional museum, Jaermuseet, which is headquartered in Nærbø. Jærmuseet is also responsible for running several other local museum facilities in various parts of the region of Jæren. Jærmuseet is the regional science museum for the municipalities of Randaberg, Sola, Sandnes, Gjesdal, Klepp, Time and Hå. Jaermuseet received the Museum of the Year 2009 award in Norway (Årets Museum 2009 i Norge) and also the Luigi Micheletti Award 2009 for best technological museum.

== Exhibitions ==
=== Abel's Sketchbook ===
Abel's Sketchbook (Abels skissebok) is an interactive exhibition that shows the relationship between art, technology and science. The name is inspired by the famous mathematician Niels Henrik Abel, who was born at Finnøy in Ryfylke not far from Sandnes. The exhibitions is based on the art and industry in the region of Jæren.

Topics include:

- The brain
- Cultural influence
- Materials (clay, wood, fiber and metal)
- Tools
- Energy
- Logistics

=== Planetarium ===
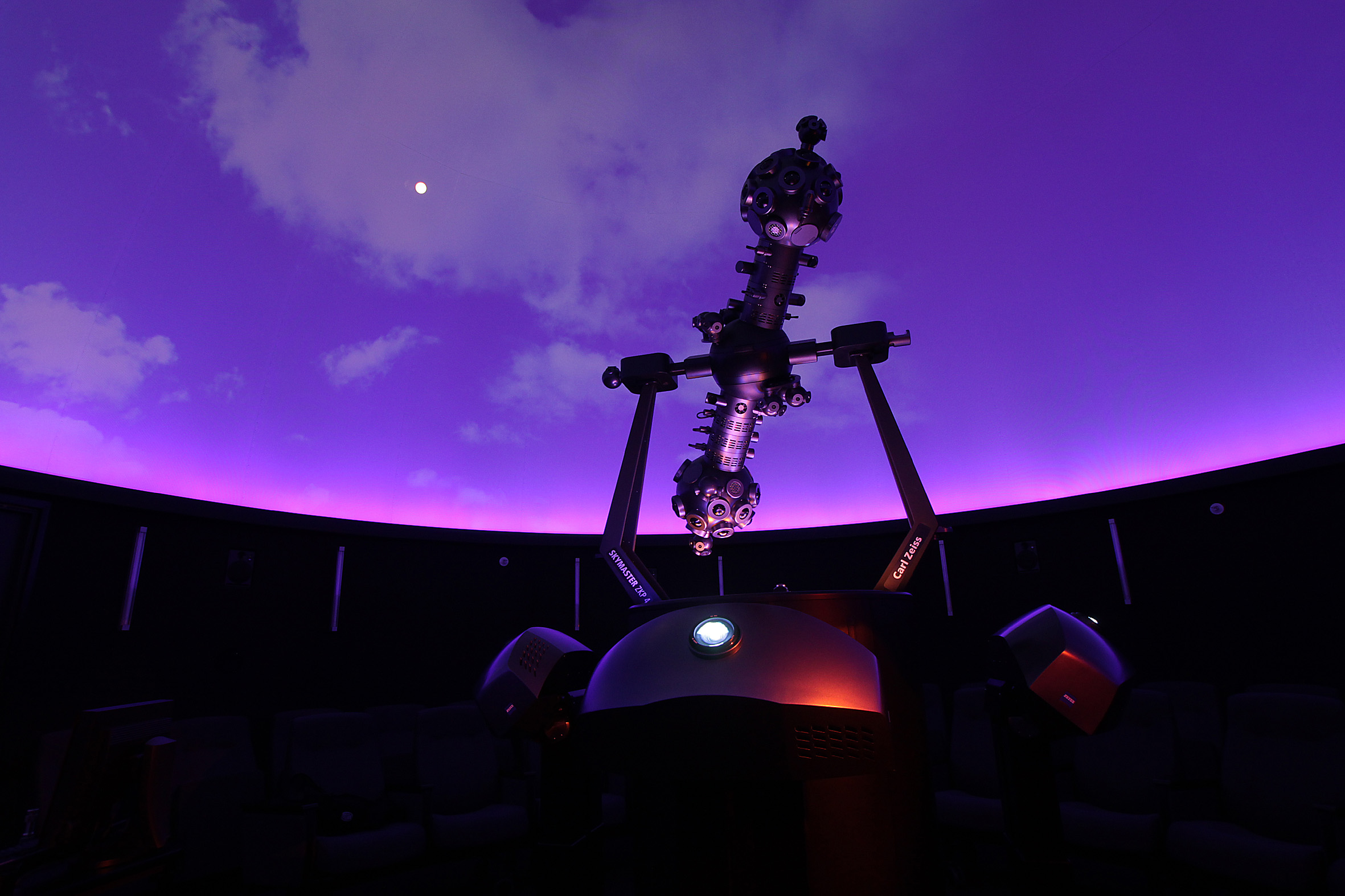
Inside the Planetarium

In the middle of the building the planetarium looms above the café. It is a large dome-shaped projection screen where you can see the stars, planets and galaxies. In addition to the guided tours of the starry sky, several educational movies about different topics are shown. There are films in Norwegian and in English. There are 52 seats, and was when it opened (2008) as one out of five planetariums in the world using a combined Skymaster ZKP 4 optomechanical projector and Spacegate system from Carl Zeiss.

In 2019 the planetarium underwent a technical upgrade of the projection system. It operates a combined Skymaster ZKP 4 LED optomechanical projector and Powerdome 3 system with two Zeiss Velvet projectors from Carl Zeiss.

=== Other exhibits ===
- Krossen Havremølle is an exhibition that features oat processing and how important that has been to the region.
- "Øglænd in 150" is an exhibition over 2 floors which shows the history of the company Øglænd. One floor is dedicated to the production of clothing, the other of bicycles and motorbikes.
- Abelloftet is a mathematical exhibition on the fourth floor. Named after the Norwegian mathematician Niels Henrik Abel it contains more than 50 interactive experiments and installations, including a square bicycle and a human sized kaleidoscope.
- Astronomy and space exploration is an exhibition that features a spaceship, a terrella and a cloud chamber.
- There are several new additions to the exhibitions, including the most recent one - a domino course and marble run.

== Reviews ==
In 2012 National Geographic wrote this about the Science Factory: "The Science Factory: My favorite place by far, the Science Factory is in nearby Sandnes and serves as a high-tech playpen for kids of all ages. Stargaze in the planetarium..."
