= Klepp =

Klepp may refer to:

== People ==
- Bärbel Klepp (born 1957), a retired East German 400-metre hurdler
- Ernst Klepp (1889–1958), an Austrian infantry general and jurist
- Herbert Klepp (1923–1976), an Austrian sprint canoeist
- Katja Klepp (born 1967), a German sport shooter
- Mart Klepp (born 1963), a Canadian sports shooter
- Olav Klepp (born 1962), a Norwegian former professional footballer
- Rudolf Klepp, an Austrian retired slalom canoeist

== Places ==
- Klepp Municipality, a municipality in Rogaland county, Norway
- Klepp stasjon, a village in Klepp Municipality in Rogaland county, Norway
- Klepp Station, a railway station in Klepp Municipality in Rogaland county, Norway
- Klepp Church, a church in Klepp Municipality in Rogaland county, Norway

== Other ==
- Klepp Sparebank, a former bank in Rogaland, Norway
- Klepp IL, a sports club based in Klepp Municipality in Rogaland county, Norway
- Klepp I Runestone, a runestone found in Klepp Municipality in Rogaland county, Norway

== See also ==
- Kleppe (disambiguation)
