= Verdalen =

Village in Klepp Municipality, Norway

- Village
- Interactive map of Verdalen
- Coordinates: 58.78496°N 5.60993°E
- Country: Norway
- Region: Western Norway
- County: Rogaland
- District: Jæren
- Municipality: Klepp Municipality
- Elevation: 39 m (128 ft)
- Time zone: UTC+01:00 (CET)
  - Summer (DST): UTC+02:00 (CEST)
- Post Code: 4352 Kleppe

Verdalen is a village in Klepp Municipality in Rogaland county, Norway. The village is located immediately northwest of the municipal centre of Kleppe, south of the village of Voll, and east of the village of Bore.

The residential village of Verdalen has grown together with the larger village of Kleppe since the year 2000, forming one large 3.26-square-kilometre (1.26 sq mi) urban area with a population of 10,092 people in 2025.
