= Foss-Eikeland =

Village in Sandnes Municipality, Norway

Foss-Eikeland Foss-Eikjeland Fosseikeland
- Village
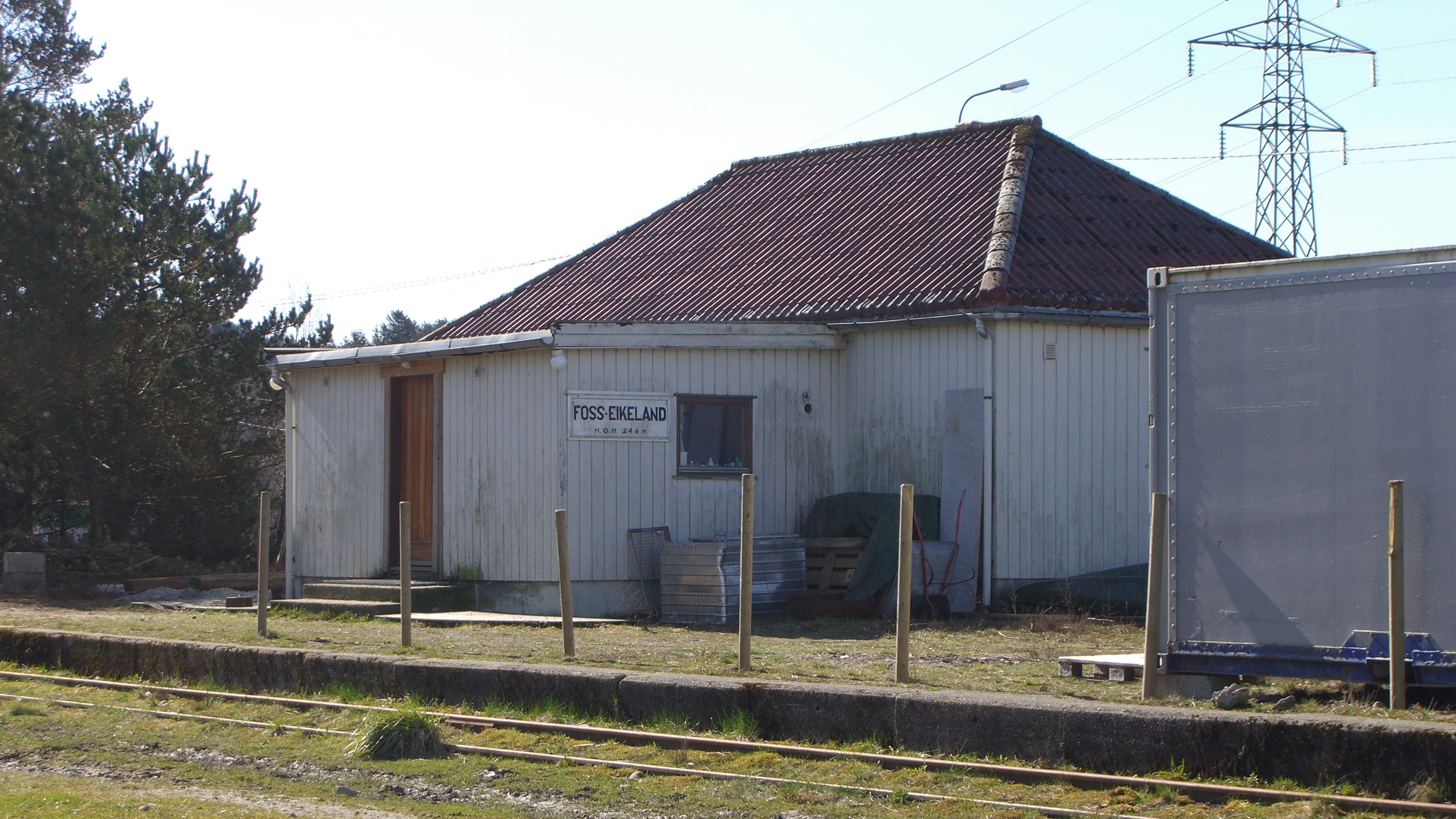
- View of the former railway station in Foss-Eikeland
- Interactive map of Foss-Eikeland
- Coordinates: 58.80242°N 5.73232°E
- Country: Norway
- Region: Western Norway
- County: Rogaland
- District: Jæren
- Municipality: Sandnes Municipality
- Elevation: 34 m (112 ft)
- Time zone: UTC+01:00 (CET)
  - Summer (DST): UTC+02:00 (CEST)
- Post Code: 4323 Sandnes

Foss-Eikeland or Foss-Eikjeland is a village in the western part of the large Sandnes Municipality in Rogaland county, Norway. The village lies south of the city of Sandnes, just north of the river Figgjoelva and the municipal border. The neighboring village of Orstad (in Klepp Municipality) lies to the south, across the river. The Ålgård Line previously had a station at Foss-Eikeland, but the railway line is currently closed, but not abandoned.
