= Voll, Rogaland =

Village in Klepp Municipality, Norway

Voll
- Village
- Interactive map of Voll
- Coordinates: 58.80596°N 5.60501°E
- Country: Norway
- Region: Western Norway
- County: Rogaland
- District: Jæren
- Municipality: Klepp Municipality
- Elevation: 9 m (30 ft)
- Time zone: UTC+01:00 (CET)
  - Summer (DST): UTC+02:00 (CEST)
- Post Code: 4354 Voll

Voll is a small village in Klepp Municipality in Rogaland county, Norway. The village is located a short distance north of the river Figgjoelva, just north of the villages of Bore and Verdalen. The village of Tjelta (in Sola Municipality) lies to the north of Voll. The main industries in Voll include agriculture, a Tine dairy facility, and Malm Orstad AS, an oil services company.
