= Marius Lode =

Norwegian footballer (born 1993)

Personal information
- Date of birth: 11 March 1993 (age 33)
- Place of birth: Kvernaland, Norway
- Height: 1.85 m (6 ft 1 in)
- Position: Defender

Team information
- Current team: Sarpsborg 08
- Number: 2

Youth career
- 2009–2011: Frøyland
- 2012: Bryne

Senior career*
Years	Team	Apps	(Gls)
2012–2016	Bryne	117	(0)
2017–2021	Bodø/Glimt	118	(1)
2022	Schalke 04	6	(0)
2022–2024	Bodø/Glimt	30	(0)
2024–2026	Häcken	53	(0)
2026	→ Brisbane Roar (loan)	9	(0)
2026–	Sarpsborg 08	12	(0)

International career^{‡}
2013	Norway U21	1	(0)
2021	Norway	2	(0)
- * Club domestic league appearances and goals as of 8 November 2026 ‡ National team caps and goals as of 15 November 2021

Marius Lode (born 11 March 1993) is a Norwegian professional footballer who plays as a defender for Sarpsborg 08.

== Club career ==
Lode was born in Kvernaland, and started his career in local Frøyland IL. His grandfather comes from Germany.

He made his senior debut for Bryne FK on 9 April 2012 against Strømmen; Bryne won that match 3–1. He played as a defender for Bryne until May 2015, when he was banned from playing professional football, due to a positive drug test, that showed use of Ritalin, a medicinal stimulant drug consisting of methylphenidate. Lode tested positive on Ritalin in May 2015, before a match against Sogndal. He stated he had used Ritalin as performance-enhancing drug before university exams. Lode was banned from playing football in ten months and lost most of the 2016 season. During the ban, he worked in a local restaurant in Bryne and maintained his physique, until he was allowed to train with Bryne FK in October 2016.

Lode signed for Bodø/Glimt before the season in 2017, playing 29 out of 30 matches that season. Bodø/Glimt won the Norwegian first division in 2017 and was promoted to Eliteserien. Before the 2018 season, some Norwegian football clubs were interested in buying Lode, including the relegated teams Viking and Aalesund.

In January 2022, 2. Bundesliga club Schalke 04 announced the signing of Lode on a two-and-a-half-year contract. He was released by Schalke on 16 August 2022.

On 31 August 2022, Lode signed for his old club Bodø/Glimt on a contract lasting until the end of 2025 season, with an option for another year.

On 27 March 2024, Lode was announced at BK Häcken on a three year contract.

== International career ==
Lode made his debut for Norway national team on 24 March 2021 in a World Cup qualifier against Gibraltar.

== Career statistics ==
=== Club ===
As of 8 November 2026

Appearances and goals by club, season and competition
Club	Season	League			Cup		Europe		Total	
Club	Season	Division	Apps	Goals	Apps	Goals	Apps	Goals	Apps	Goals
Bryne	2012	1. divisjon	28	0	2	0	—		30	0
Bryne	2013	1. divisjon	27	0	3	0	—		30	0
Bryne	2014	1. divisjon	23	0	2	0	—		25	0
Bryne	2015	1. divisjon	28	0	3	0	—		31	0
Bryne	2016	1. divisjon	11	0	0	0	—		11	0
Bryne	Total		117	0	10	0	—		127	0
Bodø/Glimt	2017	1. divisjon	29	0	3	0	—		32	0
Bodø/Glimt	2018	Eliteserien	16	0	3	0	—		19	0
Bodø/Glimt	2019	Eliteserien	26	0	1	0	—		27	0
Bodø/Glimt	2020	Eliteserien	26	1	0	0	3	0	29	1
Bodø/Glimt	2021	Eliteserien	21	0	0	0	14	0	35	0
Bodø/Glimt	Total		118	1	7	0	17	0	142	1
Schalke 04	2021–22	2. Bundesliga	6	0	—		—		6	0
Bodø/Glimt	2022	Eliteserien	10	0	0	0	6	0	16	0
Bodø/Glimt	2023	Eliteserien	20	0	8	0	7	0	28	0
Bodø/Glimt	Total		30	0	8	0	13	0	51	0
Häcken	2024	Allsvenskan	28	0	4	0	6	0	38	0
Häcken	2025	Allsvenskan	25	0	1	1	12	0	38	1
Häcken	Total		53	0	5	1	18	0	76	1
Brisbane Roar (loan)	2025–26	A-League Men	9	0	—		—		9	0
Sarpsborg 08	2026	Eliteserien	12	0	3	0	—		15	0
Career total			346	1	33	1	46	0	425	2

=== International ===
As of match played 13 November 2021

Appearances and goals by national team and year
National team	Year	Apps	Goals
Norway	2021	2	0
Total		2	0

== Honours ==
Bodø/Glimt

- Eliteserien: 2020, 2021, 2023

Schalke 04

- 2. Bundesliga: 2021–22
