= Jærens rev =

Reef in Norway

- Revet
- Interactive map of the fjord
- Location: Rogaland county, Norway
- Coordinates: 58.75259°N 5.48266°E
- Type: Reef
- Basin countries: Norway

Jærens rev (lit. 'Jæren's reef') is the westernmost sandbank off the coast of Jæren. It is located approximately 3 miles (4.8 km) off Reve in Klepp Municipality, between Orrestranda and Borestranda. Its location has been used to define the limits of the Norwegian fishery zone.

== The shoal ==
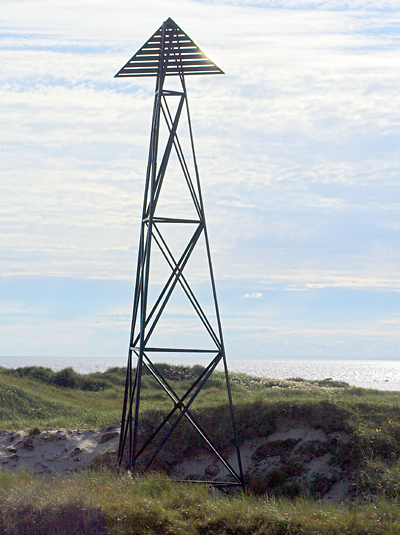
Day mark. Aid to sea navigation. Location: Jærens rev Credit: Roar Johansen

The shoal is a partly stony sandbar and extends almost 2 nautical miles (3.7 km) to the west in front of the Revtangen headland, the westernmost point of Jæren. It is very shallow: at Klausgrunnen, about 1.5 nautical miles (2.8 km) off the coast, the water depth is still only 3.5 metres (11 ft).

A light buoy is located about 1.8 nautical miles (3.3 km) off the coast at the western end of the shoal, approximately at 58°45′N 5°26′E, for safe passage making. A 16.5 metres (54 ft) high steel mark on Revtangen built in 2004 also serves as a navigational beacon; its top mark has a side length of 4 metres (13 ft). A first wooden navigation mark was set up here as early as 1854; it was replaced by a steel construction in 1911, which was dismantled in 1994 and only replaced by the current beacon ten years later.

About 6 nautical miles (11 km) further north-northeast is the Feistein Lighthouse on the small Feistein archipelago at 58°49′35″N 05°30′19″E.

== Wildlife ==
Jæren's rev is a very well known locality for waders. Since 1937, the Stavanger Museum has had an ornithological station (Revtangen Ornithological Station) on the mainland nearby. The Norwegian Air Force took possession of parts of the site in the 1950s as a target area for bombs and gunfire, and the ornithological station was therefore relocated in the autumn of 1954 about 1.5 kilometres (0.93 mi) further northeast, to a point near the Reve farms, where it is still located today. Every year between 6,000 and 12,000 waders and passerines are caught there, ringed and then released again. Almost 300 different bird species have been observed there since its opening.

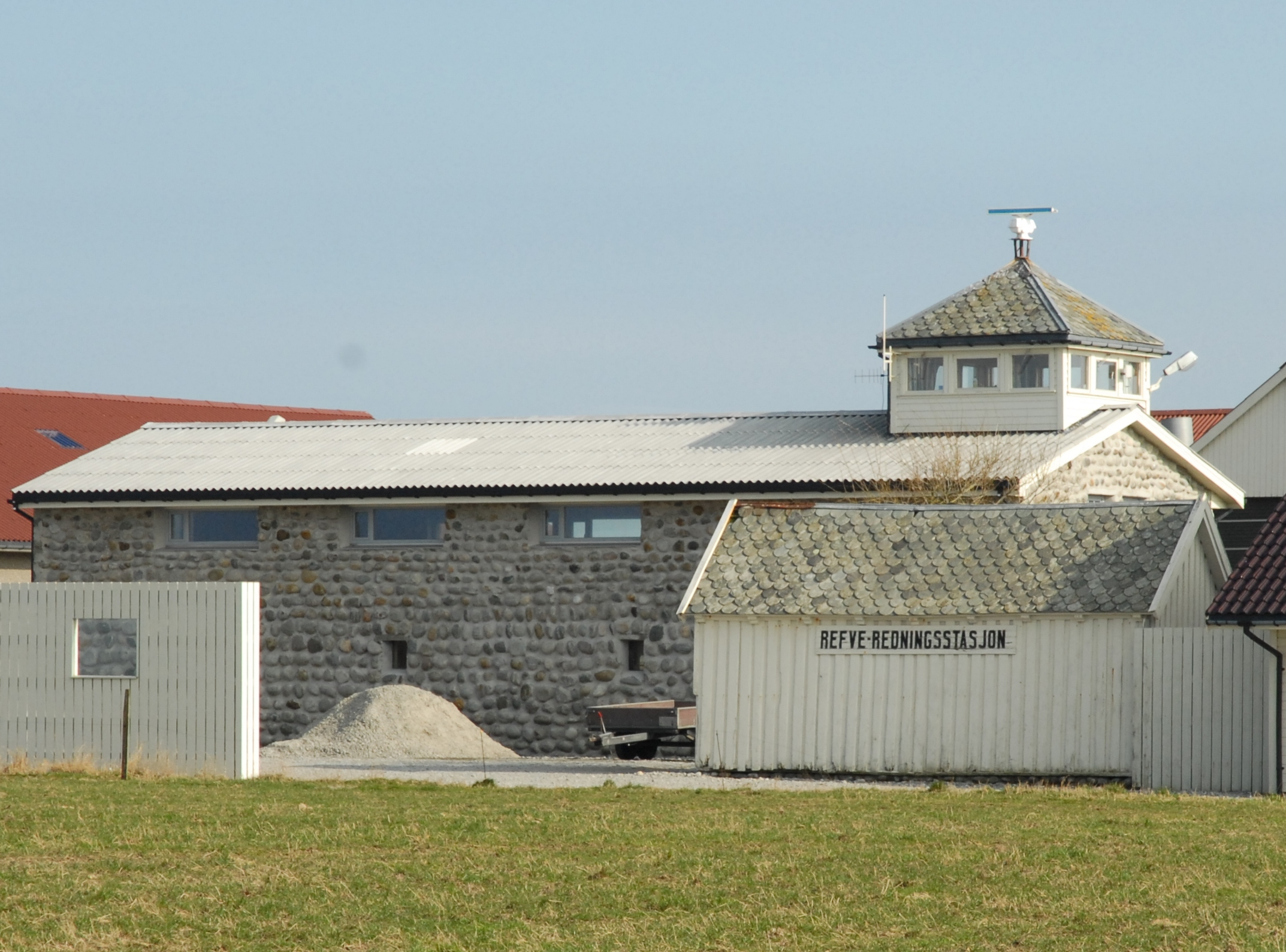
"Refve Redningsstasjon" ("Reve rescue station") at Reve, Klepp, Norway. Credit: Egil

== Wrecks ==
The reef has been the scene of many shipwrecks along the harsh Jær coast. In his book «Skipsforlis rundt Jæren» (lit. 'Shipwreck around Jæren'), Erik Bakkevig writes of 394 shipwrecks along the Jæren coast over the years.

The Norwegian cargo ship MS Knute Nelson sank at Jærens rev on 27 September 1944, together with two other ships in the same Axis forces convoy, which encountered a French-laid minefield.

== Rescue station ==
A rescue station was established here in 1852, and remained in operation until 1993.
