= Bryne =

Town in Rogaland, Norway

- Town/City
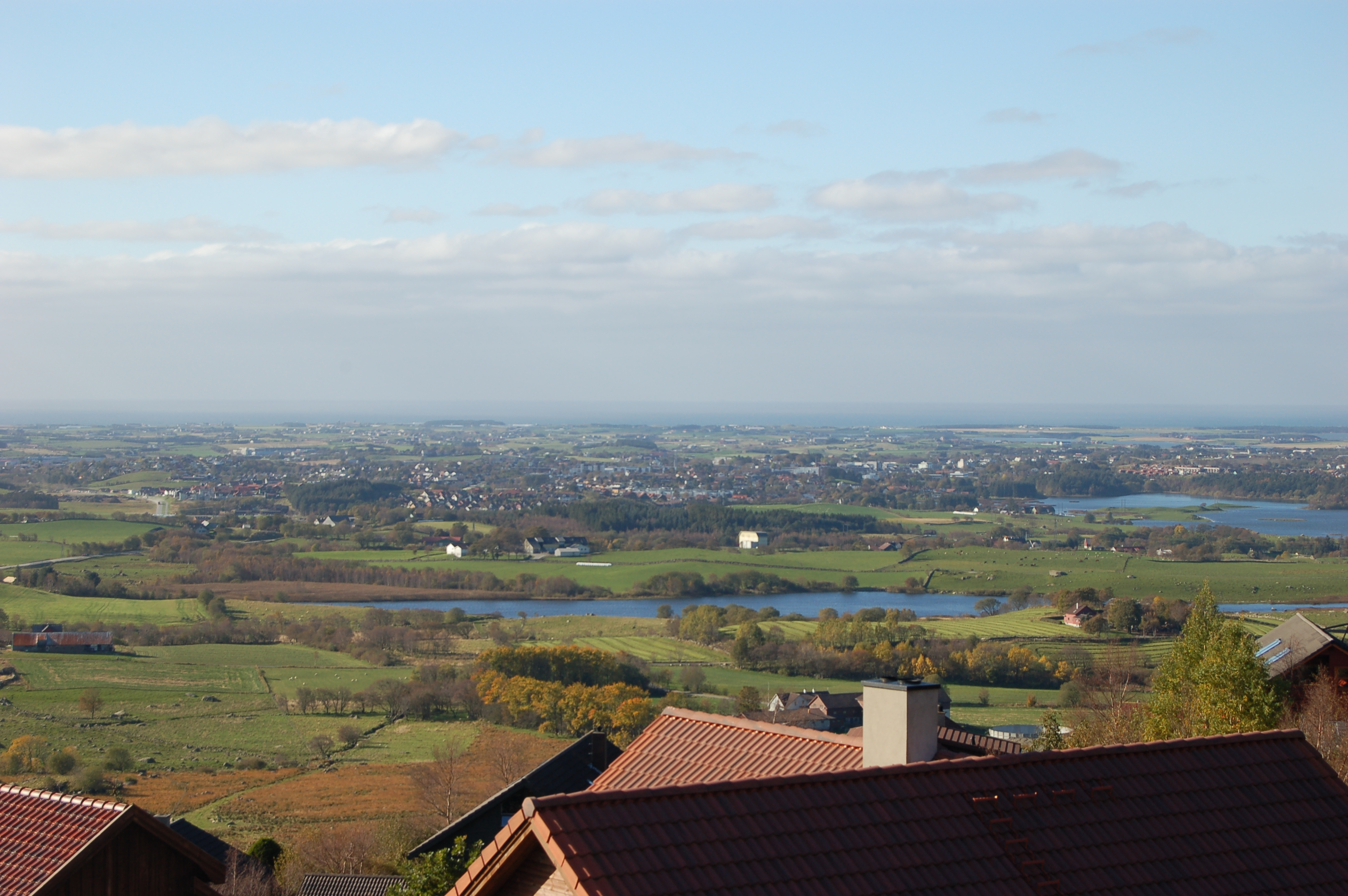
- View of Bryne from Lyefjell in Time, Rogaland
- Interactive map of Bryne
- Coordinates: 58.73521°N 5.65256°E
- Country: Norway
- Region: Western Norway
- County: Rogaland
- District: Jæren
- Municipality: Time (and Klepp)
- Established as
- Town (By): 2001

Area
  - Total: 5.7 km^{2} (2.2 sq mi)
- Elevation: 28 m (92 ft)

Population (2025)
  - Total: 13,459
  - Density: 2,361/km^{2} (6,110/sq mi)
- Demonym: Brynebu
- Time zone: UTC+01:00 (CET)
  - Summer (DST): UTC+02:00 (CEST)
- Post Code: 4340 Bryne

Bryne (Norwegian pronunciation: [ˈbrỳːnə], locally [ˈbʁỳːnə]) is a town in Time Municipality (and Klepp Municipality) in Rogaland county, Norway. The town is the administrative centre of the municipality of Time.

Bryne is located on the southern shores of the lake Frøylandsvatnet, about 30 minutes south of the city of Stavanger by train. The 5.7-square-kilometre (1,400-acre) town has a population (2025) of 13,459 and a population density of 2,361 inhabitants per square kilometre (6,110/sq mi). The town's urban area crosses over the municipal border to Klepp Municipality, with 1.21 square kilometres (300 acres) and 2,161 residents living in the neighboring municipality.

== History ==
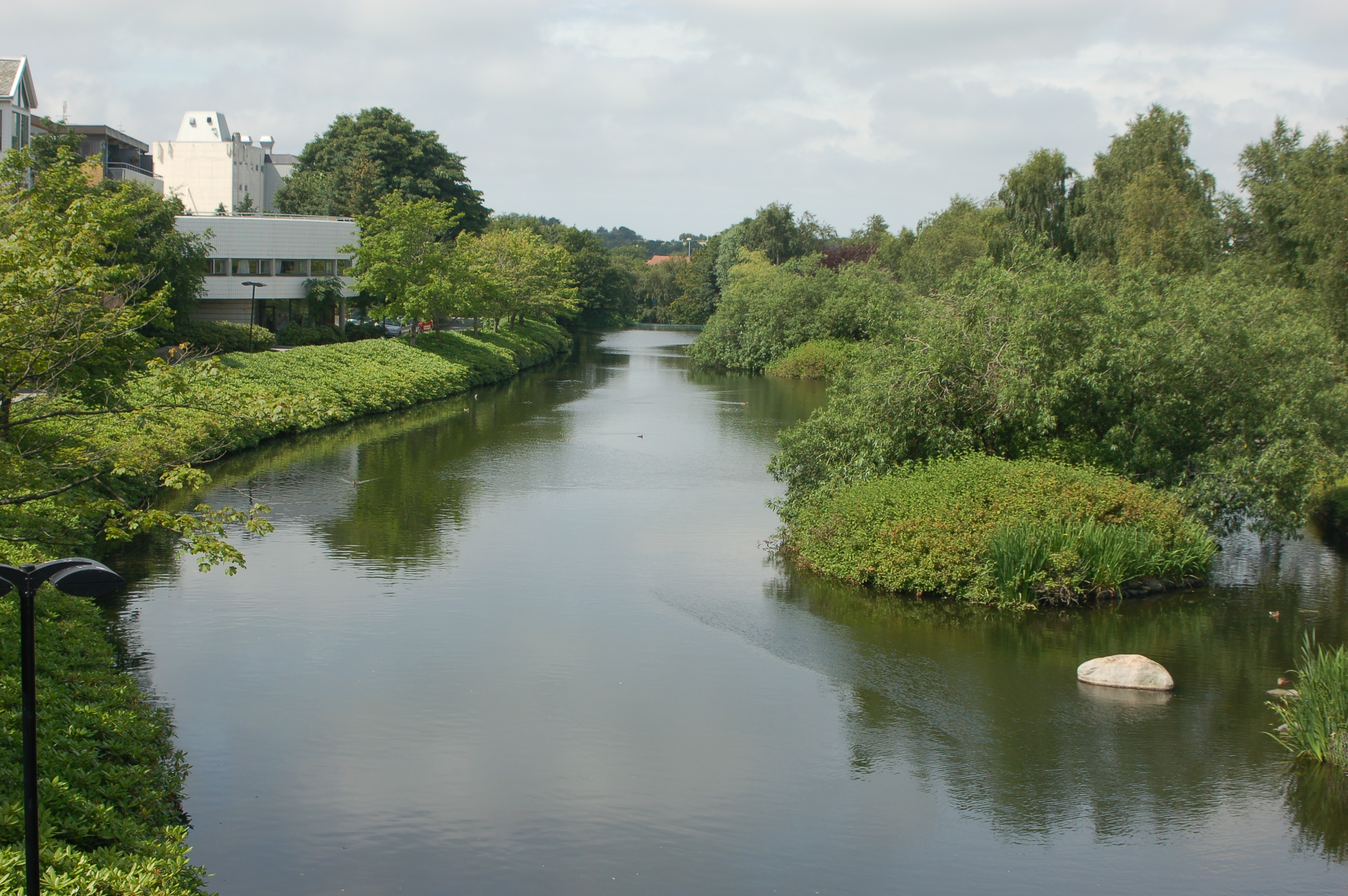
Mølledammen, Bryne

The village of Bryne was founded as Thime Stasjon, since this was the location of the Thime Station along the Jærbanen railroad going from Stavanger to Egersund. The small village, which grew up around an old farm of the same name (Time parish farm #1), was one of many popping up around the new stations on the railroad that was completed in 1878. A new chapel was soon built, as well as a store, a wool-processing factory and a dairy farm.

Several industries related to agriculture also emerged, producing ploughs, mowers and harvesting equipment. Many years later in 1949, the first excavator in Europe with complete hydraulic transmission of power, the Brøyt, was introduced by the two brothers Kristian and Ingebret Søyland. Also the company Tralfa developed the world's first spray-paint robot. Today, Tralfa is part of ABB.

Gradually, Bryne developed into a regional education center, with a dairy school established in 1906, the National Grammar School (Rogaland Landsgymnas) in 1924, and later a vocational school was also established. In 1921, the name of Thime Station was changed to Bryne by referendum. Bryne has since grown rapidly to become Jæren's most densely populated rural area and a regional trade center. On 1 January 2001, the municipality granted Bryne town status, the 49th largest settlement in Norway at the time.

== Shopping ==
Bryne has three shopping malls. They are Torgsenteret, Brynetorget, and M44 which is the newest and second largest in Rogaland. There is also a shopping street called Storgata ("Big Street") where there are several clothing shops, book shops, and sports wear shops, including special designer clothes shops that sell wares that can only be found in here.

== Culture ==
=== Churches ===
Bryne Church is located in the centre of the town and Time Church is located 1 kilometre (0.62 mi) east of the town.

=== Fritz Røed Park ===
The Fritz Røed Park was officially opened 1 October 2004. It is a collection of sculptures made by the sculptor Fritz Røed, who was born in Bryne. The sculptures are all placed in and around the river which flows through the park.

=== Garborg Centre ===
The Garborg Centre (Norwegian: "Nasjonalt Garborgsenter") opened in 2012. It is a museum and educational centre dedicated to the author couple Arne Garborg and Hulda Garborg. It aims to encourage people's interest for the ideas and visions of the two authors. The centre will encourage visitors to take a more active part in today's society, and inspire them to read and develop their own creativity.

=== Bryne Mølle ===
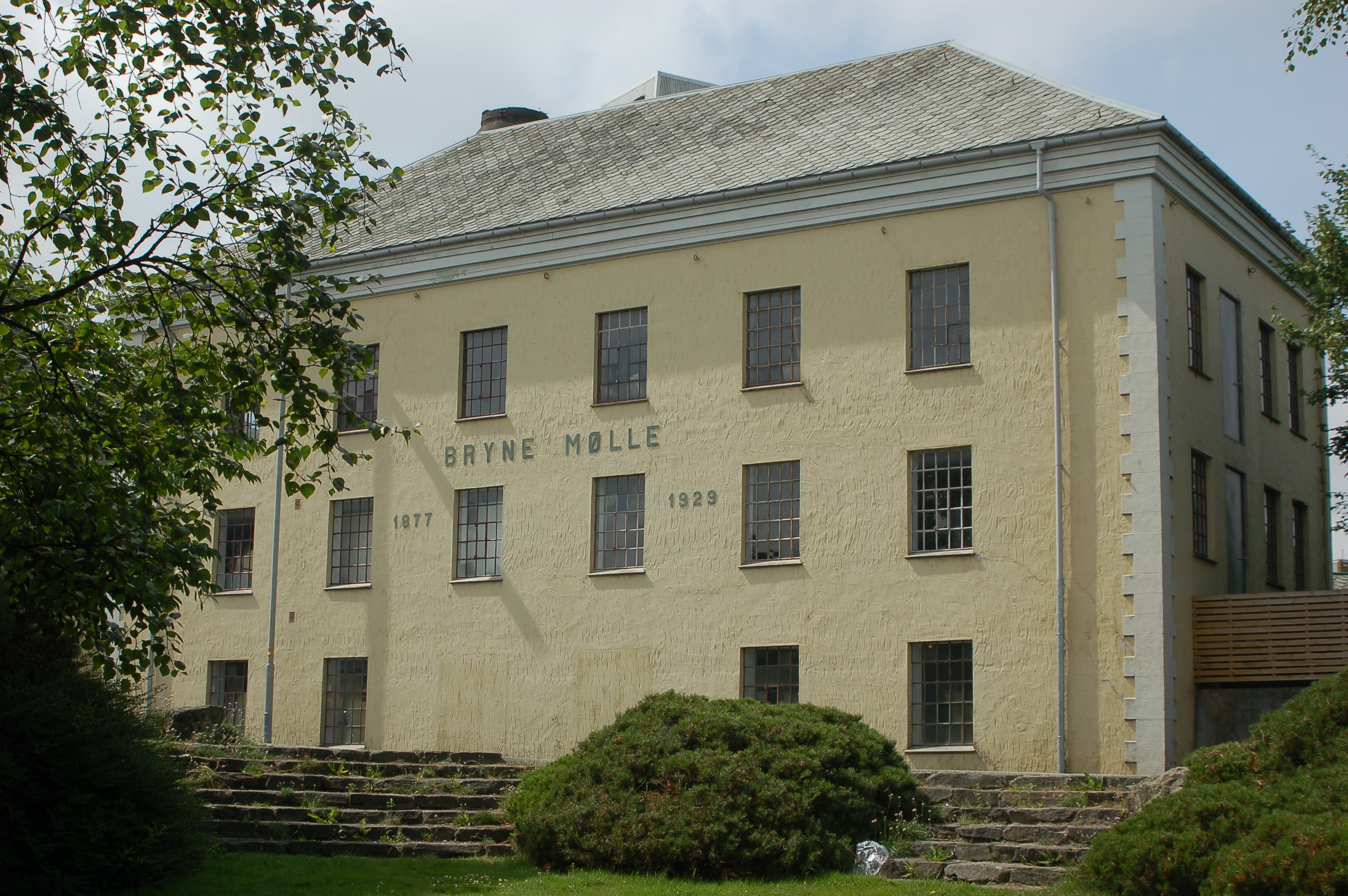
Bryne Mølle

Bryne Mølle (Bryne Mill) is an old mill now used for concerts and art exhibitions. The original mill burnt down in 1928. Today's building is dated from 1929. Ranglerock Festival is an annual rockfestival that has been arranged in there since 2005.

=== Kaizers Orchestra ===
The rock band Kaizers Orchestra originated in Bergen. The two founders of the band, vocalist Janove Ottesen and guitarist Geir Zahl are from Bryne.

== Sport ==
Bryne FK played in the Norwegian premier league from 1976 to 1988, and from 2000 to 2003, and now plays in 1. divisjon, the second tier of Norwegian football. In 1987 the team won the National Football Cup and reached the final again in 2001.

Bryne is the childhood home of renowned striker Erling Braut Haaland, where he grew up and learned to play football.

The football clubs Kåsen IL and Rosseland BK are also based in Bryne.

Bryne also has a karate club. The club has produced both national victories and international victories. It is among the biggest karate clubs in Norway.

== See also ==
- List of towns and cities in Norway
