= Kvernaland =

Village in Klepp Municipality, Norway

Kvernaland Orstad / Frøyland
- Village
- Interactive map of Kvernaland
- Coordinates: 58.77067°N 5.72618°E
- Country: Norway
- Region: Western Norway
- County: Rogaland
- District: Jæren
- Municipalities: Klepp, Time, Sandnes

Area
  - Total: 4.27 km^{2} (1.65 sq mi)
- Elevation: 36 m (118 ft)

Population (2019)
  - Total: 7,358
  - Density: 1,723/km^{2} (4,460/sq mi)
- Time zone: UTC+01:00 (CET)
  - Summer (DST): UTC+02:00 (CEST)
- Post Code: 4355 Kvernaland

Kvernaland is an amalgamation of villages in Rogaland county, Norway. The village area is located along the north end of the lake Frøylandsvatnet and it is located in both Klepp Municipality and Time Municipality (and a very small part extends into Sandnes Municipality as well). The eastern part of the village (in Klepp Municipality) is also known as Orstad and the western part of the village (in Time Municipality) is known as Frøyland or simply as Kvernaland. The village of Klepp stasjon lies just southwest of the village on the west side of the lake and the small village of Foss Eikjeland lies just north of the village, along the river Figgjo.

The 4.55-square-kilometre (1,120-acre) village has a population (2025) of 8,103 which gives the area a population density of 1,781 inhabitants per square kilometre (4,610/sq mi). About 2.76-square-kilometre (680-acre) of the village is located in Klepp Municipality and that part has 4,450 residents. There are 3,611 residents in the 1.35-square-kilometre (330-acre) part located in Time Municipality. There is also a very small part of Kvernaland (0.44 square kilometres or 110 acres) located in Sandnes Municipality with 42 residents.

Kvernaland is home to several factories, mainly producing equipment for agriculture. The largest is Kverneland Group, the world's largest manufacturer of ploughing and agricultural equipment. The Time Bygdemuseum (lit. 'Time Municipality museum') is also located in Kvernaland. Their football club is called Frøyland IL. The Øksnevadporten Station, located on the Jæren railway line, is located in Orstad.

Kvernaland is also a parish within the Church of Norway. It is unique in Norway in that the parish crosses municipal boundaries. The Frøyland og Orstad Church is located in Orstad, but it serves the whole village area on both sides of the municipal border.
