= Den norske los =

Norwegian eight-volume book

Den norske los (lit. 'The Norwegian Pilot') is an eight-volume book published by the Norwegian Mapping and Cadastre Authority. It provides supplementary information to charts for shipping crew. The book is obligatory for all vessels required to register. The first volume covers general information, while the remaining volumes cover specific geographic areas.

Volume	Title
1	General information
2A	Swedish Border – Langesund
2B	Langesund – Jærens rev
3	Jærens rev – Stad
4	Stad – Rørvik
5	Rørvik – Lødingen and Andenes
6	Lødingen and Andenes – Grense Jakobselv
7	Svalbard and Jan Mayen
