= Kleppe =

Village in Klepp Municipality, Norway

- Village
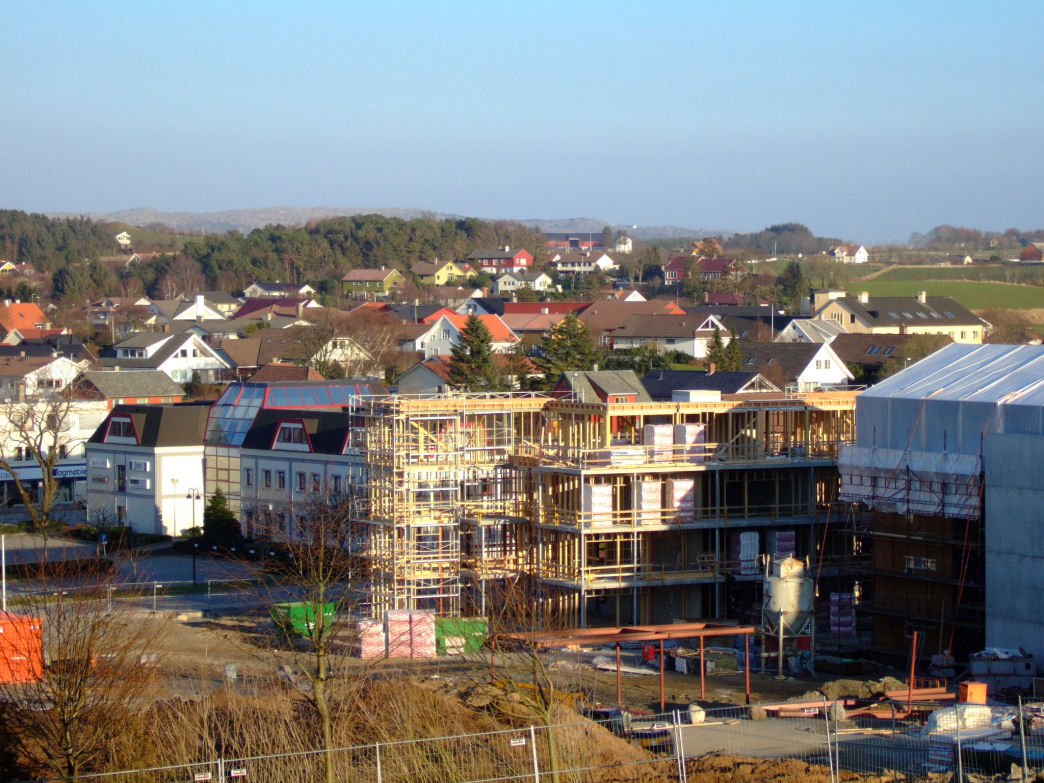
- View of the village
- Interactive map of Kleppe
- Coordinates: 58.77423°N 5.62936°E
- Country: Norway
- Region: Western Norway
- County: Rogaland
- District: Jæren
- Municipality: Klepp Municipality

Area
  - Total: 3.26 km^{2} (1.26 sq mi)
- Elevation: 41 m (135 ft)

Population (2025)
  - Total: 10,092
  - Density: 3,096/km^{2} (8,020/sq mi)
- Time zone: UTC+01:00 (CET)
  - Summer (DST): UTC+02:00 (CEST)
- Post Code: 4352 Kleppe

Kleppe is the administrative centre of Klepp Municipality in Rogaland county, Norway. The village is located about halfway between the lakes Orrevatnet and Frøylandsvatnet. The village of Bore lies about 3 kilometres (1.9 mi) northwest of Kleppe and the village of Klepp stasjon lies about 3 kilometres (1.9 mi) to the east. The town of Bryne lies about 5 kilometres (3.1 mi) to the south and the city of Sandnes is located about 12 kilometres (7.5 mi) to the northeast. Klepp Church is located in Kleppe.

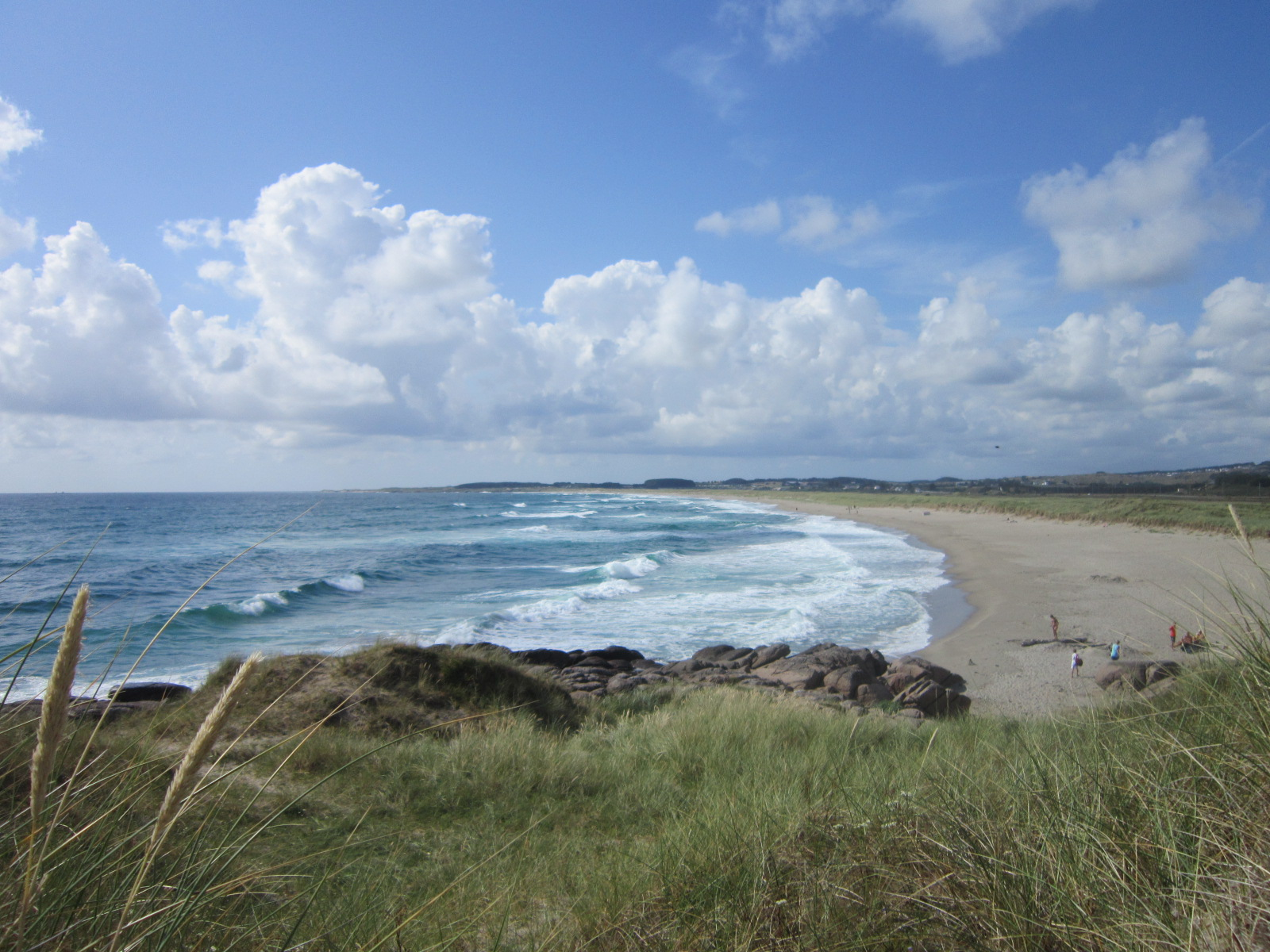
Borestrand, Kleppe, Norway

The population around Kleppe is growing rapidly, mostly in the form of suburban single-family homes, but also in the form of apartment blocks. The village of Kleppe and its suburb Verdalen have grown together to form one large urban area known as Kleppe or Kleppe/Verdalen. The 3.26-square-kilometre (810-acre) village has a population (2025) of 10,092 and a population density of 3,096 inhabitants per square kilometre (8,020/sq mi).

== Name ==
The name "Kleppe" comes from the Old Norse word "kleppr" which means "stone" or "hill".
