= Kleppe (disambiguation) =

Kleppe can refer to:

== People ==
- Johan Kleppe (born 1928), Norwegian veterinarian and politician for the Liberal Party
- Karl K. Kleppe (1877–1959), Norwegian farmer and politician for the Liberal Party
- Per Kleppe (born 1923), Norwegian economist and politician for the Labour Party
- Thomas S. Kleppe (1919–2007), US politician who served as the Representative from North Dakota
- Vidar Kleppe (born 1963), Member of Parliament in Norway and deputy leader of the Progress Party

== Places ==
- Kleppe, a village in Klepp Municipality in Rogaland county, Norway
- Kleppe (Orpe), a river of North Rhine-Westphalia and of Hesse, Germany, tributary of the Orpe

== Other ==
- Kleppe v. New Mexico, a 1976 decision of the U.S. Supreme Court

== See also ==
- Klepp (disambiguation)
