= Frøyland IL =

Norwegian football club

- Full name: Frøyland Idrettslag
- Founded: 14 November 1931
- Ground: Frøyland stadion, Kvernaland; Frøyhallen (indoor)
- League: Fourth Division
- 2024: 4th

Frøyland Idrettslag is a Norwegian multi-sports club from Kvernaland in Rogaland county, Norway. The village area lies in both Klepp Municipality and Time Municipality. The club has sections for association football, team handball, floorball, athletics, gymnastics and orienteering.

The club was founded in 1931 as Kverneland AIL, being members of Arbeidernes Idrettsforbund. In 1939, the club applied for municipal backing to buy a lot for a sports field, and agreed to change their name to the "politically neutral" Frøyland IL in this endeavour. The first sport was boxing, and other sport codes that were practised but later discontinued include cycling, Nordic skiing, speed skating and bandy. The sports field was opened in 1948. The team colours are white and black.

The men's football team currently plays in the Fourth Division, the fifth tier of football in Norway. The team had stints in the Third Division from 2003 to 2010 and 2012 to 2016.

The team reached the first round of the cup in 2004, 2006, 2009, 2010, 2016 and 2019.

Marius Lode started his career in Frøyland IL, and Ragnvald Soma has played for the club.

The women's team currently plays in the Third Division.
