= Frøylandsvatnet =

Lake in Time/Klepp, Norway

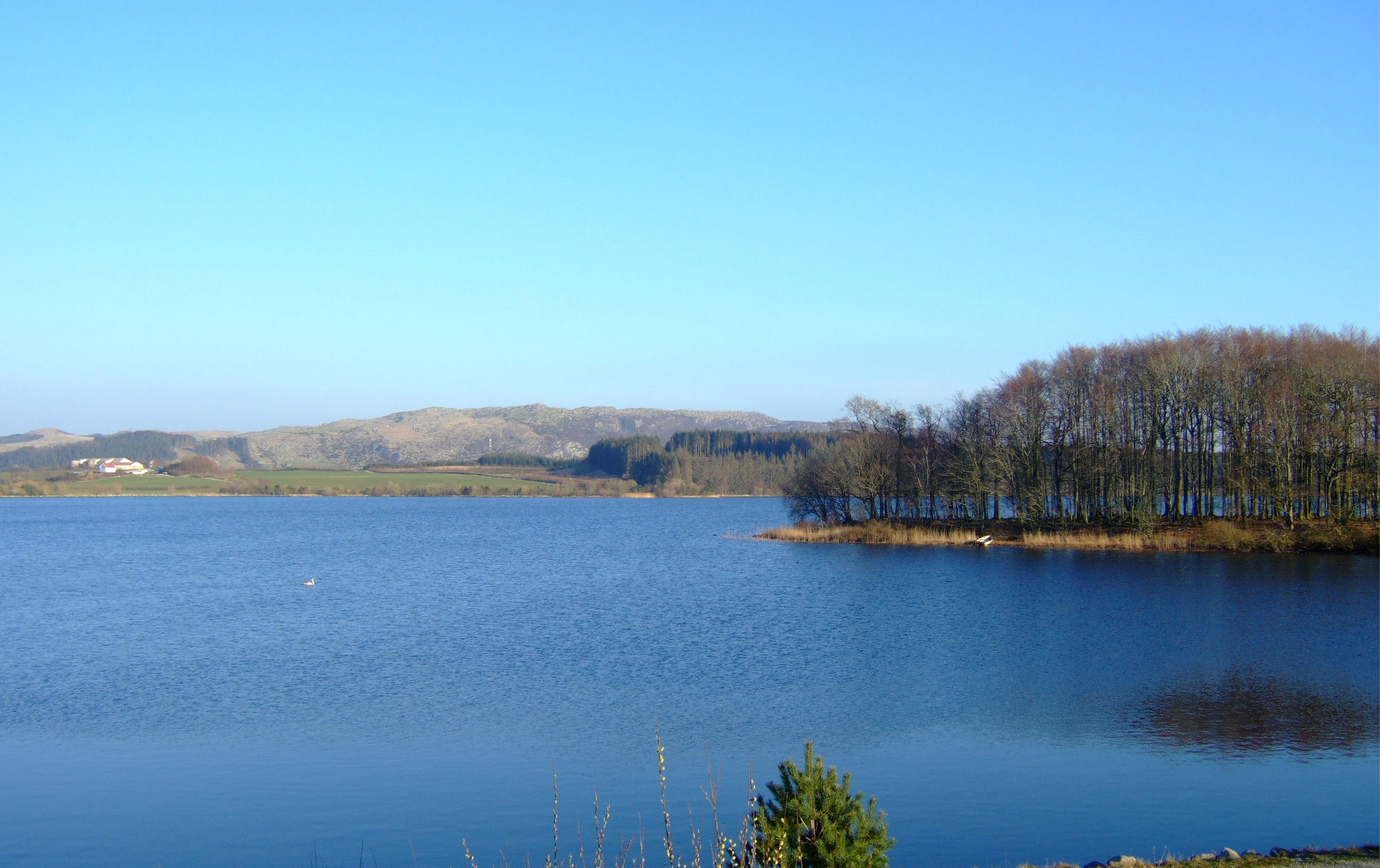
- Interactive map of Frøylandsvatnet
- Location: Klepp and Time, Rogaland
- Coordinates: 58.75619°N 5.68074°E
- Basin countries: Norway
- Max. length: 6 kilometres (3.7 mi)
- Max. width: 1.8 kilometres (1.1 mi)
- Surface area: 4.83 km^{2} (1.86 sq mi)
- Average depth: 5.5 metres (18 ft)
- Shore length^{1}: 24.1 kilometres (15.0 mi)
- Surface elevation: 24 metres (79 ft)
- References: NVE
- ^{1} Shore length is not a well-defined measure.

Frøylandsvatnet is a lake in Rogaland county, Norway. The 4.83-square-kilometre (1.86 sq mi) lake is located in the district of Jæren. It forms part of the boundary line between Klepp Municipality and Time Municipality. The lake is quite shallow, with an average depth of 5.5 metres (18 ft).

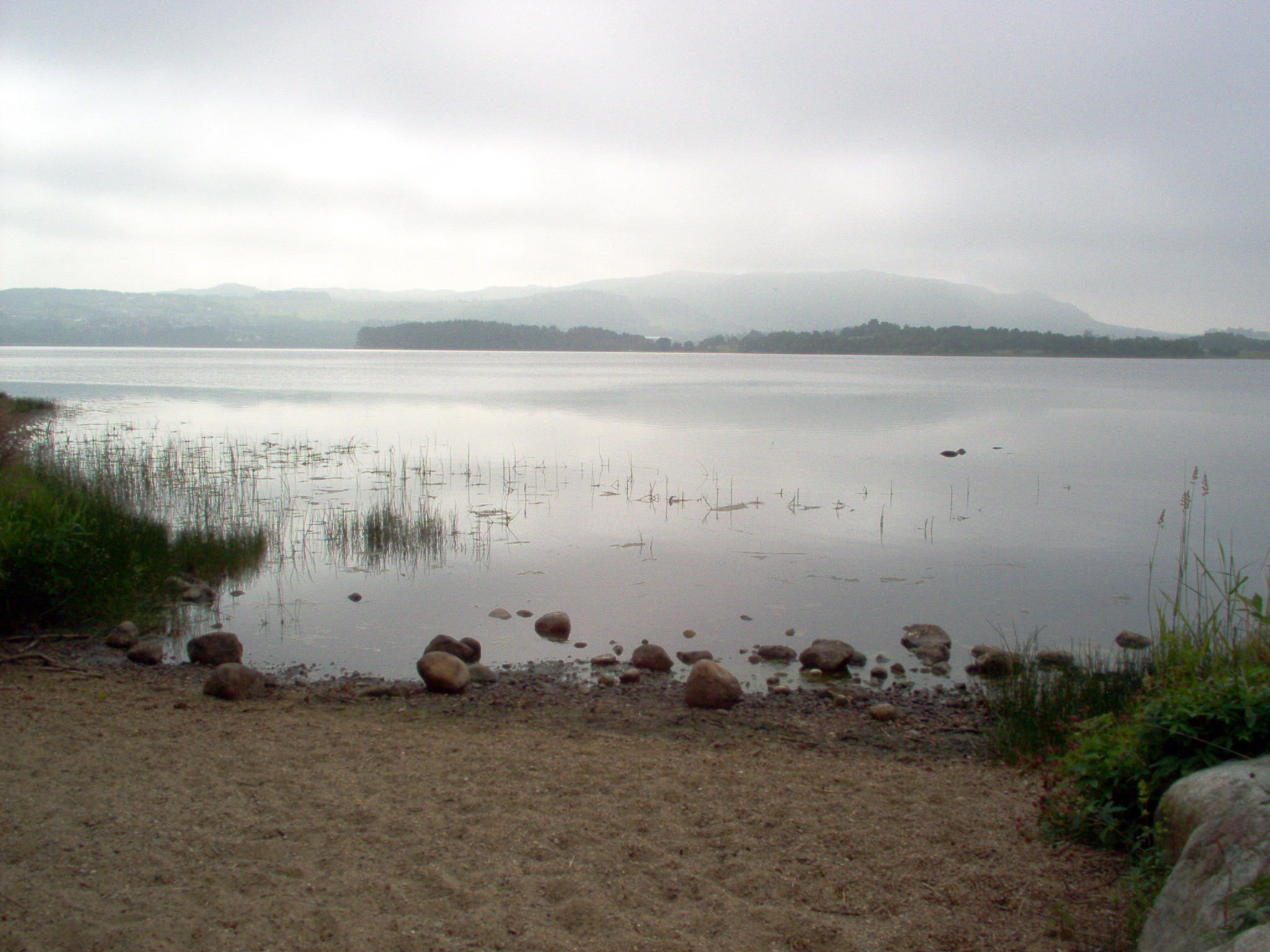
Frøylandsvatnet

The town of Bryne is located at the south end of the lake. The villages of Klepp stasjon, Orstad, and Kvernaland are all located around the northern end of the lake. The origin of the name is from the Norse god Frey.

== Environmental issues ==
The lake is located in an area with very intensive agriculture. Early in the 1980s, the lake was identified as being one of the worst cases of eutrophication in Norway. Algal bloom was a widespread problem, and there were cases reported of poisonous algae causing cattle to die from drinking the water.

The release of substances containing nitrogen and phosphorus has since been reduced, but large collections of sediment in the shallow lake cause the problems to decline rather slowly.

== See also ==
- List of lakes in Norway
