= Frøyland og Orstad Church =

Church in Rogaland, Norway

- Frøyland og Orstad kyrkje
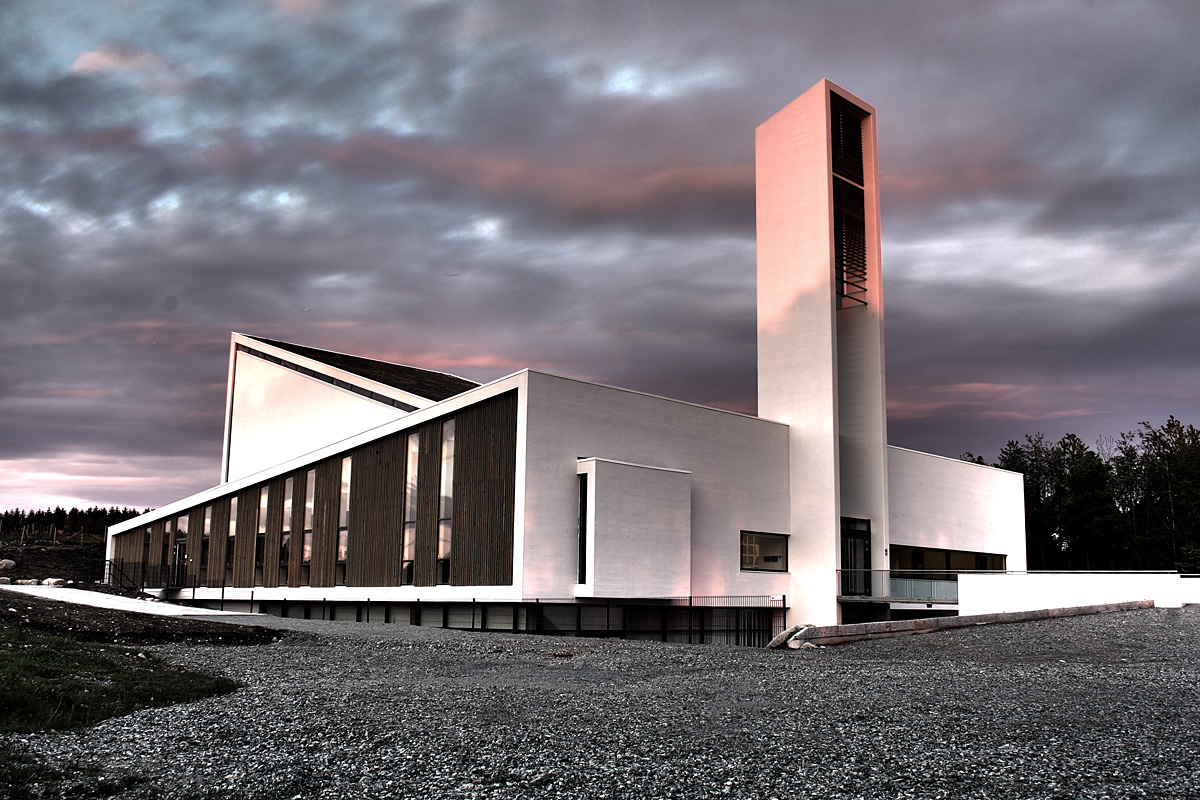
- View of the church
- Frøyland og Orstad Church
- 58.78761°N 05.720431°E
- Location: Klepp Municipality, Rogaland
- Country: Norway
- Denomination: Church of Norway
- Churchmanship: Evangelical Lutheran

History
- Status: Parish church
- Founded: 2008
- Consecrated: 14 Dec 2008

Architecture
- Functional status: Active
- Architect: LINK arkitektur
- Architectural type: Rectangular
- Completed: 2008 (18 years ago)

Specifications
- Capacity: 630
- Materials: Concrete

Administration
- Diocese: Stavanger bispedømme
- Deanery: Jæren prosti
- Parish: Frøyland og Orstad

Frøyland og Orstad Church (Norwegian: Frøyland og Orstad kyrkje) is a parish church of the Church of Norway in Klepp Municipality in Rogaland county, Norway. It is located in the village of Orstad. It is the church for the Frøyland og Orstad parish which is part of the Jæren prosti (deanery) in the Diocese of Stavanger. This parish is unique in Norway since it serves areas in two municipalities: Klepp and Time, encompassing the whole Kvernaland area.

The white, concrete church was built in a rectangular style in 2008 using designs by the architects René de Groth, Erik Thesen, and Kolbjørn Jensen who are from the firm LINK signatur. The church seats about 630 people.

The church was consecrated on 14 December 2008. The church cost 62.5 million kr. The church is the first church in the Church of Norway to have a baptismal pool in addition to a baptismal font.

== See also ==
- List of churches in Rogaland
