= Klepp stasjon =

Village in Klepp Municipality, Norway

- Village
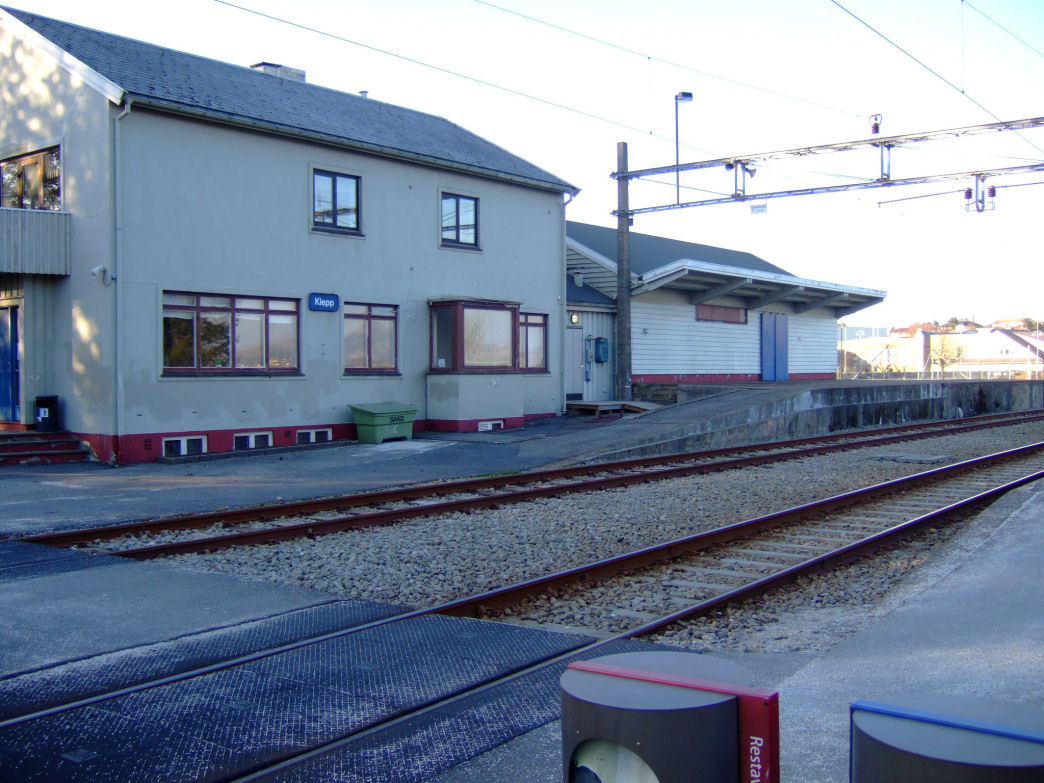
- View of the village railway station
- Interactive map of Klepp stasjon
- Coordinates: 58.7728°N 5.67728°E
- Country: Norway
- Region: Western Norway
- County: Rogaland
- District: Jæren
- Municipality: Klepp Municipality
- Elevation: 29 m (95 ft)
- Time zone: UTC+01:00 (CET)
  - Summer (DST): UTC+02:00 (CEST)
- Post Code: 4353 Klepp stasjon

Klepp stasjon is a village in Klepp Municipality in Rogaland county, Norway, on the lakeshore of Frøylandsvatnet, about 3 kilometres (1.9 mi) east of the village of Kleppe and 2 kilometres (1.2 mi) southwest of Orstad.

== Name ==
The village is named after the Klepp railway station on the Jæren Line. When the line was constructed in 1878, Kleppe was somewhat offset from its path, so the station serving it was placed east of the village rather than in it. Thereafter, this village (lit. 'Klepp Station') grew up around it. Sometimes the name is shortened to simply Klepp, but that is not an officially approved name for the village.
