= Feistein Lighthouse =

Coastal lighthouse in Rogaland, Norway

Feistein Lighthouse Feistein fyrstasjon
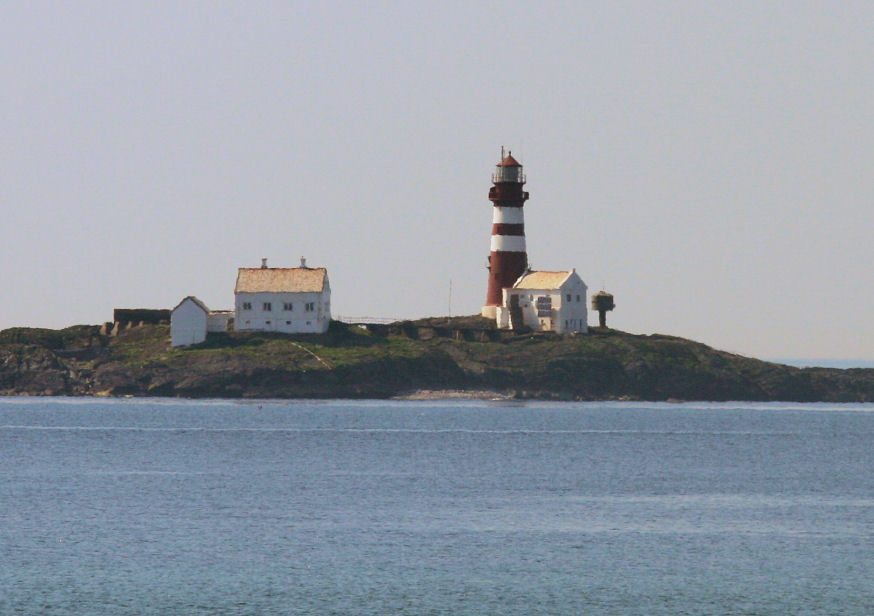
- View of Feistein Lighthouse
- Location: Rogaland, Norway
- Coordinates: 58°49′34″N 5°30′19″E

Tower
- Constructed: 1859
- Foundation: Concrete
- Construction: Cast iron tower
- Automated: 1988
- Height: 26 m (85 ft)
- Shape: Tapered cylindrical tower
- Markings: Red tower with two horizontal, white bands in the higher part
- Operator: Klepp Kommune
- Heritage: cultural heritage preservation in Norway
- Racon: T

Light
- Focal height: 34 m (112 ft)
- Intensity: 2,430,000 candela
- Range: 17 nmi (31 km; 20 mi) (white), 10 nmi (19 km; 12 mi) (red)
- Characteristic: Fl(2) W 20s, Iso RG 6s
- Norway no.: 100000

Feistein Lighthouse (Norwegian: Feistein fyr) is a coastal lighthouse in Rogaland county, Norway. The lighthouse is located on a small island in Klepp Municipality, off the coast of Jæren. It was established in 1859, and automated in 1990.

The 26-metre (85 ft) tall cast iron tower sits atop a concrete base. The tower is painted red with two white stripes towards the top. The main light at the top sits at an elevation of 37 metres (121 ft) above sea level which emits two white flashes every 20 seconds. There is also a secondary light located 20.8 metres (68 ft) above sea level that emits a red or green isophase light (depending on direction) that is on for six seconds and then off for six seconds. The main light has an intensity of 2,430,000 candelas and it can be seen for up to 11.9 nautical miles (22.0 km; 13.7 mi). The secondary lights can be seen for slightly less distance. The lighthouse also emits a morse code "T" racon signal.

== See also ==
- Lighthouses in Norway
- List of lighthouses in Norway
