= Ranglerock Festival =

Annual music festival in Norway

Coordinates: 58°44′11″N 5°38′32″E

The Ranglerock Festival is an annual rock festival that takes place in the small town of Bryne, located on the west coast of Norway. Usually arranged at the end of July. The festival was first held at Hognestad in 2002, then being called the Hoggstock Festival. The second year around, the arrangement was moved to Bryne, and in 2006 the name was changed to the Ranglerock Festival. The two-day festival is held indoors, and the last couple of years it has attracted about 600-700 people. The Hoggstock Festival received much attention in the local media as it often used slogans protesting against food festivals being arranged in the same period.

== The festival line-ups ==
- 2002: Svenssen Supertrucker & his Jolly Fellows (plus guest appearances by Hassa's Incredible Didgeridoo Experience, Totkopf and more)
- 2003: Svenssen Supertruckers, Gravmar & the Gravediggers, Totkopf.
- 2004: Svendsen, Gravmar & the Gravediggers, Totkopf, Dead Bizons, Three Star Hotel.
- 2005: Mad Foxes, Gravmar & the Gravediggers, Totkopf, Dead Bizons, Mikabomb (J/UK), Ungdomskulen, Three Star Hotel, Svartmalt, Teeny Grownups.
- 2006: Svenssen, Gravmar & the Gravediggers, Dead Bizons, The Young Knives (UK), Ungdomskulen, Quasimojo, Mary Me Young, Stereo 21, Årabrot.
- 2007: Tønes, Ida Maria, Rockettothesky, Helldorado, eX-Girl (JPN), Hot Coke (FIN), Anssi8000 & Killing Butterflies, Svenssen, Three Star Hotel, Dead Bisons, Totkopf.
- 2008: Two Gallants (USA), The Good The Bad (DEN), Tønes, The Cheaters, Ungdomskulen, I Was a King, Gerilja, Pirate Love, Hovering Orville, Svenssen, Casiokids, Gravmar & The Gravediggers.
- 2009: Art Brut, Fjorden Baby, The Alexandria Quartet, Tønes, Svenssen, Lyd, Bart, Major Parkinson, Dead Bisons, Hovering Orville, The Chairs, Gravmar & The Gravediggers.
- 2010: Dag för Dag (USA/SWE), The Amazing (SWE), Mondo Generator (USA), Hy-Test (AUS), Jaako & Jay (FIN), Hovering Orville, Pelbo, Johnny Hancocks, Årabrot, Joddski, Bloody Beach, Goatfish, Death By Unga Bunga, Torstein Obrestad, Svenssen, Siesta.
- 2011: Vind i Gardhol, The Cubical (UK), Church of Misery (JPN), Razika, Odel, Casa Murilo, Norma Sass, Oslo Ess, Svenssen, Kriminell Kunst, Swamp Things, Gravmar & The Gravediggers.
- 2012: Jonas Alaska, Anja Elena Viken, Svenssen, She Keeps Bees (USA), Honningbarna, Hold Fast, Stein Torleif Bjella, Chrome Hill, Dalane Emoband, General Forsamling, The Captain & Me, Eye Emma Jedi, Skadne Krek.
- 2013: Two Gallants (USA), Svenska Kaputt (SWE), Geoff Berner (CAN), Hedvig Mollestad Trio, Hovering Orville, Billie Van, Svenssen, Tusmørke, Wunderkammer, Hvitmalt Gjerde, Heavy Heads, Tom Roger Aadland Trio
