= Kleppe (Orpe) =

River in Germany

Location
- Country: Germany
- States: North Rhine-Westphalia; Hesse

Physical characteristics
- Mouth
  - location: Orpe
  - coordinates: 51.4038°N 8.9207°E

Basin features
- Progression: Orpe→ Diemel→ Weser→ North Sea

Kleppe is a river of North Rhine-Westphalia and of Hesse, Germany. It is 8.3 km long and flows into the Orpe as a left tributary in Marsberg-Canstein.

== See also ==
- List of rivers of Hesse
- List of rivers of North Rhine-Westphalia
