= Klepp Station =

Railway station in Rogaland, Norway

Klepp Station Klepp stasjon
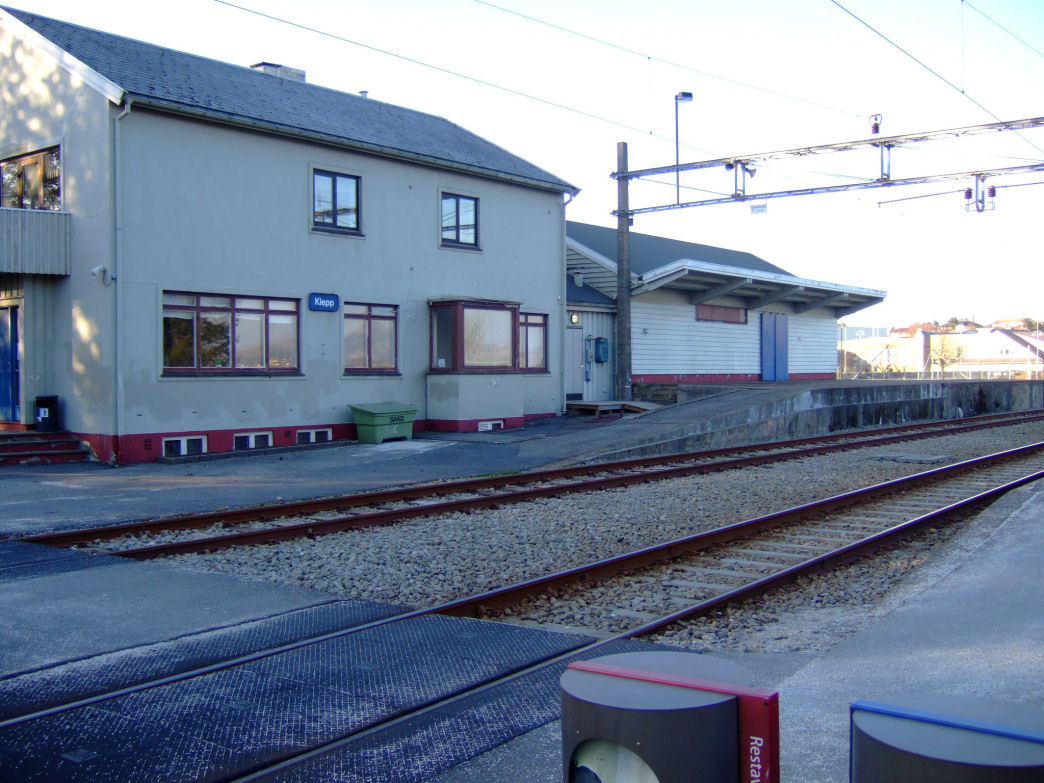
- View of the station

General information
- Location: Klepp stasjon, Klepp Municipality; Rogaland; Norway
- Coordinates: 58°46′22″N 05°40′45″E
- Owner: Bane NOR
- Operator: Go-Ahead Norge
- Line: Sørlandet Line
- Distance: 573.94 km (356.63 mi)
- Platforms: 2
- Connections: Bus

Construction
- Parking: 80 parking spaces

History
- Opened: 1878
Location

Klepp Station (Norwegian: Klepp stasjon) is a railway station in Klepp Municipality in Rogaland county, Norway. The station is located in the village of Klepp stasjon, about 3 kilometres (1.9 mi) east of the municipal centre of Kleppe. The station on the Sørlandet Line. The station is served by the Jæren Commuter Rail between Stavanger and Egersund. The station is 24.84 kilometers (15.43 mi) south of the city of Stavanger.

| Preceding station | Local trains | Following station |
|---|---|---|
| Øksnevadporten towards Stavanger | L5 Jæren Commuter Rail | Bryne towards Egersund |
