= Øksnevadporten Station =

Railway station in Klepp, Norway

Øksnavadporten Station Øksnavadporten stasjon
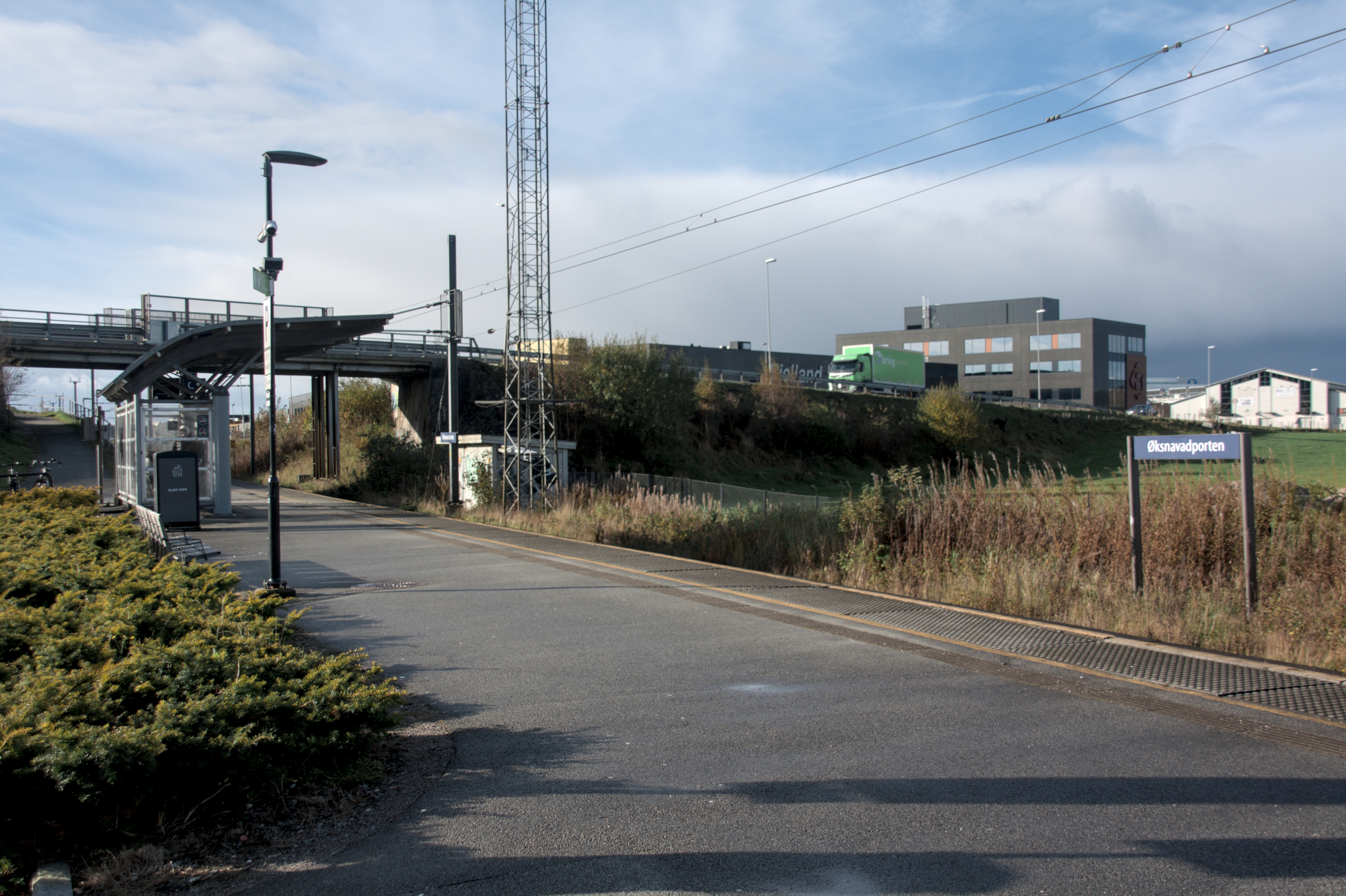

General information
- Location: Øksnavad, Klepp Municipality; Rogaland; Norway
- Coordinates: 58°47′13″N 05°42′04″E
- System: Railway station
- Owner: Bane NOR
- Operator: Go-Ahead Norge
- Line: Sørlandet Line
- Distance: 576.10 km (357.97 mi)
- Platforms: 1

Construction
- Parking: 20 parking spaces

History
- Opened: 1933
Location

Øksnavadporten Station (Norwegian: Øksnavadporten stasjon) is a railway station located in Øksnavad in Klepp Municipality in Rogaland county, Norway. The station is located on the Sørland Line. The station is served by the Jæren Commuter Rail between Stavanger and Egersund. The station is 22.42 kilometers (13.93 mi) south of the city of Stavanger.

Preceding station	Local trains	Following station
Ganddal towards Stavanger	L5 Jæren Commuter Rail	Klepp towards Egersund
