= Orpe =

River in Germany

Location
- Country: Germany
- State: North Rhine-Westphalia, Hesse

Physical characteristics
- Mouth
  - location: Diemel
  - coordinates: 51.5119°N 9.0044°E
- Length: 19.1 km (11.9 mi)

Basin features
- Progression: Diemel→ Weser→ North Sea

Orpe is a river of North Rhine-Westphalia and Hesse, Germany. It flows into the Diemel in Diemelstadt-Wrexen.

== See also ==
- List of rivers of Hesse
