= Klepp I Runestone =

Runestone

The Klepp I Runestone, listed as N 225 in the Rundata catalog, is one of two runestones from Klepp Municipality in Rogaland county, Norway. It is among the few Viking Age runestones that was raised as a memorial to a woman.

== Description ==
The Klepp I Runestone has three lines of runic text on two sides of the stone. The runic inscription ends with a cross, indicating that it dates from after the local conversion to Christianity, or the late 10th or early 11th century. The inscription provides an early example of the use of the name Kleppr, which means "rocky hill," for the town of Klepp. It has been suggested that the detailed description of the family relationships in the inscription may have been to document the inheritance of the estate of the deceased woman Ásgerðr. The details of the family ties indicate the different ways that Ásgerðr could inherit property and how it then could be divided among the living.

Although the runestone is classified as a Christian monument, Ásgerðr combines two name elements from Norse paganism: Ás, which refers to one of the Æsir, the main group of Norse gods, and the name of the goddess Gerðr, who was the wife of the god Freyr.

== Inscription ==
þurir : harþar:sunr : raisti : stain : þina : ¶ aft : oskarþi : kuon : sina : (t)u(t)ur : kunars (:)
Þórir {} Harðarsonr {} reisti {} stein {} þenna {} {} ept {} Ásgerði, {} kván {} sína, {} dóttur {} Gunnars, {}
Þórir Harðr's son raised this stone in memory of his wife Ásgerðr, daughter of Gunnarr

bruþur : halka : o : klabi +
bróður {} Helga {} á {} Kleppi. {}
(the) brother of Helgi of Kleppr.

== See also ==
- List of runestones
