= Klepp Church =

Church in Rogaland, Norway

- Klepp kyrkje
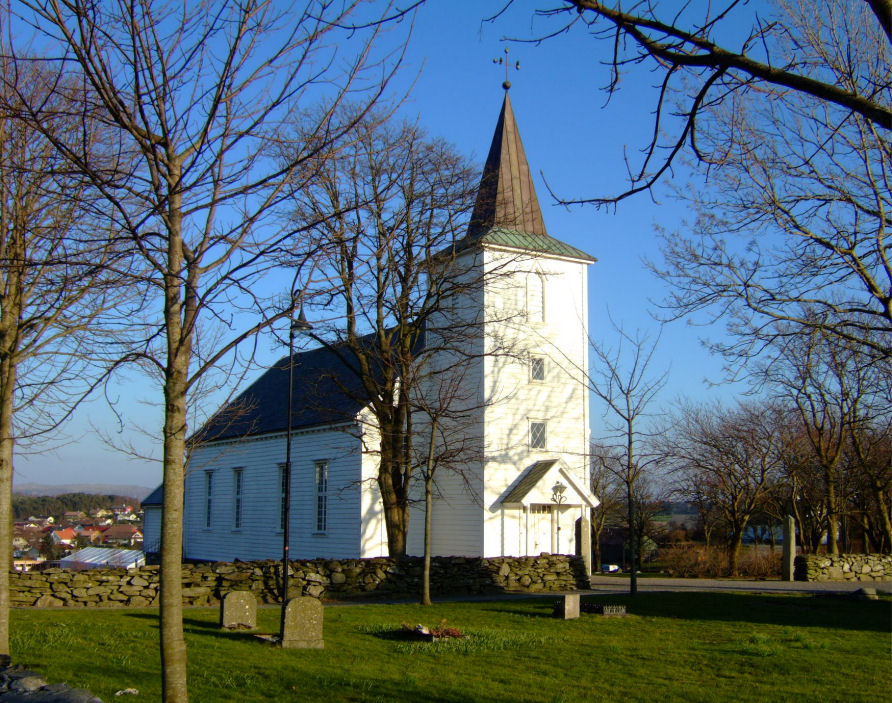
- View of the church
- Klepp Church
- 58.77334°N 05.624391°E
- Location: Klepp Municipality, Rogaland
- Country: Norway
- Denomination: Church of Norway
- Churchmanship: Evangelical Lutheran

History
- Status: Parish church
- Founded: 11th century

Architecture
- Functional status: Active
- Architect: Hans Linstow
- Architectural type: Long church
- Completed: 1846 (180 years ago)

Specifications
- Capacity: 280
- Materials: Wood

Administration
- Diocese: Stavanger bispedømme
- Deanery: Jæren prosti
- Parish: Klepp
- Norwegian Cultural Heritage Site
- Type: Church
- Status: Listed
- ID: 84792

Klepp Church (Norwegian: Klepp kyrkje) is a parish church of the Church of Norway in Klepp Municipality in Rogaland county, Norway. It is located in the village of Kleppe. It is the church for the Klepp parish which is part of the Jæren prosti (deanery) in the Diocese of Stavanger. The white, wooden church was built in a long church style in 1846 using designs by the architect Hans Linstow. The church seats about 280 people.

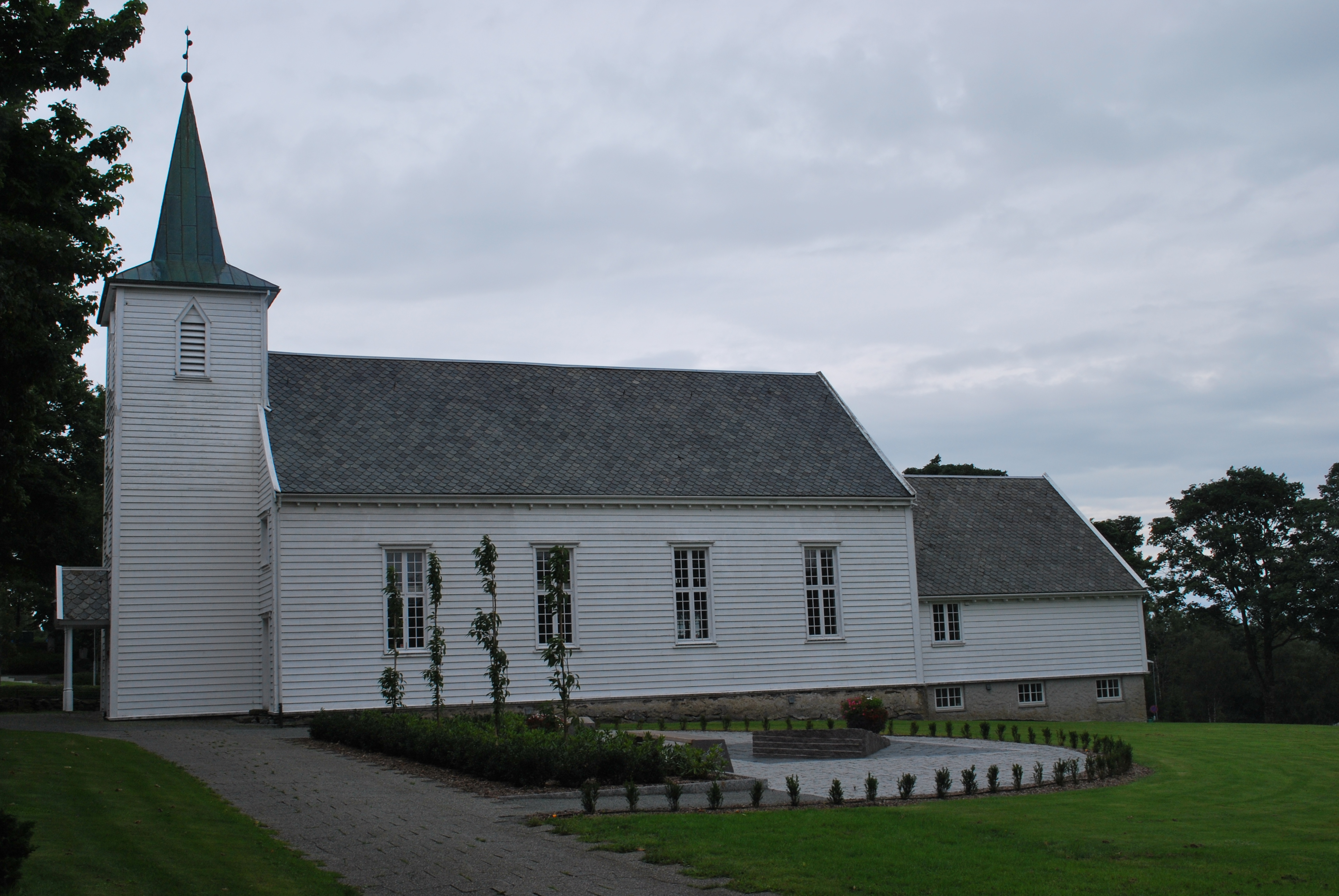
View of the church

== History ==
The earliest existing historical records of the church date back to the year 1280, but the church was not new then, it may have been built as early as the 11th century. The old church was likely a stave church. In 1646, the old church was torn down and from 1646 to 1648 a new timber-framed long church was constructed on the same site.

In 1814, this church served as an election church (Norwegian: valgkirke). Together with more than 300 other parish churches across Norway, it was a polling station for elections to the 1814 Norwegian Constituent Assembly which wrote the Constitution of Norway. This was Norway's first national elections. Each church parish was a constituency that elected people called "electors" who later met together in each county to elect the representatives for the assembly that was to meet at Eidsvoll Manor later that year.

In 1846, the old church was torn down and its foundation walls were removed. During the demolition, a carved stone in the foundation was found that had a runic inscription on it: Tore Hordsson reiste denne steinen etter Åsgjerd, kona si, dotter til Gunnar som var bror til Helge på Kleppe (English: Tore Hordsson placed this stone for Åsgjerd, his wife, daughter of Gunnar who was the brother of Helge of Kleppe.). This stone inscription was dated to the late 10th or 11th centuries which is thought to be when the church was first constructed.

After the demolition of the old church in 1846, a new church was built almost on the same site. It is possibly built slightly to the south of the old church site.

== See also ==
- List of churches in Rogaland
