= Bore, Norway =

Village in Klepp Municipality, Norway

Bore
- Village
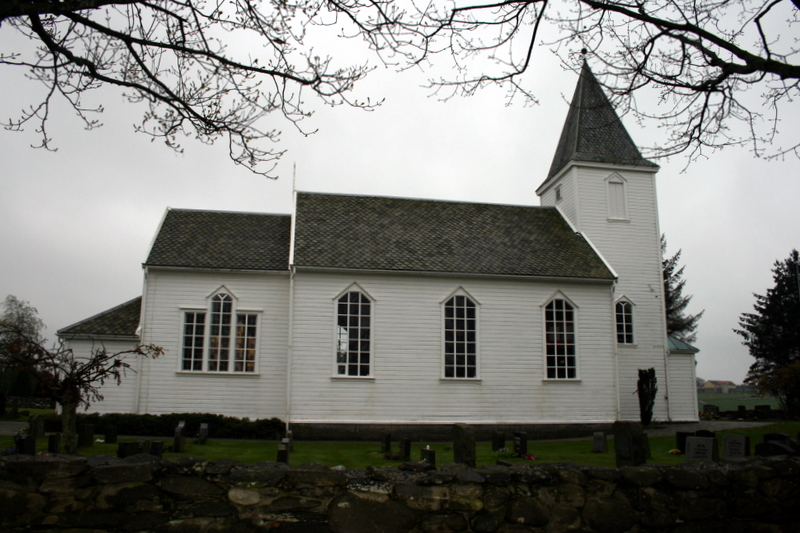
- View of the village church
- Interactive map of Bore
- Coordinates: 58.78866°N 5.58099°E
- Country: Norway
- Region: Western Norway
- County: Rogaland
- District: Jæren
- Municipality: Klepp Municipality
- Elevation: 31 m (102 ft)
- Time zone: UTC+01:00 (CET)
  - Summer (DST): UTC+02:00 (CEST)
- Post Code: 4352 Kleppe

Bore is a village in Klepp Municipality in Rogaland county, Norway. The village is located about 3 kilometres (1.9 mi) northwest of the municipal centre of Kleppe. The village lies between the river Figgjoelva, the lake Orrevatnet, and the seashore. Bore Church sits just north of the river, just outside of the village. The Bore area is well-known for its sandy beaches along the seashore.
