= Klepp Municipality =

Municipality in Rogaland, Norway

Klepp Municipality Klepp kommune
- Municipality
- Klep herred (historic name)
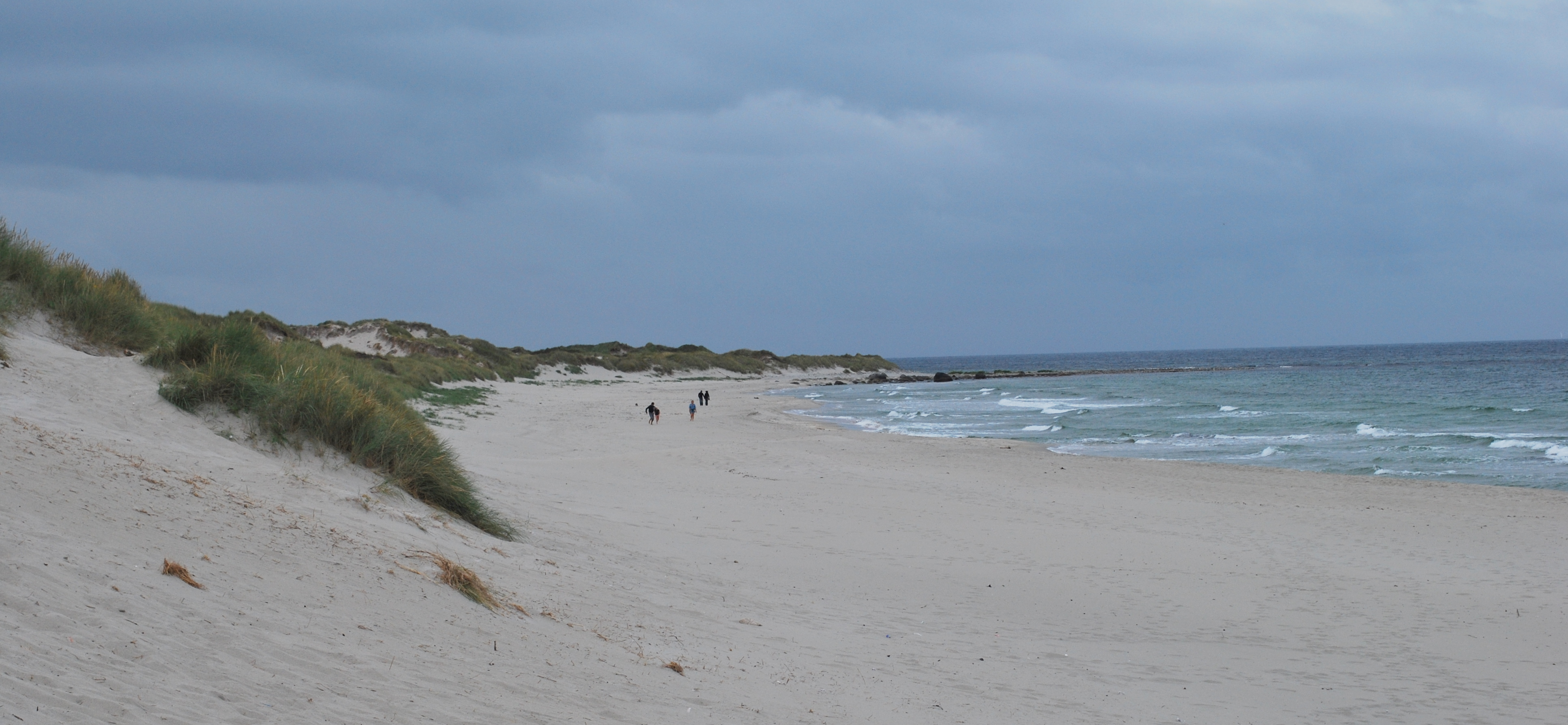
- View of the Orrestranda beach along the Klepp coast

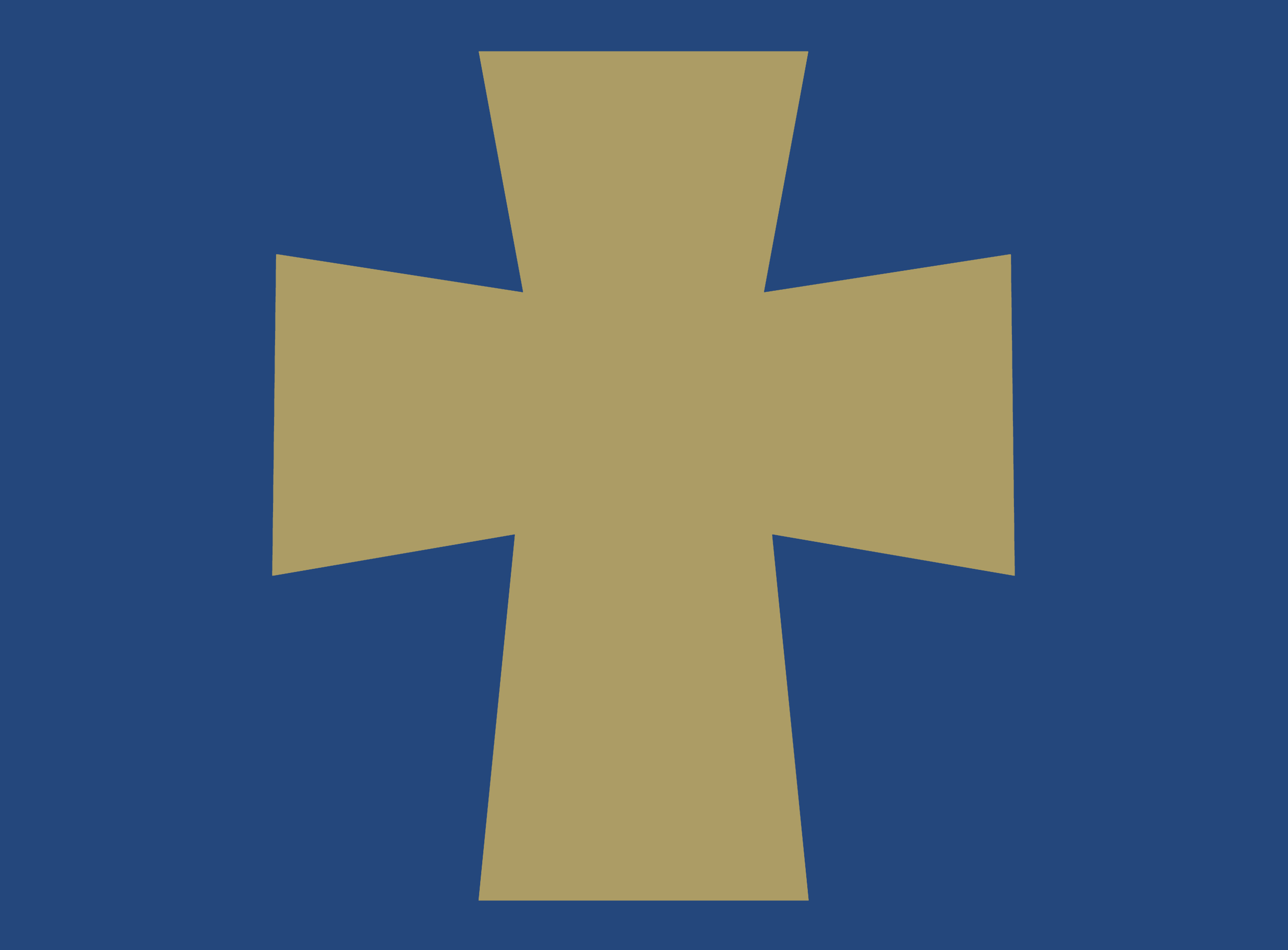
- Flag Coat of arms

- Rogaland within Norway

- Klepp within Rogaland
- Coordinates: 58°46′38″N 05°35′48″E
- Country: Norway
- County: Rogaland
- District: Jæren
- Established: 1 Jan 1838
  - Created as: Formannskapsdistrikt
- Administrative centre: Kleppe

Government
  - Mayor (2023): Kjetil Maudal (FrP)

Area
  - Total: 113.48 km^{2} (43.81 sq mi)
  - Land: 102.35 km^{2} (39.52 sq mi)
  - Water: 11.13 km^{2} (4.30 sq mi) 9.8%
  - Rank: #325 in Norway
- Highest elevation: 102.33 m (335.7 ft)

Population (2026)
  - Total: 21,444
  - Rank: #62 in Norway
  - Density: 189/km^{2} (490/sq mi)
  - Change (10 years): ▲ +13%
- Demonym: Kleppsbu

Official language
  - Norwegian form: Nynorsk
- Time zone: UTC+01:00 (CET)
  - Summer (DST): UTC+02:00 (CEST)
- ISO 3166 code: NO-1120
- Website: Official website

Klepp is a municipality in Rogaland county, Norway. It is located in the traditional district of Jæren. The administrative centre of the municipality is the village of Kleppe. Other villages in Klepp include Klepp stasjon, Orre, Orstad, Pollestad, Verdalen, and Voll. Klepp is a flat and open agricultural landscape. There are long stretches of sand beaches along the North Sea coastline in the west.

The 113.48-square-kilometre (43.81 sq mi) municipality is the 325th largest by area out of the 357 municipalities in Norway. Klepp Municipality is the 62nd most populous municipality in Norway with a population of 21,444. The municipality's population density is 189 inhabitants per square kilometre (490/sq mi) and its population has increased by 13% over the previous 10-year period. The population around Kleppe is growing rapidly, mostly in the form of suburban single-family homes, but also in the form of some apartment blocks. There is a shopping mall in Kleppe called Jærhagen.

== General information ==
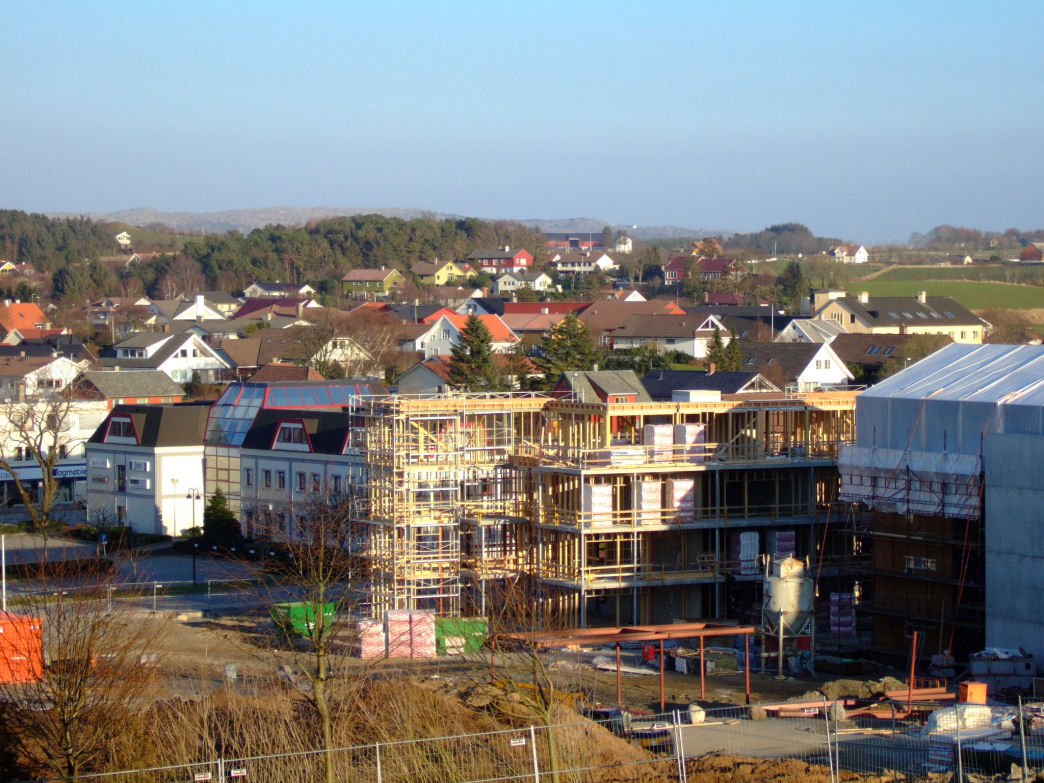
View of Kleppe

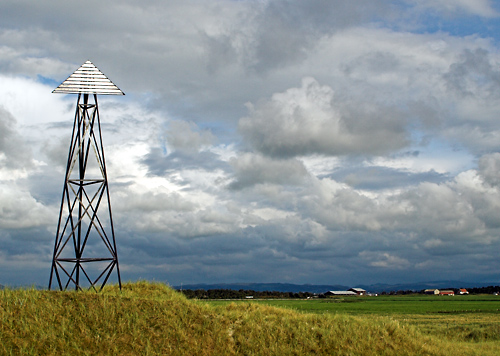
View of the agricultural landscape of Klepp

The old parish of Klep (later spelled Klepp) was established as a municipality on 1 January 1838 (see formannskapsdistrikt law). The boundaries of the municipality have not changed since that time.

=== Name ===
The municipality (originally the parish) is named after the old Klepp farm (Old Norse: Kleppi) since the first Klepp Church was built there. The name is the dative case of the word kleppr which means "rocky hill". The inscription on the Klepp I Runestone indicates that the name has been in use since the late 10th or early 11th century. Before 1912, the name was written "Klep".

=== Coat of arms ===
The coat of arms was granted on 18 February 1972. The official blazon is "Azure, a Cossack cross Or" (Norwegian: På blå botn ein svevande, utskrådd gul kross). This means the arms have a blue field (background) and the charge is a Cossack cross. The charge has a tincture of Or which means it is commonly colored yellow, but if it is made out of metal, then gold is used. The cross on the arms symbolizes the large stone cross at Krosshaug in Klepp. Krosshaug is a grave hill located near the site where the local thing met for centuries. The Old Norse word haugr means "mound", hence the name "kross-haug" is the cross-mound. The cross was considered a representative historic symbol for the municipality. The municipal flag has the same design as the coat of arms.

=== Churches ===
The Church of Norway has four parishes (sokn) within Klepp Municipality. It is part of the Jæren prosti (deanery) in the Diocese of Stavanger.

Churches in Klepp Municipality
Parish (sokn)	Church name	Location of the church	Year built
Bore	Bore Church	Bore	1891
Frøyland og Orstad**	Frøyland og Orstad Church	Orstad	2008
Klepp	Klepp Church	Kleppe	1846
Orre	Orre Church	Pollestad	1950
Orre	Old Orre Church	Orre	c. 1250
**Note: Frøyland og Orstad parish covers part of Klepp Municipality and part of Time Municipality.

== History ==
The earliest traces of population in the municipality have been dated to around 6000 BC. At that time, the land was covered by large oak woods. The large stone cross standing on the grave hill Krosshaug dates from around 1000 AD and is possibly the oldest in Norway. It is adjacent to Tinghaug, the site for a local Thing for many centuries during the Iron Age. Tinghaug probably acted as a site for the local court and assembly for many centuries.

== Population ==
Historical population

Year	Pop.	±% p.a.
1845	1,755	—
1855	2,034	+1.49%
1865	2,199	+0.78%
1875	2,491	+1.25%
1891	2,481	−0.03%
1900	2,637	+0.68%
1910	3,058	+1.49%

Year	Pop.	±% p.a.
1920	3,400	+1.07%
1930	3,807	+1.14%
1946	4,678	+1.30%
1951	4,973	+1.23%
1960	5,724	+1.57%
1970	8,547	+4.09%
1980	10,591	+2.17%

Year	Pop.	±% p.a.
1990	11,788	+1.08%
2000	13,789	+1.58%
2010	16,918	+2.07%
2020	19,588	+1.48%
2023	20,615	+1.72%

Source: Statistics Norway and Norwegian Historical Data Centre

== Geography ==
The municipality is located 25 kilometres (16 mi) south of the city of Stavanger. Hå Municipality is located to the south, Time Municipality is located to the south and east, Sola Municipality and Sandnes Municipality are located to the north. The coastline is agricultural and consists of, from south to north, the areas Orre, Reve, Bore and Sele.

The long Orrestranda beach, one of the longest sandy beaches in Norway, is in Klepp. The river Figgjoelva empties into the North Sea in Klepp. The small island of Feistein lies off shore and is the site of the Feistein Lighthouse. There are two large lakes in Klepp: Orrevatnet and Frøylandsvatnet. The highest point in the municipality is the 102.33-metre (335.7 ft) tall mountain Tinghaug. The Jærens rev reef lies just off the shore of Klepp Municipality.

=== Weather ===
Climate data for Klepp
Month	Jan	Feb	Mar	Apr	May	Jun	Jul	Aug	Sep	Oct	Nov	Dec	Year
Daily mean °C (°F)	0.6 (33.1)	0.4 (32.7)	2.6 (36.7)	5.5 (41.9)	9.8 (49.6)	12.7 (54.9)	14 (57)	14.2 (57.6)	11.7 (53.1)	8.6 (47.5)	4.5 (40.1)	2.1 (35.8)	7.2 (45.0)
Average precipitation mm (inches)	102 (4.0)	71 (2.8)	79 (3.1)	58 (2.3)	68 (2.7)	74 (2.9)	97 (3.8)	123 (4.8)	158 (6.2)	158 (6.2)	150 (5.9)	125 (4.9)	1,260 (49.6)
Source: Norwegian Meteorological Institute

== Transportation ==
The Sørlandet railway line, historically called the Jæren Line, runs through Klepp along lake Frøylandsvatnet. The village of Klepp stasjon, 3 kilometres (1.9 mi) east of Kleppe, is built around the train station Klepp Station. The nearby Oksnevadporten Station is the other railway station in Klepp.

== Economy ==
Klepp is the second largest agricultural municipality in Rogaland, with a total of around 600 farms. Kverneland Group, located in Kvernaland, is the largest manufacturer of agricultural equipment in the world.

== Sports ==
The local sports club Klepp IL most notably has a women's football team in the Norwegian top league. Famous players include Dagny Mellgren and the national team captain Ane Stangeland Horpestad. Gymnast Åge Storhaug also represented the club.

== Government ==
Klepp Municipality is responsible for primary education (through 10th grade), outpatient health services, senior citizen services, welfare and other social services, zoning, economic development, and municipal roads and utilities. The municipality is governed by a municipal council of directly elected representatives. The mayor is indirectly elected by a vote of the municipal council. The municipality is under the jurisdiction of the Sør-Rogaland District Court and the Gulating Court of Appeal.

=== Municipal council ===
The municipal council (Kommunestyre) of Klepp Municipality is made up of 31 representatives that are elected to four-year terms. The tables below show the current and historical composition of the council by political party.

Klepp kommunestyre 2023–2027
Party name (in Nynorsk)	Number of representatives
Labour Party (Arbeidarpartiet)	3
Progress Party (Framstegspartiet)	9
Conservative Party (Høgre)	7
Industry and Business Party (Industri‑ og Næringspartiet)	2
Christian Democratic Party (Kristeleg Folkeparti)	4
Centre Party (Senterpartiet)	3
Socialist Left Party (Sosialistisk Venstreparti)	1
Liberal Party (Venstre)	2
Total number of members:	31

Klepp kommunestyre 2019–2023
Party name (in Nynorsk)	Number of representatives
Labour Party (Arbeidarpartiet)	4
People's Action No to More Road Tolls (Folkeaksjonen nei til meir bompengar)	2
Progress Party (Framstegspartiet)	7
Green Party (Miljøpartiet Dei Grøne)	1
Conservative Party (Høgre)	7
Christian Democratic Party (Kristeleg Folkeparti)	4
Centre Party (Senterpartiet)	5
Socialist Left Party (Sosialistisk Venstreparti)	1
Total number of members:	31

Klepp kommunestyre 2015–2019
Party name (in Nynorsk)	Number of representatives
Labour Party (Arbeidarpartiet)	5
Progress Party (Framstegspartiet)	6
Green Party (Miljøpartiet Dei Grøne)	1
Conservative Party (Høgre)	9
Christian Democratic Party (Kristeleg Folkeparti)	5
Centre Party (Senterpartiet)	4
Liberal Party (Venstre)	1
Total number of members:	31

Klepp kommunestyre 2011–2015
Party name (in Nynorsk)	Number of representatives
Labour Party (Arbeidarpartiet)	5
Progress Party (Framstegspartiet)	6
Conservative Party (Høgre)	11
Christian Democratic Party (Kristeleg Folkeparti)	5
Centre Party (Senterpartiet)	3
Liberal Party (Venstre)	1
Total number of members:	31

Klepp kommunestyre 2007–2011
Party name (in Nynorsk)	Number of representatives
Labour Party (Arbeidarpartiet)	4
Progress Party (Framstegspartiet)	7
Conservative Party (Høgre)	8
Christian Democratic Party (Kristeleg Folkeparti)	5
Centre Party (Senterpartiet)	4
Socialist Left Party (Sosialistisk Venstreparti)	1
Liberal Party (Venstre)	2
Total number of members:	31

Klepp kommunestyre 2003–2007
Party name (in Nynorsk)	Number of representatives
Labour Party (Arbeidarpartiet)	4
Progress Party (Framstegspartiet)	8
Conservative Party (Høgre)	7
Christian Democratic Party (Kristeleg Folkeparti)	4
Centre Party (Senterpartiet)	5
Socialist Left Party (Sosialistisk Venstreparti)	2
Liberal Party (Venstre)	1
Total number of members:	31

Klepp kommunestyre 1999–2003
Party name (in Nynorsk)	Number of representatives
Labour Party (Arbeidarpartiet)	4
Progress Party (Framstegspartiet)	7
Conservative Party (Høgre)	8
Christian Democratic Party (Kristeleg Folkeparti)	7
Centre Party (Senterpartiet)	6
Socialist Left Party (Sosialistisk Venstreparti)	1
Liberal Party (Venstre)	2
Total number of members:	35

Klepp kommunestyre 1995–1999
Party name (in Nynorsk)	Number of representatives
Labour Party (Arbeidarpartiet)	5
Progress Party (Framstegspartiet)	5
Conservative Party (Høgre)	6
Christian Democratic Party (Kristeleg Folkeparti)	5
Centre Party (Senterpartiet)	11
Socialist Left Party (Sosialistisk Venstreparti)	1
Liberal Party (Venstre)	2
Total number of members:	35

Klepp kommunestyre 1991–1995
Party name (in Nynorsk)	Number of representatives
Labour Party (Arbeidarpartiet)	4
Progress Party (Framstegspartiet)	3
Conservative Party (Høgre)	8
Christian Democratic Party (Kristeleg Folkeparti)	6
Centre Party (Senterpartiet)	11
Socialist Left Party (Sosialistisk Venstreparti)	2
Liberal Party (Venstre)	1
Total number of members:	35

Klepp kommunestyre 1987–1991
Party name (in Nynorsk)	Number of representatives
Labour Party (Arbeidarpartiet)	7
Progress Party (Framstegspartiet)	4
Conservative Party (Høgre)	10
Christian Democratic Party (Kristeleg Folkeparti)	6
Centre Party (Senterpartiet)	6
Joint list of the Liberal Party (Venstre) and Liberal People's Party (Liberale Folkepartiet)	2
Total number of members:	35

Klepp kommunestyre 1983–1987
Party name (in Nynorsk)	Number of representatives
Labour Party (Arbeidarpartiet)	6
Progress Party (Framstegspartiet)	4
Conservative Party (Høgre)	10
Christian Democratic Party (Kristeleg Folkeparti)	6
Centre Party (Senterpartiet)	7
Liberal Party (Venstre)	2
Total number of members:	35

Klepp kommunestyre 1979–1983
Party name (in Nynorsk)	Number of representatives
Labour Party (Arbeidarpartiet)	6
Conservative Party (Høgre)	13
Christian Democratic Party (Kristeleg Folkeparti)	7
New People's Party (Nye Folkepartiet)	1
Centre Party (Senterpartiet)	7
Liberal Party (Venstre)	1
Total number of members:	35

Klepp kommunestyre 1975–1979
Party name (in Nynorsk)	Number of representatives
Labour Party (Arbeidarpartiet)	6
Conservative Party (Høgre)	6
Christian Democratic Party (Kristeleg Folkeparti)	8
New People's Party (Nye Folkepartiet)	2
Centre Party (Senterpartiet)	10
Liberal Party (Venstre)	1
Non-partisan local list (Upolitisk bygdeliste)	2
Total number of members:	35

Klepp kommunestyre 1971–1975
Party name (in Nynorsk)	Number of representatives
Labour Party (Arbeidarpartiet)	7
Conservative Party (Høgre)	3
Christian Democratic Party (Kristeleg Folkeparti)	7
Centre Party (Senterpartiet)	12
Liberal Party (Venstre)	3
Local List(s) (Lokale lister)	3
Total number of members:	35

Klepp kommunestyre 1967–1971
Party name (in Nynorsk)	Number of representatives
Labour Party (Arbeidarpartiet)	5
Conservative Party (Høgre)	2
Christian Democratic Party (Kristeleg Folkeparti)	4
Centre Party (Senterpartiet)	8
Liberal Party (Venstre)	3
Local List(s) (Lokale lister)	1
Total number of members:	23

Klepp kommunestyre 1963–1967
Party name (in Nynorsk)	Number of representatives
Labour Party (Arbeidarpartiet)	5
Conservative Party (Høgre)	2
Christian Democratic Party (Kristeleg Folkeparti)	4
Centre Party (Senterpartiet)	9
Liberal Party (Venstre)	3
Total number of members:	23

Klepp heradsstyre 1959–1963
Party name (in Nynorsk)	Number of representatives
Labour Party (Arbeidarpartiet)	3
Conservative Party (Høgre)	1
Christian Democratic Party (Kristeleg Folkeparti)	4
Centre Party (Senterpartiet)	10
Liberal Party (Venstre)	4
Local List(s) (Lokale lister)	1
Total number of members:	23

Klepp heradsstyre 1955–1959
Party name (in Nynorsk)	Number of representatives
Labour Party (Arbeidarpartiet)	3
Christian Democratic Party (Kristeleg Folkeparti)	4
Farmers' Party (Bondepartiet)	11
Liberal Party (Venstre)	5
Total number of members:	23

Klepp heradsstyre 1951–1955
Party name (in Nynorsk)	Number of representatives
Labour Party (Arbeidarpartiet)	2
Conservative Party (Høgre)	1
Christian Democratic Party (Kristeleg Folkeparti)	3
Farmers' Party (Bondepartiet)	7
Liberal Party (Venstre)	2
Local List(s) (Lokale lister)	1
Total number of members:	16

Klepp heradsstyre 1947–1951
Party name (in Nynorsk)	Number of representatives
Labour Party (Arbeidarpartiet)	2
Farmers' Party (Bondepartiet)	2
Liberal Party (Venstre)	1
List of workers, fishermen, and small farmholders (Arbeidarar, fiskarar, småbrukarar liste)	1
Joint List(s) of Non-Socialist Parties (Borgarlege Felleslister)	6
Local List(s) (Lokale lister)	4
Total number of members:	16

Klepp heradsstyre 1945–1947
Party name (in Nynorsk)	Number of representatives
Labour Party (Arbeidarpartiet)	3
Liberal Party (Venstre)	1
Local List(s) (Lokale lister)	12
Total number of members:	16

Klepp heradsstyre 1937–1941*
Party name (in Nynorsk)	Number of representatives
Labour Party (Arbeidarpartiet)	3
Farmers' Party (Bondepartiet)	3
Joint List(s) of Non-Socialist Parties (Borgarlege Felleslister)	6
Local List(s) (Lokale lister)	4
Total number of members:	16
Note: Due to the German occupation of Norway during World War II, no elections were held for new municipal councils until after the war ended in 1945.

=== Mayors ===
The mayor (Nynorsk: ordførar) of Klepp Municipality is the political leader of the municipality and the chairperson of the municipal council. The following people have held this position:

- 1838–1845: Ingebret Gullicksen Grude
- 1846–1849: Erik Eriksson Stangeland
- 1849–1851: Ingebret Gullicksen Grude
- 1851–1851: Henrik Tostensen Ødegaard
- 1852–1855: Johan Garmann Grude
- 1856–1858: Paul Hansen Hauge
- 1859–1859: Henrik Tostensen Ødegaard
- 1860–1863: Carl Grude
- 1864–1867: Thore Ellingsen
- 1868–1869: Johan Garmann Grude
- 1870–1871: Thore Ellingsen
- 1872–1879: Johan Garmann Grude
- 1880–1881: Rasmus Olsen Kleppe
- 1882–1885: Thore Ellingsen
- 1886–1895: Kornelius C. Kleppe
- 1896–1904: O. Anda
- 1905–1907: I. Grude
- 1908–1910: Kornelius C. Kleppe
- 1911–1913: O. Anda
- 1913–1916: Thore Larsen Braut (V)
- 1917–1919: D. Carlsen
- 1920–1922: Eivind Stangeland
- 1923–1931: O. Borsheim
- 1932–1937: P. Krohn
- 1938–1939: Ola Stangeland
- 1939–1941: F. Ravndal
- 1941–1941: O.J. Horpestad (NS)
- 1942–1945: Martin S. Wiig (NS)
- 1945–1945: F. Ravndal
- 1945–1947: A.M. Stangeland
- 1947–1951: Sven Grude
- 1951–1955: Ommund Thu
- 1955–1961: Hans K. Sveinsvoll (Bp)
- 1961–1971: Ola M. Wiig (Sp)
- 1971–1981: Enok E. Stangeland (Sp)
- 1981–1987: Lars Brunes (H)
- 1987–1991: Asbjørn Kverneland (H)
- 1991–1999: Ole I. Bore (Sp)
- 1999–2011: Elfin Lea (H)
- 2011–2019: Ane Mari Braut Nese (H)
- 2019–2023: Sigmund Rolfsen (Ap)
- 2023–present: Kjetil Maudal (FrP)

=== Parliament ===
There have been many members of the Parliament of Norway from Klepp. Thore Larsen Braut and Karl K. Kleppe were members of Parliament prior to the Second World War. After the war Lars Storhaug, Oddbjørg Ausdal Starrfelt, and Knut Haus have been members of Parliament.

== Notable people ==
- Theodor Dahl (1886–1946), a journalist, short story writer, novelist, and poet
- Asgaut Steinnes (1892–1973), a historian who was the National archivist of Norway from 1933 to 1960
- Torvald Tu (1893–1955), a poet, playwright, novelist, and writer of humoresques
- Sigve Tjøtta (born 1930), a mathematician and long-distance runner
- Åse-Marie Nesse (1934–2001), a philologist, academic, and poet
- Arne Sølvberg (born 1940), a computer scientist, academic, and expert in information modelling
