= Jæren =

- District
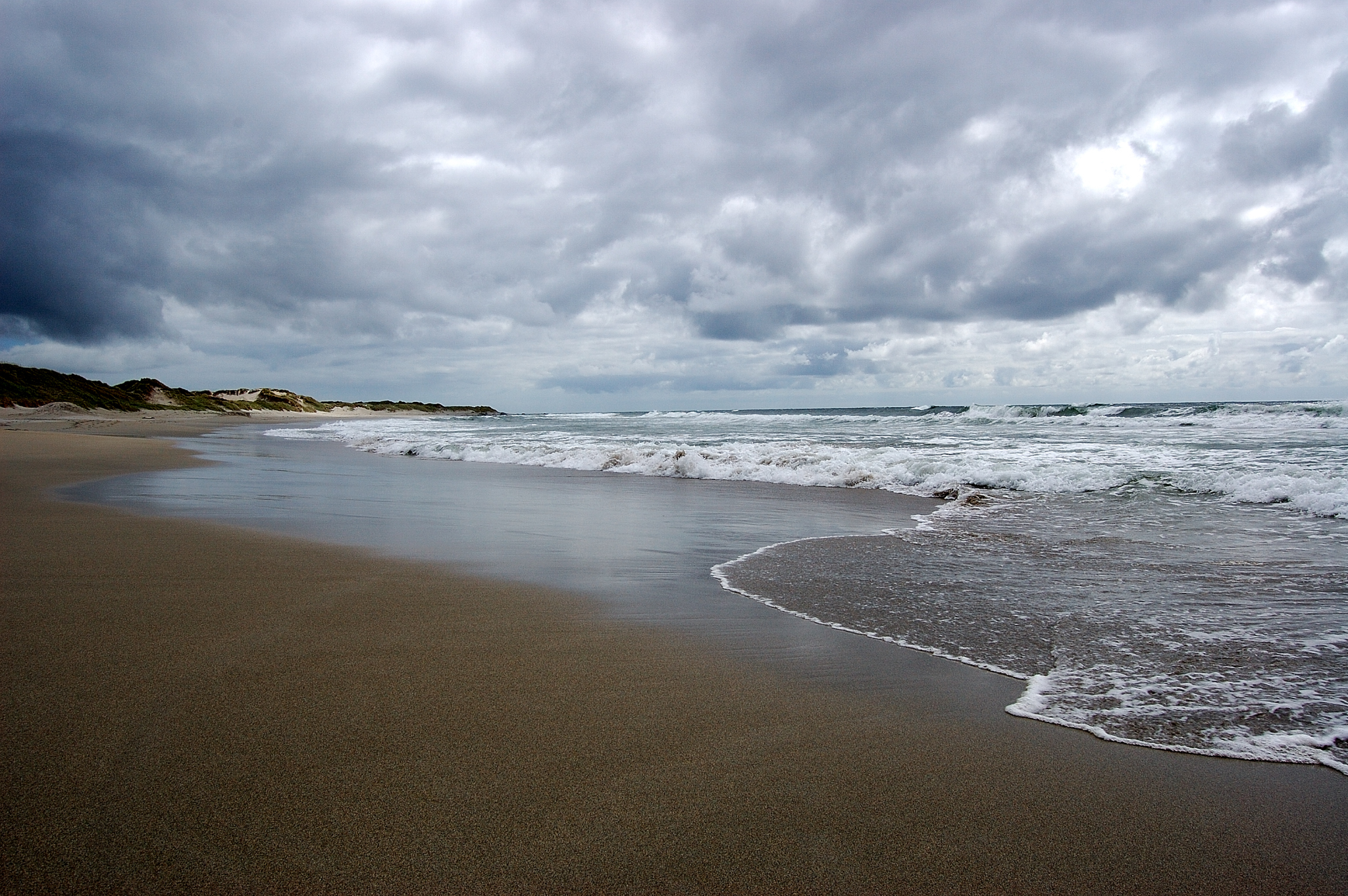
- One of the many beaches along the Jæren coastline.

- Jæren
- Coordinates: 58°43′N 05°45′E
- Country: Norway
- County: Rogaland
- Region: Vestlandet
- Urban Center: Stavanger

Area
  - Total: 2,569 km^{2} (992 sq mi)

Population (2026)
  - Total: 353,543
  - Density: 137.6/km^{2} (356.4/sq mi)
- Demonym: Jærbu

Jæren is a traditional district in Rogaland county, Norway. The other districts in Rogaland are Dalane, Ryfylke, and Haugalandet. Jæren is one of the 15 districts that comprise Western Norway.

At about 700 square kilometres (270 sq mi), Jæren is the largest flat lowland area in Norway, stretching from Randaberg Municipality in the north to Hå Municipality in the south. It includes the whole Stavanger Peninsula and the mainland area at its base. The coast is flat compared to the rest of the mountainous Norwegian coast, and it has sandy beaches along most of the coastline. The largest urban area in Jæren is the adjoining cities of Stavanger/Sandnes (pop. 210,874 in 2015).

== Economy ==
The petroleum industry around Stavanger is an important part of the economy of Jæren, with the headquarters of the country's largest oil company Equinor being located in Jæren, as well regional offices of international companies like ExxonMobil, Eni, Shell, ConocoPhillips, BP, Schlumberger, Halliburton, Baker Hughes, and several others. Jæren is also one of the most important agricultural areas of Norway, with a long crop period and varied and well-developed livestock production. Industry here is also strongly connected to the farming industry, with one of the largest producers of agricultural machines in the world, Kverneland Group, located in Time Municipality and Klepp Municipality.

== Name ==
The Old Norse form of the name was Jaðarr [ˈjɑðɑrː]. The name is identical with the word jaðarr which means "edge" or "brim". Several farms in Norway (around 30) have the same name. The name refers to the 60 km long coastline stretching from Brusand in the south to Tungenes in the north.

== Location ==
Jæren is the largest flat lowland area in Norway. It comprises the coastline from the Stavanger Peninsula near the mouth of the great Boknafjorden all the way, south nearly to Egersund. Unlike most of the Norwegian coastline, there are very few offshore islands and few fjords cutting into the shoreline. Jærens rev (Jæren's reef) is a partly stony sandbar which extends almost 2 nautical miles (3.7 km) to the west in front of the Revtangen headland in Klepp municipality, the westernmost point of Jæren.

=== Municipalities ===
The geographical region of Jæren has eight municipalities. The population and area statistics from 2026 are listed below: In 2020, some municipalities were enlarged, so that now the islands of northeastern Stavanger Municipality and the eastern parts of Sandnes Municipality and Gjesdal Municipality are part of the Jæren municipalities, but those areas were not historically part of Jæren.

Coat of arms	Name	Population	Area	Pop. density
	Randaberg Municipality	11,841	25	479
	Stavanger Municipality	151,669	262	578
	Sola Municipality	29,541	69	428
	Sandnes Municipality	85,785	1041	82
	Klepp Municipality	21,444	113	189
	Hå Municipality	20,087	258	78
	Time Municipality	20,461	183	112
	Gjesdal Municipality	12,715	618	21

=== Alternate descriptions ===
The geographical region of Jæren constitutes the above-mentioned municipalities, but the description of Jæren varies. Legally speaking, the Jæren District Court constitutes only Sandnes Municipality, Gjesdal Municipality, Klepp Municipality, Time Municipality, and Hå Municipality. Some areas not traditionally in the area included in the district, and other areas are part of the Stavanger District Court.

Religiously speaking, the Jæren deanery of the Church of Norway constitutes the churches in Hå Municipality, Klepp Municipality, Time Municipality, and Gjesdal Municipality. Geographically speaking, Gjesdal Municipality lies in the transition between Jæren and Dalane districts, but it is traditionally considered to be part of Jæren.

Confusion over the extent of the district is added by the fact that in everyday language, the name Jæren for most people does not include the towns of Stavanger and Sandnes but only the more rural area to the south.

== Notable people ==
- Erik Thorvaldsson (ca.950–ca.1000), better known as Erik the Red
- Arne Garborg (1851–1924), an author and poet
- Alf-Inge Haaland (born 1972), a footballer
- Filip Ingebrigtsen (born 1993), a distance runner
- Jakob Ingebrigtsen (born 2000), a distance runner
- Erling Haaland (born 2000), a footballer

== Gallery ==
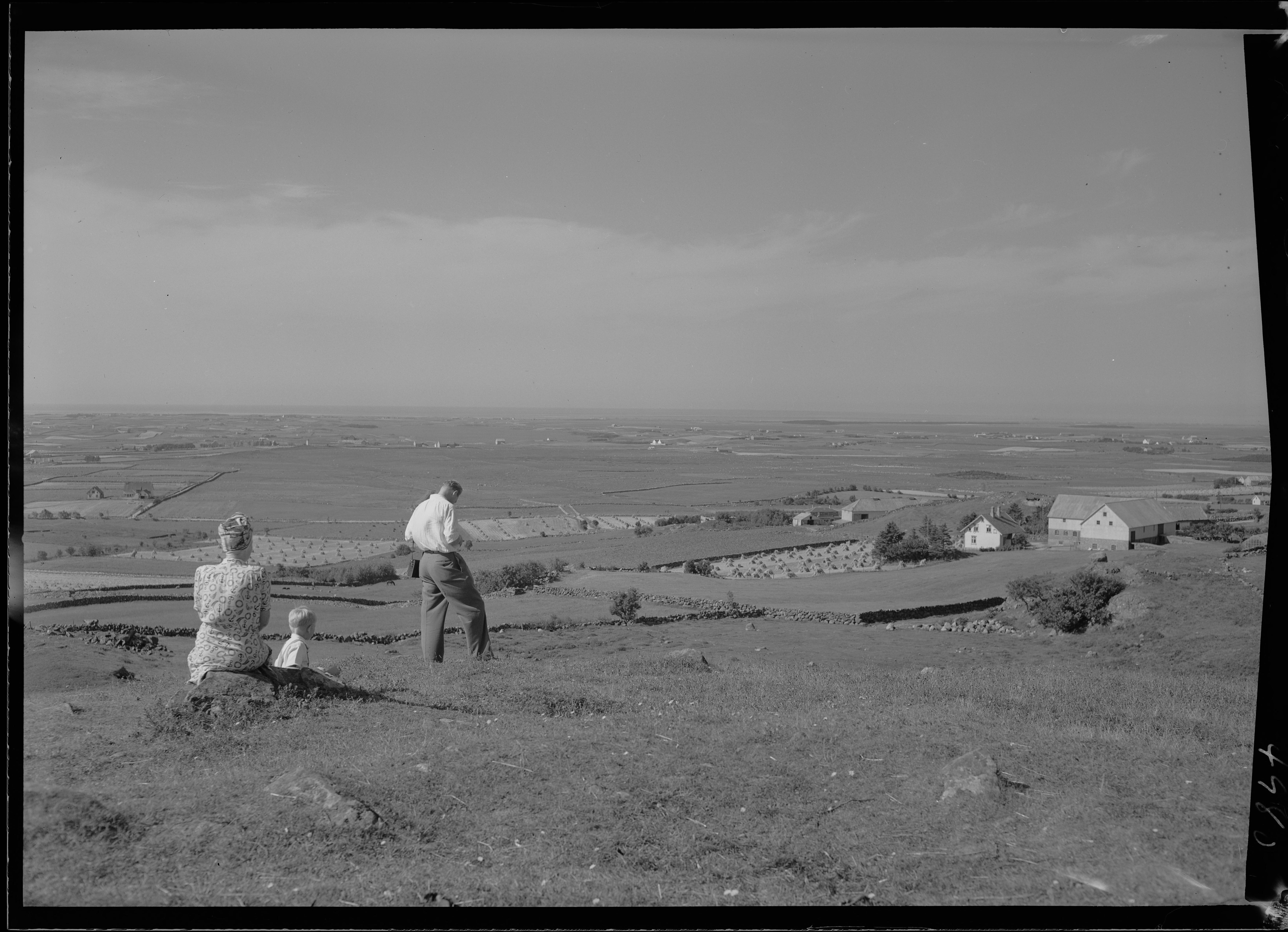
Tinghaug in Jæren circa 1947

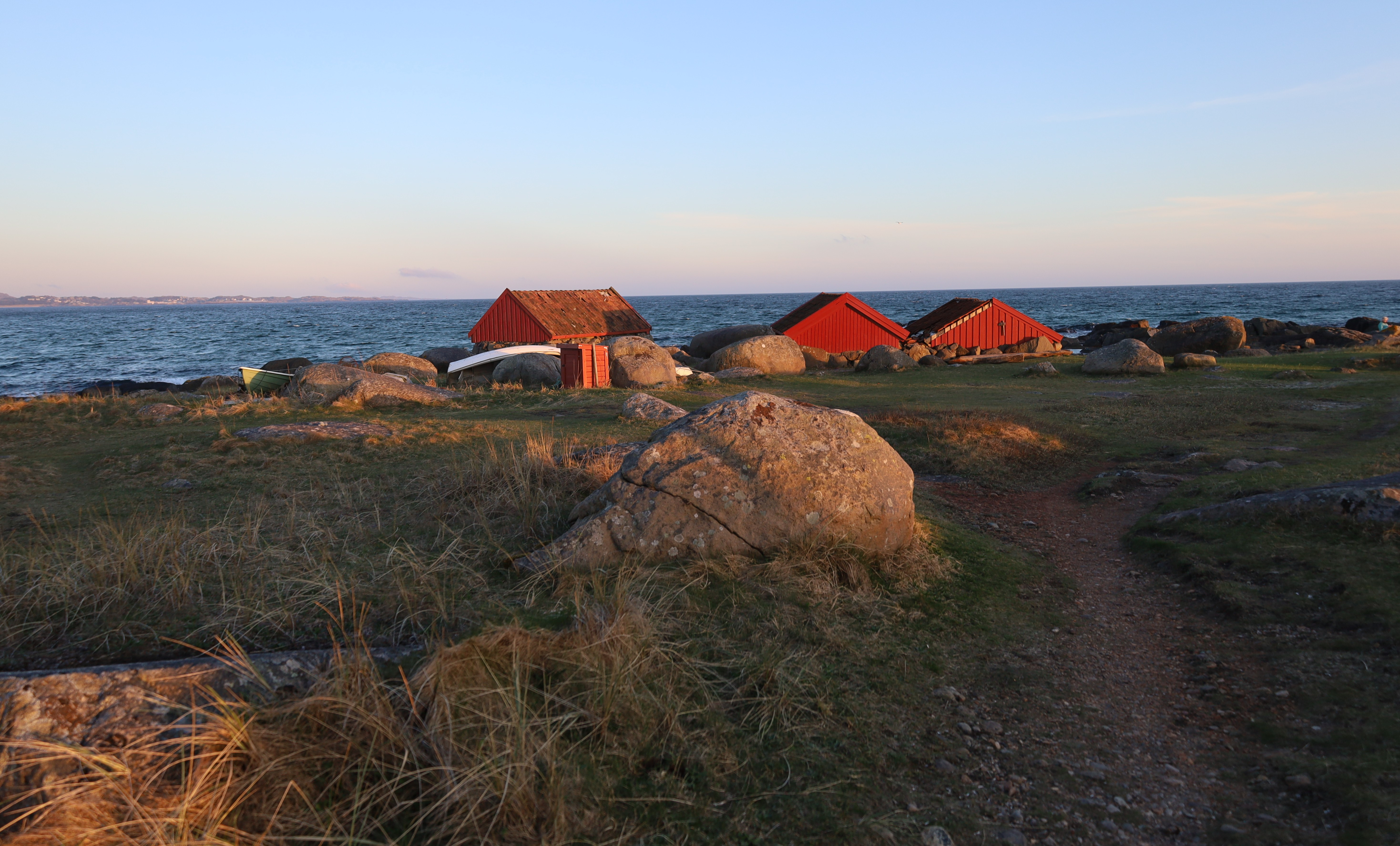
Boat-houses, 2025

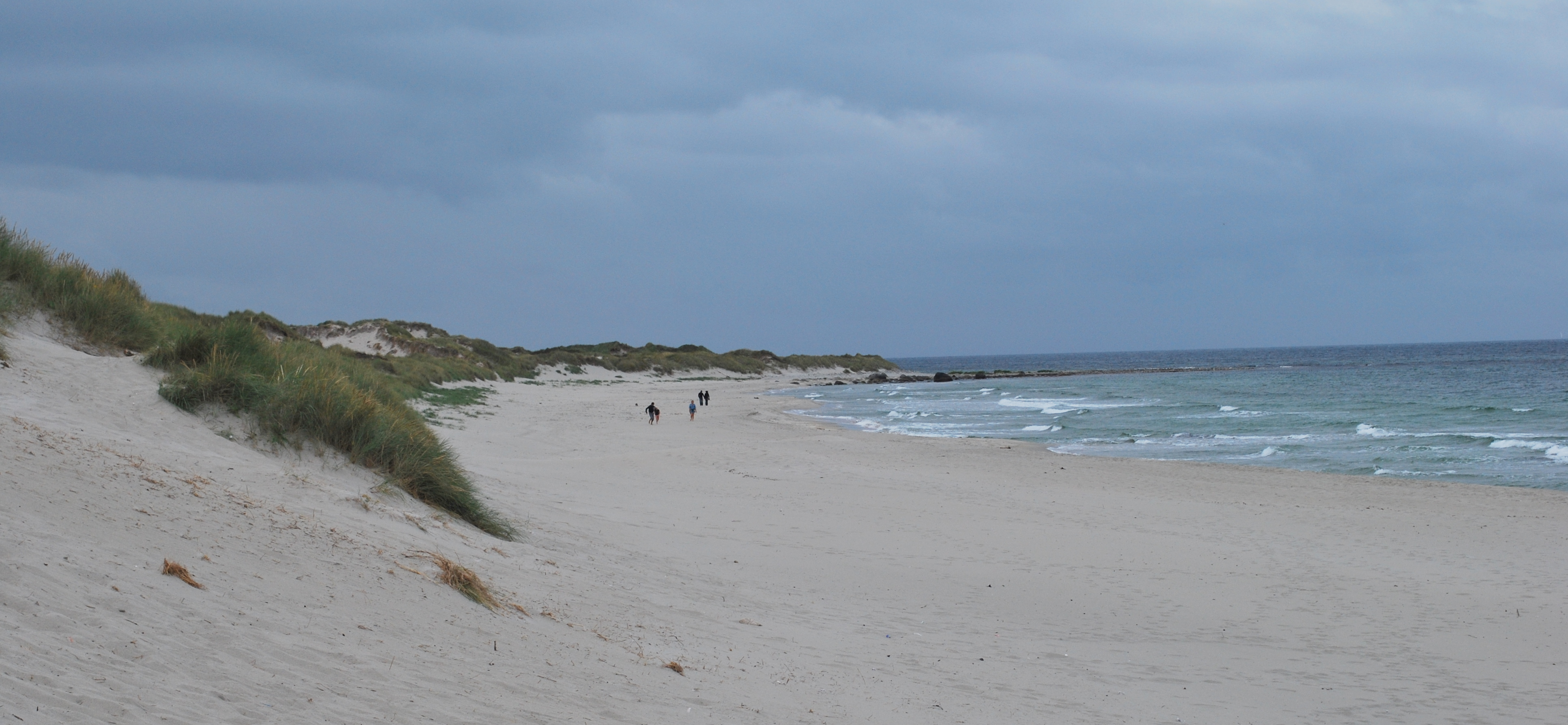
Orrestranda beach, Klepp, Jæren, 2008

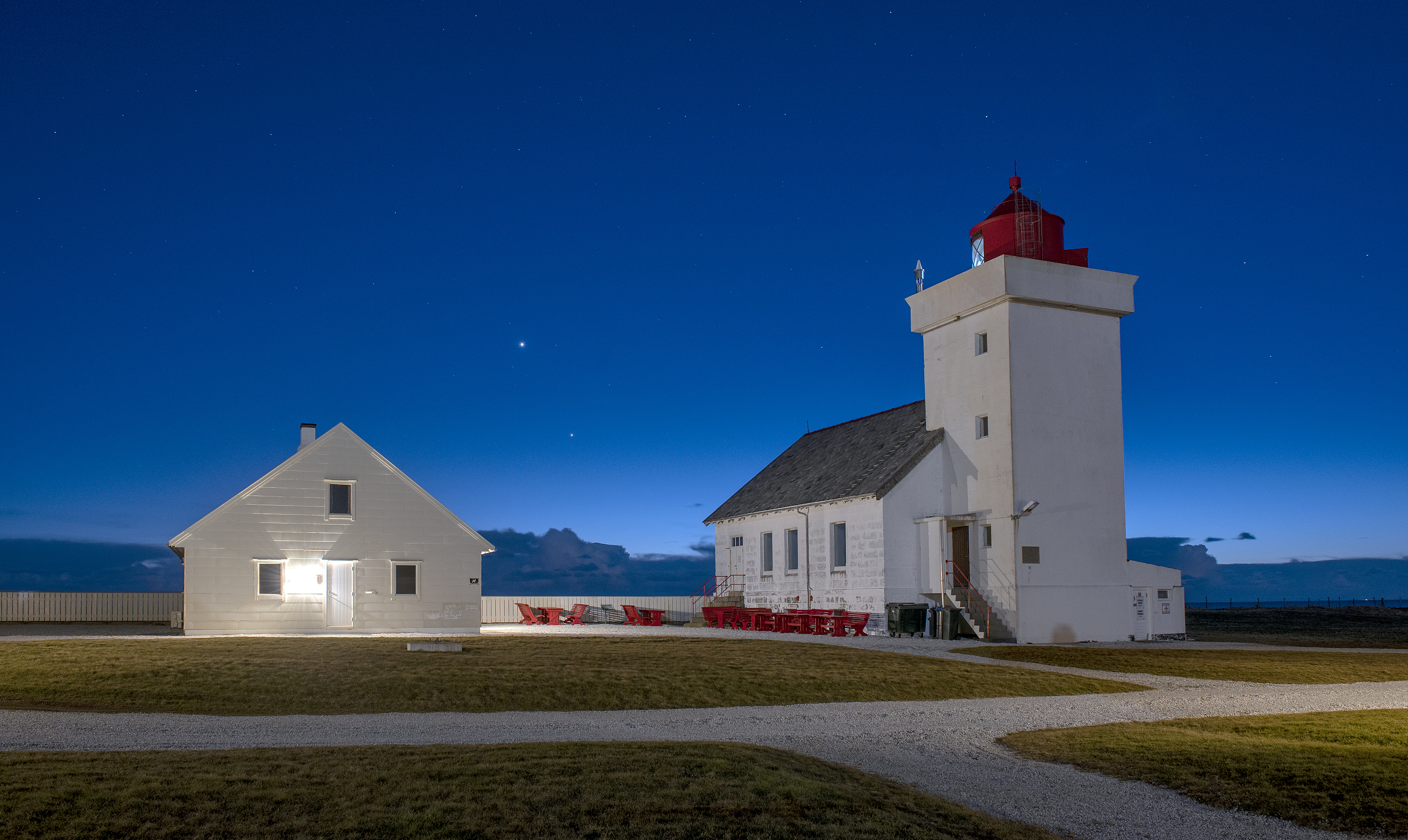
Obrestad lighthouse, built in 1873 and located on the coast of Jæren in Rogaland

== See also ==
- Norwegian County Road 44, national tourist road for the region.
