= Undheim (disambiguation) =

Undheim is a village in Norway. Undheim may also refer to:

== People ==
- Bjarne Undheim (1905–1988), Norwegian politician
- Liv Undheim (1949–2011), Norwegian trade unionist
- Sissel Undheim, Norwegian scholar

== Other uses ==
- Undheim Church, church in Norway
