= Ivar Mortensson-Egnund =

Norwegian writer and revolutionary (1857–1934)

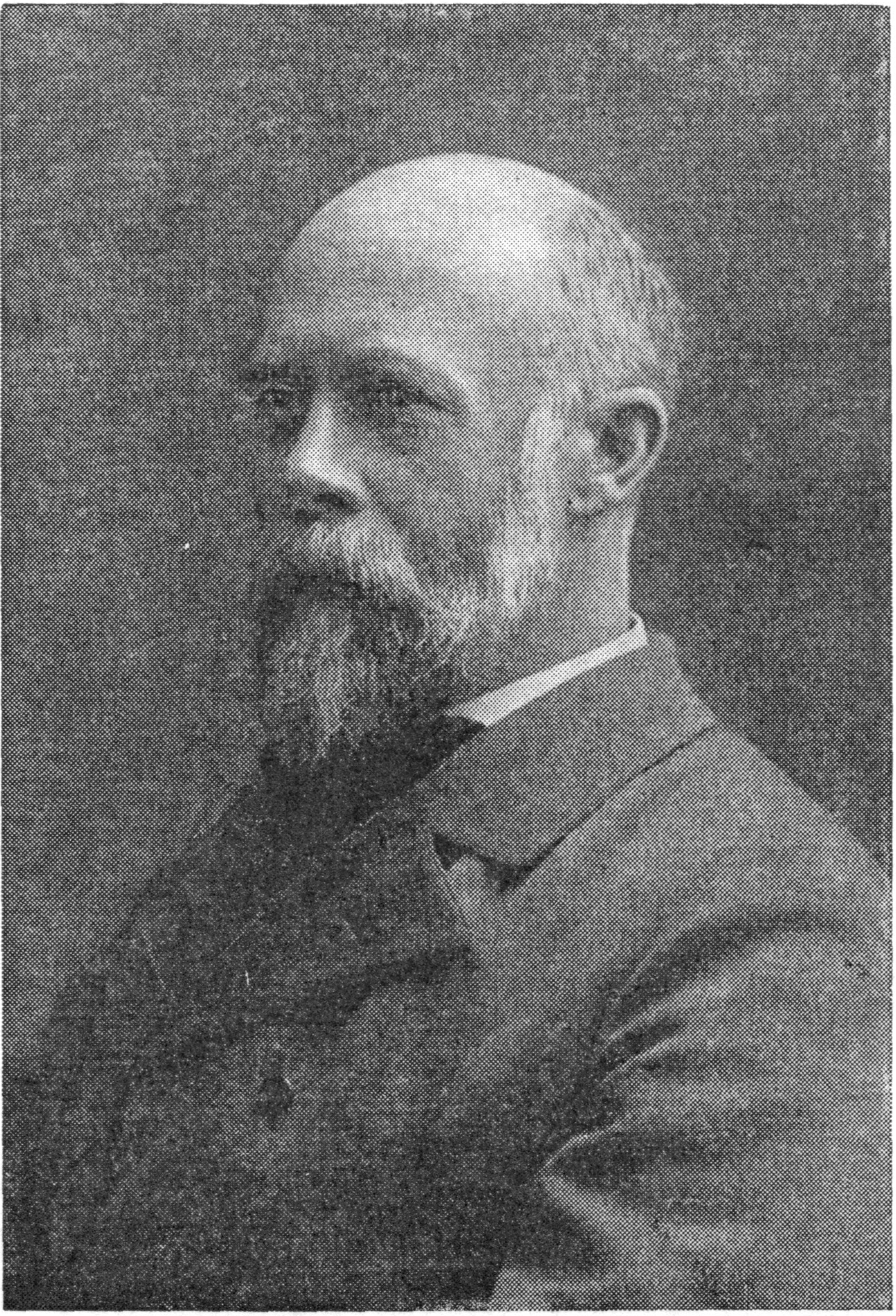
Ivar Mortensson-Egnund.

Ivar Mortensson-Egnund (originally Ivar Julius Mortensen and also referred to as Ivar Matlaus; 24 July 1857 – 16 February 1934) was a Norwegian author, journalist, theologian, researcher, translator, writer, philosopher and advocate of nynorsk (the new Norwegian language). He was born in Tynset Municipality (now part in Alvdal Municipality) in North Østerdalen. His parents were Anne Petronelle Tangen, and Morten Mortensen Ogarden, a former parliament member for the Liberal Party, both from Tynset Municipality. He studied theology in Christiania and got his cand. theol. in 1883. However, he did not practice as a priest before he became a diocese curate at Hamar in 1909. In 1894 he married Karen Nilsen and they farmed at Einabu in Folldal Municipality, a farm which his family had purchased in 1873.

== Childhood ==
Ivar Mortensson grew up in a religiously Haugianistic and politically liberal home. He completed the examen artium at Aars og Voss` school in Christiania in 1875 and the cand. theol. in 1883.

== Poet and supporter for Nynorsk ==
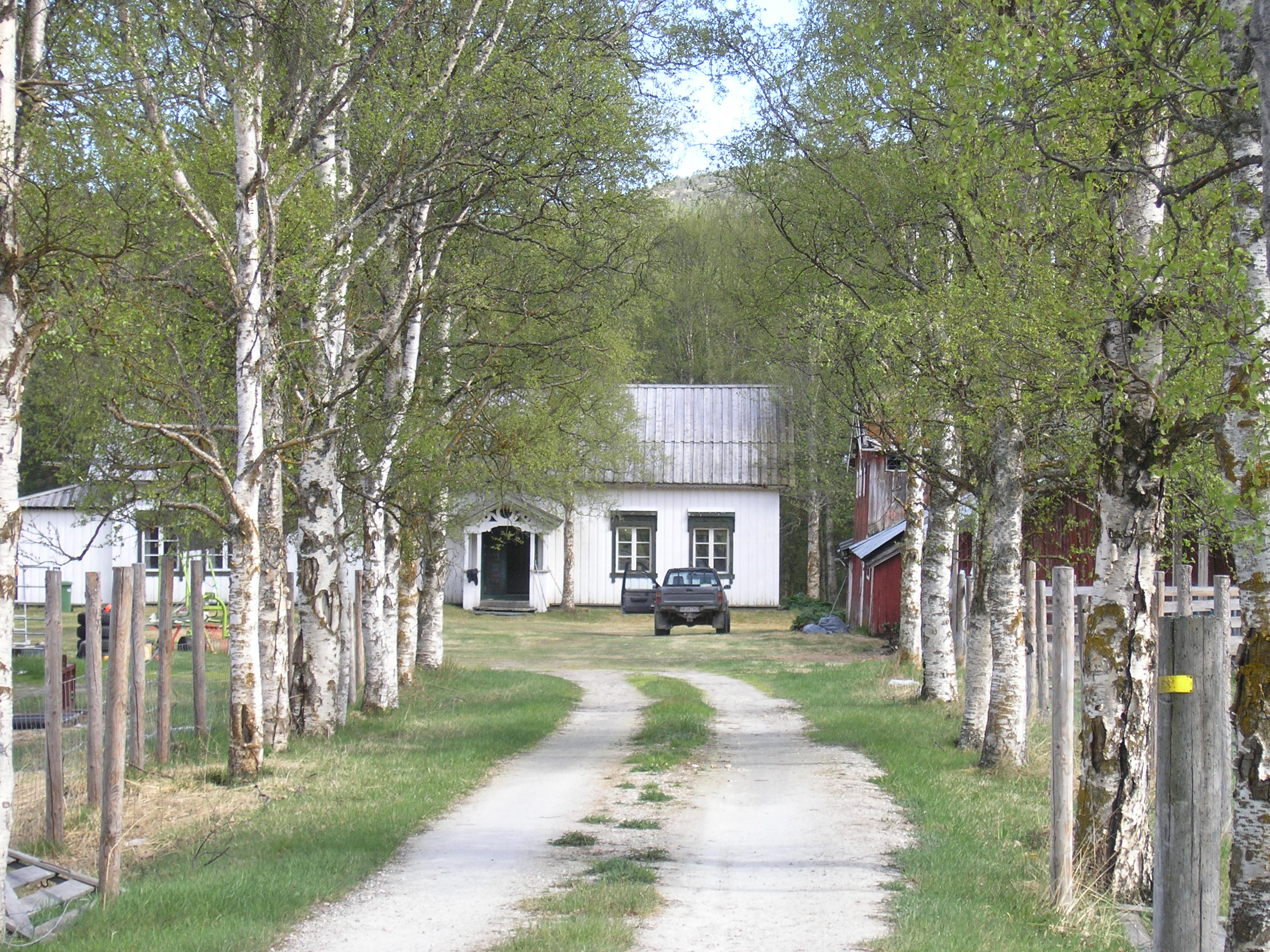
Ivar Mortensson-Egnund's home Einabu.

Mortensson-Egnund dedicated his life to the reconstruction of the Norwegian written language, working to free it from the Danish chancery language. Around the turn of the century he became a strong opponent of the riksmål supporter Bjørnstjerne Bjørnson.

In the 1870s, he was a friend and acquaintance of Moltke Moe, and through him met Arne Garborg. In 1877 when Garborg started the magazine "Fedraheimen" Mortensson became an employee. It was also Ivar who helped Hulda and Arne Garborg locate & rent a small cabin on the small farm "Kolbotnen", near the lake Savalen in Alvdal Municipality in 1887. When Garborg moved there, Mortensson followed. At this time these friends had little money and Garborg styled Mortenssonn as “Ivar Matlaus” (Ivar Foodless).

Mortensson-Egnund was also a poet, and in 1889 he published "Paa ymse gjerdom", followed by "Or duldo" in 1895. Later, he was best known for his setting the Draumkvedet (1905) and the Poetic Edda (1908) into modern Norwegian.

Ivar Mortensson-Egnund is often mentioned as a sponsor of and influence on Olav Aukrust. After Aukrust had finished his three years of teacher's education in Elverum in 1906 and moved to Folldal Municipality as a teacher, where he lived at Einabu the two years he was there. Helge Groth wrote "Of all the Norwegian poets and authors, none more directly influenced Olav Aukrust than Ivar Mortensson-Egnund."

Mortensson-Egnund had built a poet's retreat on the top of the ridge in the direction of Egnund chapel, sitting on the ridge of an esker—a trace from the last ice age. Mortensson-Egnund worked there in the daytime during the summer, but used his farm Einabu for meals and lodging.

He lived at the Einabu farm with the poet's retreat up along Norwegian Highway 29, near the Einunna river bridge, for much of his life. The main building from the 1870s stands still as it did in his time. Along the road there is a bust of Ivar Mortensson-Egnund carved by Trygve Dammen bust; it was unveiled on the 100-anniversary of his birth in 1957. The North Østerdal museum includes a display covering his history.

== Revolutionary ==
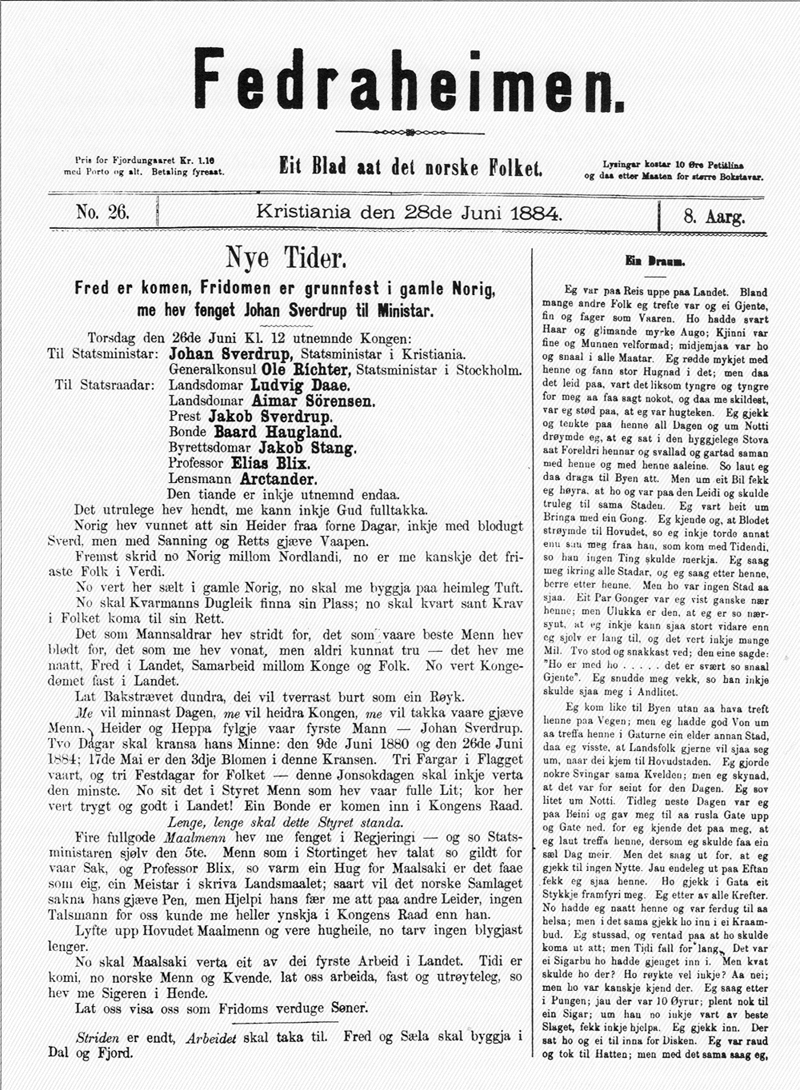
The front page of Fedraheimen, June 28. 1884.

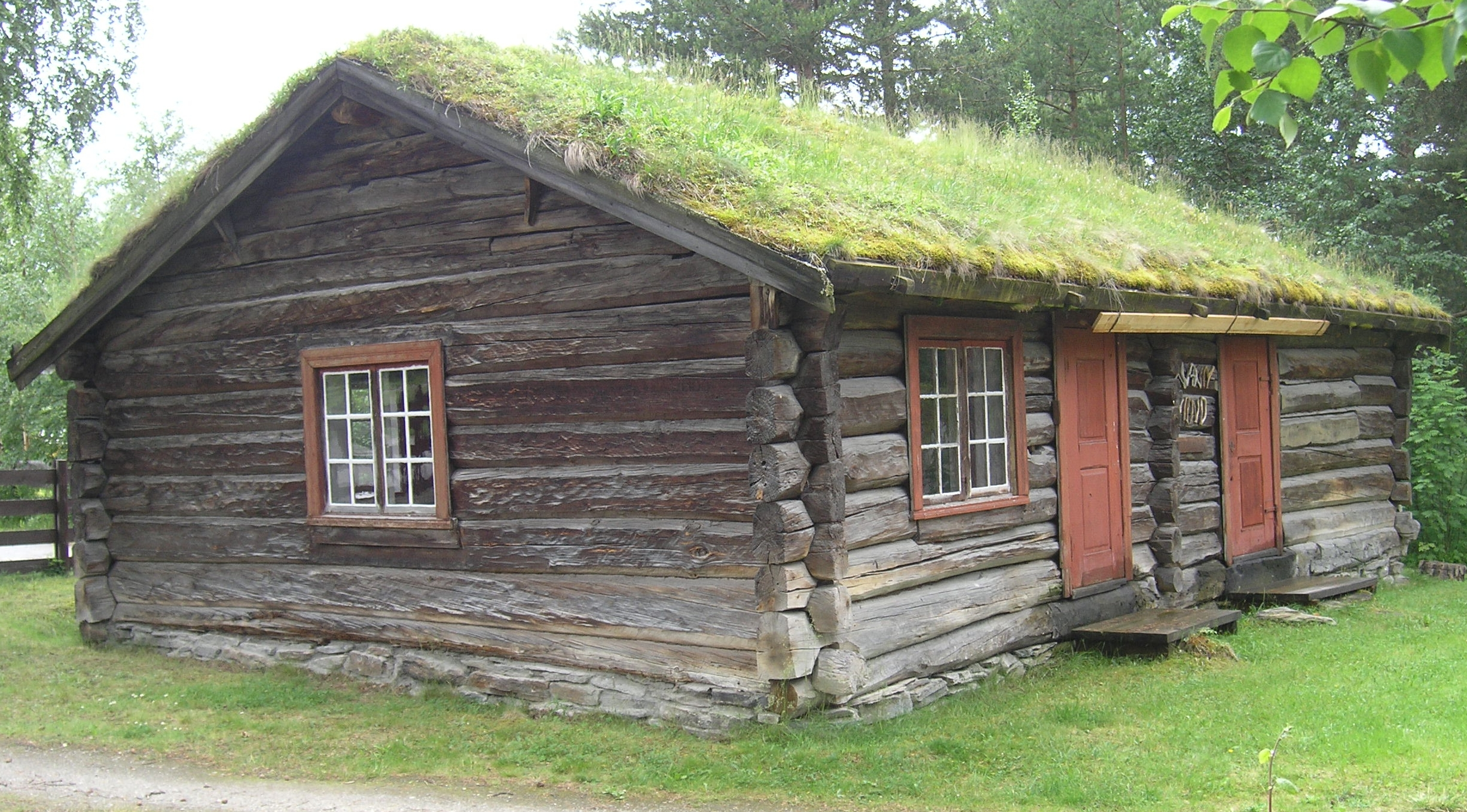
From 1888 on Fedraheimen was edited from this log cabin, now in Tynset Bygdemuseum.

Mortensson-Egnund was a powerful and intense revolutionary. He was arrested in 1881 when he led a rebellion in Skien in support of Johan Sverdrup, parliamentary reform and Nynorsk. He attempted to unify nationalism, anarchism, mysticism and religion in his poetry and his work.

In 1883 Mortensson-Egnund became editor of the paper Fedraheimen, and served until 1889. Under Mortensson leadership the newspaper embraced the war against "the moneyed, ministers of state and imperialism". Mortensson called the magazine a "communist-anarchist organ for the country" and published extensive material from the international anarchist movement.

In 1888 Mortensson supported Garborg as Storting representative for Hedmark; the campaign was unsuccessful. The following year he held a 17 May independence celebration in Tynset Municipality, where he argued against cowardliness of the members of the Norwegian Constitutional Assembly, but praised the French Revolution. He concluded by singing La Marseillaise for shocked farmers. He and Garborg resigned from the Liberals and formed a workers party for Tynset Municipality and Røros Municipality.

Fedraheimen ceased publication in 1891, two years after Mortensson-Egnund resigned as editor; his successor was Rasmus Steinsvik.

Mortensson-Egnund published the anarchist magazine Fridom (freedom) from 1896 to 1899, and corresponded with the well-known Russian anarchist Pjotr Kropotkin, whose concept of voluntary cooperation influenced him greatly. At this time Mortensson-Egnund developed a theory that the Norwegian farmers in prehistoric times had lived in anarchic groups that he called samnøyter.

== Priest ==
In 1909 Mortensson-Egnund was diocese curate in Hamar, and he was ordained as a priest in Norway the following year. Beginning in 1919 he was involved in translating the Bible into landsmål. He received a Government stipend from 1929 forward.

Mortensson-Egnund's friend Garborg had an interest in Theosophy, and another of his closest friends, Marta Steinsvik, joined Rudolf Steiner’s Anthroposophy movement. After Steiner in 1913, broke out of the Theosophical Society and founded the Anthroposophical Society, Mortensson-Egnund and his wife Karen were among Steiner's followers in Norwegian Vidar group. In 1915, when Vidar was the first magazine for Anthroposophy published in Norway, it opened with an article by Mortensson-Egnund that drew relationships with the mythological Víðarr.

== Bibliography ==
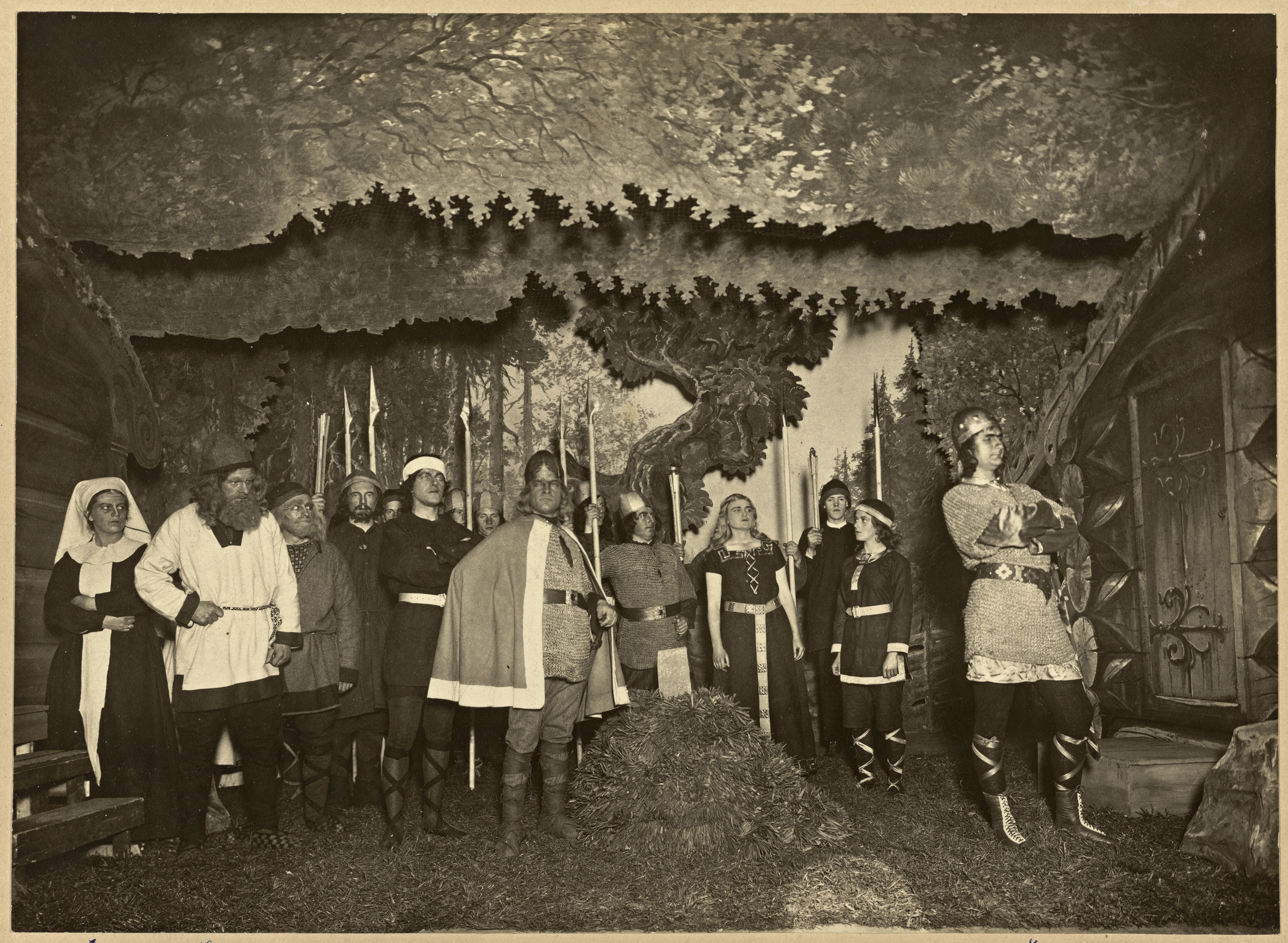
1915 performance of the play Varg i Veum (1901) in Oslo

- Lesebok i det Norske folkemaalet together with A. Garborg (1885)
- Paa ymse gjerdom (1889)
- Or duldo (1895)
- In Varg Veum (play) (1901)
- Ivar Aasen (1902)
- Hugleik, Valund (play) (1902)
- Bondeskipnad i Norig i eldre tid (1904)
- Ein frikar. Narrative (1905)
- Draumkvæet (translation to modern Norwegian) (1905)
- Trollham (1906)
- Skogtroll (1906)
- Den eldre Edda (translation to modern Norwegian) (1908)
- Runir (1908)

Moreover, he wrote numerous articles and poems. He is known particularly for the poem "Flaumen går" from 1906.
