= Garborg =

Garborg is a surname. Notable people with the surname include:

- Arne Garborg (1851–1924), Norwegian writer
- Hulda Garborg (1862–1934), Norwegian writer, novelist, playwright, poet, folk dancer, and theatre instructor, wife of Arne
