= Lyefjell =

Village in Time Municipality, Norway

- Village
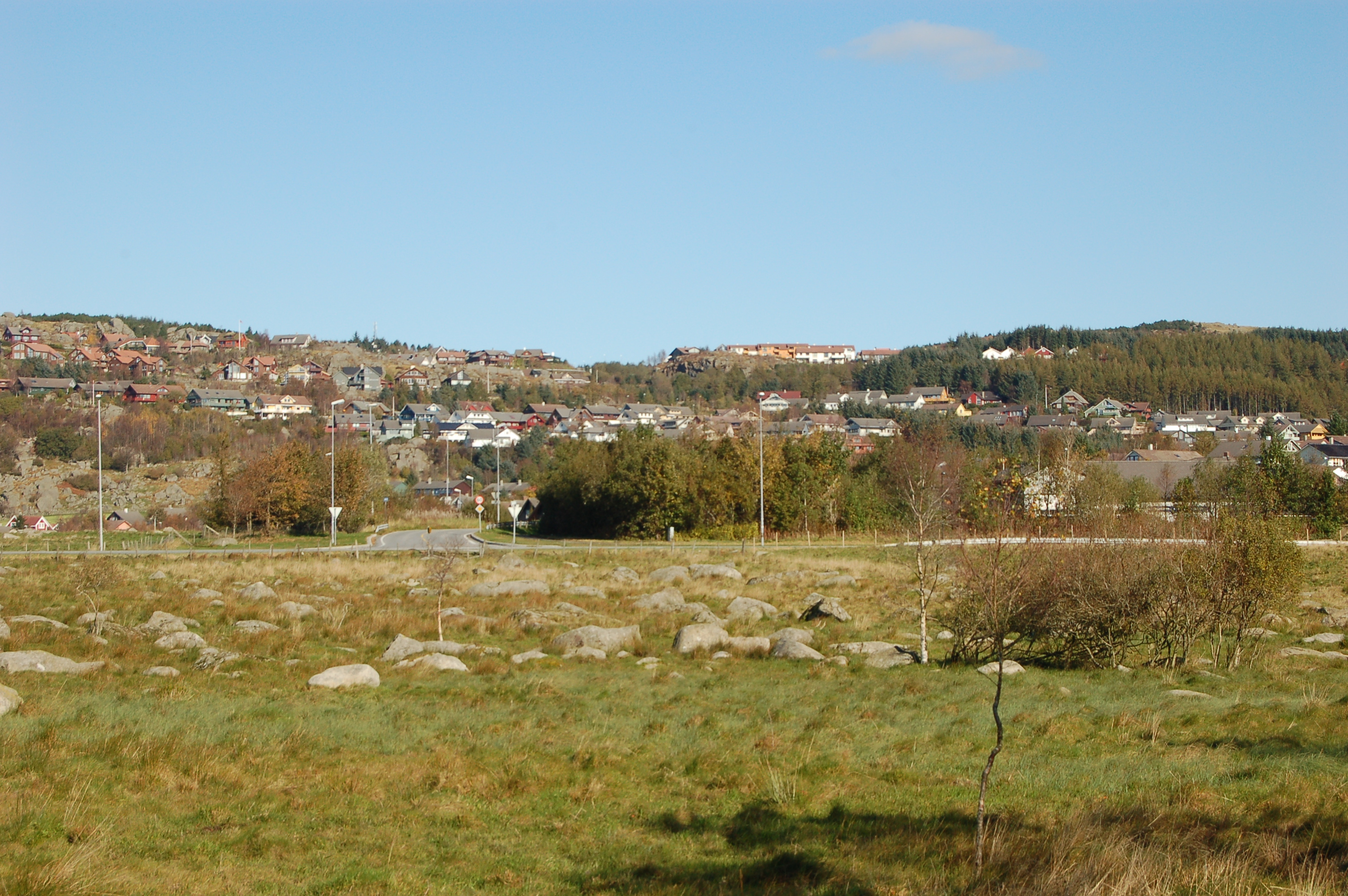
- View of the village
- Interactive map of Lyefjell
- Coordinates: 58.73486°N 5.73152°E
- Country: Norway
- Region: Western Norway
- County: Rogaland
- District: Jæren
- Municipality: Time Municipality

Area
  - Total: 0.94 km^{2} (0.36 sq mi)
- Elevation: 208 m (682 ft)

Population (2025)
  - Total: 2,380
  - Density: 2,532/km^{2} (6,560/sq mi)
- Time zone: UTC+01:00 (CET)
  - Summer (DST): UTC+02:00 (CEST)
- Post Code: 4347 Lye

Lyefjell is a village in Time Municipality in Rogaland county, Norway. The village is located in the hills about 5 kilometres (3.1 mi) east of the town of Bryne and about 5 kilometres (3.1 mi) north of the villages of Mossige and Undheim.

The village is a residential area that was built in the hills so that the flat, agricultural areas could continue to be used for farming. It is just to the south of the mountain Njåfjellet and the village has views of the flat plains of Jæren below.

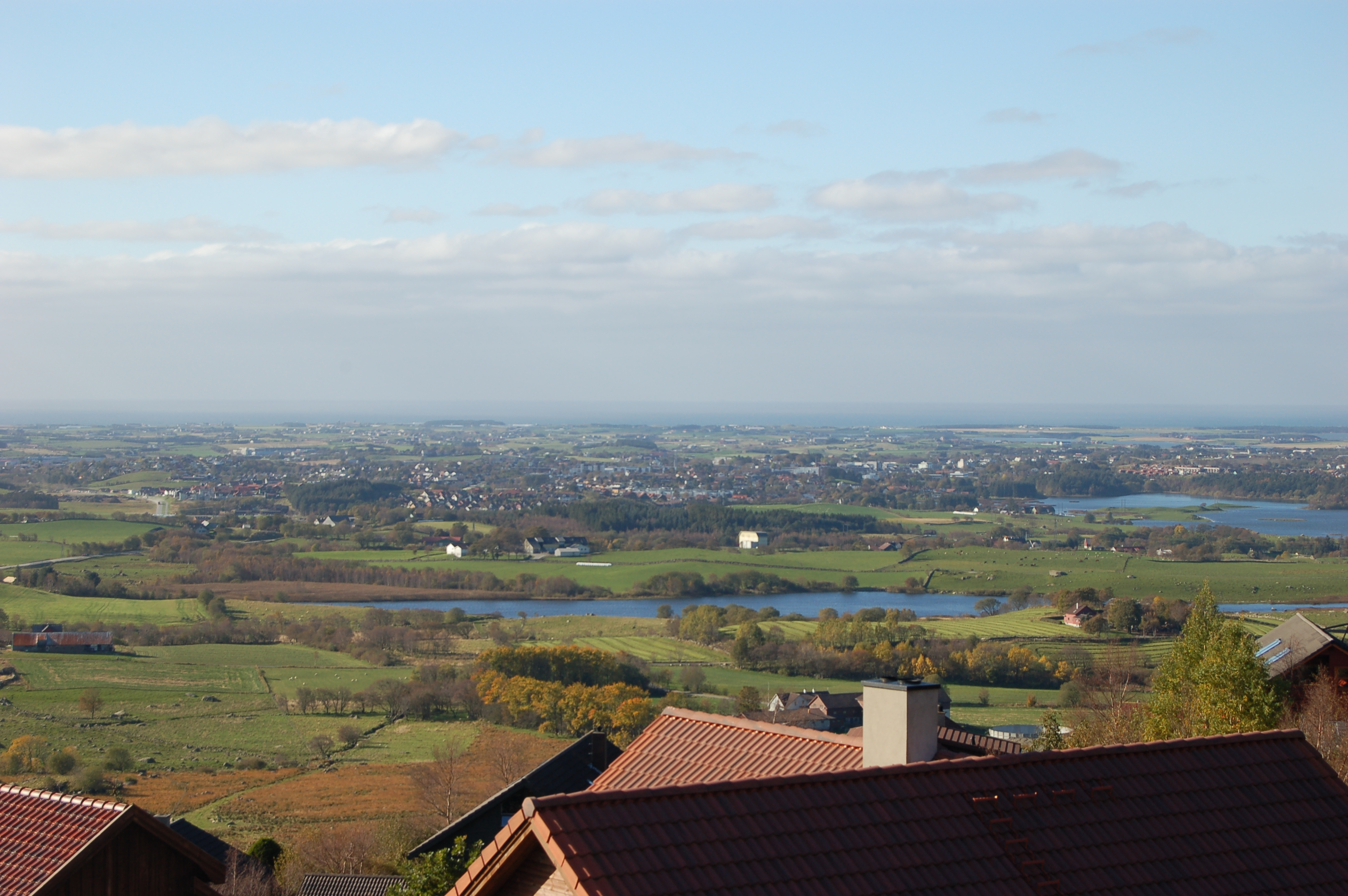
View from Lyefjell looking towards Bryne

The 0.94-square-kilometre (230-acre) village has a population (2025) of 2,380 which gives the village a population density of 2,532 inhabitants per square kilometre (6,560/sq mi).

There is an elementary and middle school in Lyefjell as well as three large pre-schools. There is also a well stocked grocery store right next to the local auto shop. The grocery store also serves as a delivery point for packages for Posten and PostNord.
