= Rasmus Løland =

Norwegian writer (1861–1907)

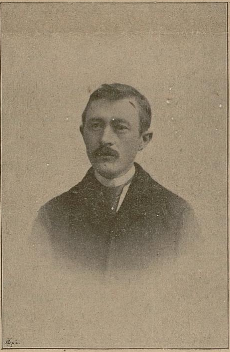
Rasmus Løland

Rasmus Løland (24 May 1861 – 12 October 1907) was a Norwegian journalist, novelist and children's writer.

== Biography ==
Rasmus Løland was born on a farm at Ryfylke in Rogaland county, Norway. In the late 1890s, he had travel grants to Germany and Austria. In 1903 he bought a house at Labråten in Asker. His first literary works were published in the magazine Fedraheimen in the 1880s, and his first book was the short story collection Folkeliv from 1891. He edited the children's magazine Norsk Barneblad from 1902. He is best remembered for his children's books, such as Paa sjølvstyr from 1892, Ungar from 1892, Kor vart det av jola? from 1894, Smaagutar from 1897, Det store nashorne from 1900, and Kvitebjørnen from 1906. Løland died of tuberculosis at 46 years of age and was buried at Asker cemetery.
