= Without Memory =

- Developer: Dino Games
- Director: Anton Slaschev
- Producer: Arkadiy Kulikov
- Designer: Arkadiy Kulikov
- Engine: Unreal Engine 4
- Platform: PlayStation 4
- Release: TBA
- Genre: Interactive drama
- Mode: Single-player video game

Without Memory is a single-player third person interactive psychological thriller video game, being developed by Russian studio Dino Games for the video game console PlayStation 4.

== About the game ==
The main key feature of the game will be a non-linear narrative that supposes multiple endings. This variety will be reached due to three playable characters, each of which could be killed or survive depending on the player decisions. The developers call the French studio Quantic Dream and their third project — Heavy Rain — their mastermind.

The popular Motion Capture technology was used for creation animations for the characters. The motion capture sessions took place in a Moscow studio using special helmets. 50 cameras Vicon was used for motion capture.

== Plot ==
The main concept of the game is based on the idea of the existence of three parallel worlds. Player actions in one universe affect events in the other two.

The story begins in the dystopian universe, and its main character, Leo Evans, serves the police and he is a prominent representative of the consumer society. One day, when he returns home from work, in his apartment, he finds a detachment of the peacekeepers that takes his wife to the high-tech prison Animatorium for her assistance to the terrorist organization called "the Insiders". Unable to offer resistance and having lost his spouse, after some time, Leo changes his views and joins the Insiders to fight against the existing order. Soon he realizes that the root of the problem goes far beyond its home world...

== Characters ==
Leo Evans is the main character of the game. Originally, it is a typical representative of the consumer society, but later became a member of the anti-government organization "the Insiders". A Russian film and theatre actor Roman Kurtsyn played Leo.

Emily Evans is married to the main character and a member of the antigovernment organization "the Insiders". A Russian actress Tatiana Kosmacheva portrayed the role of Emily.

== Gameplay ==
The Gameplay of Without Memory will be divided into three parts.

An exploration of the game world (the current level). The player can interact with many characters and objects, as well as listen to the thoughts of the main character in any situation.

Interactive videos. They include divergent dialogues with other characters or dynamic scenes with elements of Quick Time Events (QTE). The Touchpad of the Game controller DualShock 4 will be used for dialogues and QTE – the player will use it to select the desired response options or perform certain actions.

Puzzles. They include solving different logical puzzles by the player.
