= Ole Gabriel Kverneland =

Ole Gabriel Gabrielsen Kverneland (29 May 1854 – 11 May 1941) was a Norwegian ploughsmith and factory owner. He was the founder of the Kverneland Group.

== Personal life ==
Kverneland was born at Time in Rogaland, Norway. He was a son of farmer and blacksmith Gabriel Olsen Kverneland and Marta Bore. He was the second youngest among twelve siblings. He married Serina Larsdatter Skjelset in 1876; she died in 1879. In 1880 he married Anna Malena Aadnesdatter Aasland.

== Career ==
After primary school, Kverneland attended Adolph Budde's agricultural school in Austrått in Høyland Municipality during 1870. In 1874 he received a traveling grant, and visited Denmark and Sweden, in addition to travels in Norway. He was particularly impressed and inspired by an automatic hammer installed in a factory at Eskilstuna in Södermanland County, Sweden .

He established the factory Kverneland Fabrikk in 1879 in the village of Kvernaland in Time . The factory was located at Frøyland near the lake of Frøylandsvatnet, and utilized waterfalls from Frøylandsåna. The main products from the factory were scythes, sickles and ploughs. The Jæren Line had opened in 1878, the year before the startup of the factory, and boats were used to cross Frøylandsvatnet to reach Klepp stasjon, the village that developed around the railway station. In addition to running the factory, Kverneland was also responsible for the local post office. From around 1905 the company gradually expanded in size, and in the 1920s it was the largest manufacturer of ploughs in Norway. The Kverneland Group eventually developed to be among the world leading manufacturing companies of agriculture equipment to the farming community.

Kverneland participated in local politics and development. He was elected to the municipal council of Time Municipality, and was a co-founder of the local savings bank, Time sparebank. He was chairman of the construction committee for the local electricity supply, and chaired Jæderens Skogplantingsselskap. He was decorated Knight, First Class of the Order of St. Olav in 1938.
