= Orkel =

Norwegian manufacturing company

Orkel AS
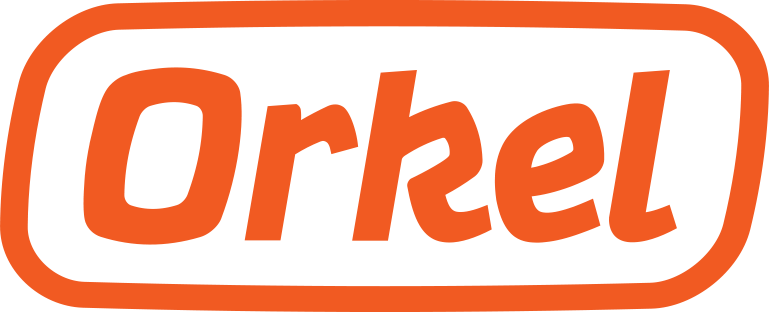
- Company type: Aksjeselskap
- Founded: 1949
- Headquarters: Orkland Municipality
- Key people: Jarl Gjønnes (CEO); Johan Gjønnes (Founder)
- Products: Compactors
- Number of employees: 63 (2026)
- Website: https://orkel.com/

Orkel AS is a Norwegian company that produces heavy machinery. Orkel is located in Orkland Municipality, in close vicinity to Trondheim. The company was established in 1949 by Johan Gjønnes. It is one of the largest industrial companies in the county of Trøndelag. Orkel is, together with Kverneland Group among the largest producers machinery in Norway.

The main product in the international market is the Compactor. Orkel exports the compactor to more than 40 countries.

The company is one of the biggest manufacturers in its segment in Norway

== History ==
At a certain time, Orkel sold the mower and other forage equipment division to Slovenian manufacturer SIP
