= Marta Steinsvik =

Norwegian author and translator

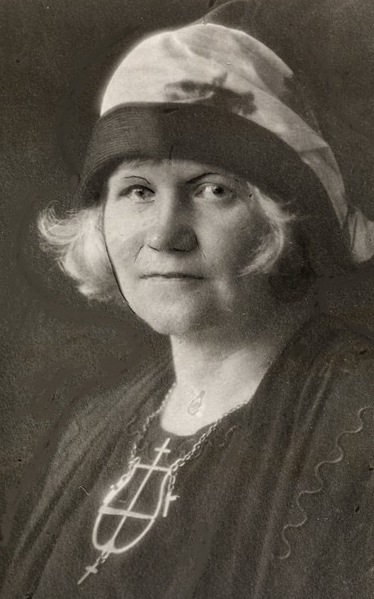
Marta Steinsvik

Marta Steinsvik (23 March 1877 – 27 July 1950) was a Norwegian author and translator. She was a champion of women's rights, a proponent of antisemitism and anti-Catholicism, and promoter of the use of Nynorsk. She was the first female to graduate from the Norwegian School of Theology.

== Biography ==
Steinsvik was born in Flekkefjord. She studied medicine in Kristiania, but never finished her studies because she was against vivisection. She studied several other subjects including Egyptology in London. In 1902, Marta Steinsvik studied oriental languages including Assyrian and ancient Egyptian. She also became interested in Esotericism. She was influenced by the thinking of both English Theosophist, Annie Besant and Austrian philosopher, Rudolf Steiner. She was the first woman to graduate from the Norwegian School of Theology, but was not allowed to practice. She was the first Norwegian woman to preach in a church, during 1910 at the Grønland Church in Oslo. She was invited to an international women's conference in Geneva, and planned to give a talk on women priests, until the Pope forbade all Catholic women to attend if she did, forcing her to give a speech on another subject.

In 1894, she started writing in the newspaper, Den 17de Mai, which had been started that same year by her future husband Rasmus Steinsvik. She was employed as secretary to Hans Tambs Lyche, editor and founder of the cultural journal Kringsjaa'. In 1910 she became editor of the paper Kringsjaa. She was multilingual and translated several books into Nynorsk, including Personal Recollections of Joan of Arc, by the Sieur Louis de Conte written by Mark Twain and Quo vadis? written by Henryk Sienkiewicz.

In the early 1920s, she was active in spreading antisemitism and was one of the most important proponents of antisemitism in Norway. Among other things, she delivered lectures based on the Protocols of the Elders of Zion.

In 1928, she published an anti-Catholic book Sankt Peters himmelnøkler ("Saint Peter's keys to Heaven").

Marta published Frimodige ytringer, ("Frank Speech") in 1946. It was about the Norwegian treatment of suspects when they were punishing traitors after the Second World War. The book includes examples of Norwegian resistance movement torturing suspected Nazi sympathizers in the summer of 1945. It also discussed the legality of withdrawing a group's human rights, (those who were members of Nasjonal Samling, the Norwegian National Socialist party, after 9 April 1940), by an ex post facto law that set aside the Hague Convention which Norway had ratified.

The papers left behind on her death are currently being organised at the Norwegian cultural institution, The Blue Colour Works. Several people have announced their plans to write a book about Marta Steinsvik.

== Works ==
- Ben-Hur. Ei forteljing um Kristus, translation 1896 from english Ben-Hur. A tale of the Christ written by Lewis Wallace, Full text: Nasjonalbiblioteket, Oslo
- Nordan um folkeskikken elder Ei leikstemna tilfjells by Erp. (written 1898), 1901, Full text: Nasjonalbiblioteket, Oslo
- Jeanne d'Arc. Kva eg kjem ihug um henne, translation 1905 from english Personal Recollections of Joan of Arc, by the Sieur Louis de Conte by Mark Twain, Full text: Nasjonalbiblioteket, Oslo
- Ivan Mortensson: "Skogtroll", anmeldelse, 1906
- Ein liten adelsmann, translation 1909, from english Little Lord Fauntleroy by Frances Hodgson Burnett, Full text 1. edition: Nasjonalbiblioteket, Oslo
- Jerusalem 1 and 2, translation 1909 from swedish Jerusalem 1 and 2 by Selma Lagerlöf
- Ægteskabet og forplantningen, 1910, Full text: Nasjonalbiblioteket, Oslo
- Äktenskapet och fortplantningen, swedish translation by L. W. G. 1910
- Jeanne D'Arc : Orleans-møyi, new edition 1913 from english Personal Recollections of Joan of Arc, by the Sieur Louis de Conte by Mark Twain, Full text: Nasjonalbiblioteket, Oslo
- Kvendi og preste-embættet. Fyredrag halde paa landsmøtet for L. K. S. F. 8de juli 1916, 1917, Full text: Nasjonalbiblioteket, Oslo
- Det skapende "ord". Et foredrag av Credo, 1917, Full text: Nasjonalbiblioteket, Oslo
- Gammelægyptiske mysterie-indvielser, 1917, Full text: Nasjonalbiblioteket, Oslo
- Bispen. Eit sjæle-drama i 3 akter, 1918, Full text: Nasjonalbiblioteket, Oslo
- Isis-sløret. Mysterie-drama i 5 akter, 1921, Full text: Nasjonalbiblioteket, Oslo
- Ein liten adelsmann, translation 1909, 2. edition 1923 from english Little Lord Fauntleroy by Frances Hodgson Burnett, Full text 2. edition: Nasjonalbiblioteket, Oslo
- Eventyr. 1. Karavanen, translation 1923 from german Die Karawane by Wilhelm Hauff, Full text: Nasjonalbiblioteket, Oslo
- Sankt Peters himmelnøkler, 1928, 2. edition 1930, 3. edition 1932, Full text 1. edition: Nasjonalbiblioteket, Oslo
- Hellig Olav og Den norske statskirke, 1930, Full text: Nasjonalbiblioteket, Oslo
- Kvinner som prester, 1934
- Kvinnornas självmordspolitik. Barnbegränsning och kvinnornas andra ungdom, in swedish 1938, Full text: Nasjonalbiblioteket, Oslo
- Kreftens gåte, 1940, 2. oplag 1944
- Tang og tare som vitaminkilde, 1943, 2. edition 1944, Full text 2. edition: Nasjonalbiblioteket, Oslo
- "Frimodige ytringer", 1946, Full text: Nasjonalbiblioteket, Oslo

== Personal life ==
She was born Marta Tonstad on the Skjeggestad farm in Bakke Municipality (now part of Flekkefjord Municipality in Agder county), Norway. Both of her parents Torkild Tonstad (1852–1908) and Ingeborg Evertsdatter Haugan (1848–1922) came from old farming families. Her father worked as a teacher in Flekkefjord and owned the farm Skjeggestad, where Marta lived until she was three years old.

On 16 May 1896, she married Rasmus Steinsvik (1863–1913), the founder and editor of Den 17de Mai. She had problems in childbirth and her doctor told her a sixth child would be likely to kill her, so she moved away from her husband. Her husband had a friend who was a doctor who diagnosed her as insane as soon as he heard she believed in reincarnation, and her husband had her committed. While institutionalized, she took the opportunity to study psychology. Another doctor became interested in her case and was able to get her released. This episode was often later used against her in newspaper debates. Her husband died in 1913 after an operation, barely 50 years old.
