= Bryne Church =

Church in Rogaland, Norway

- Bryne kyrkje
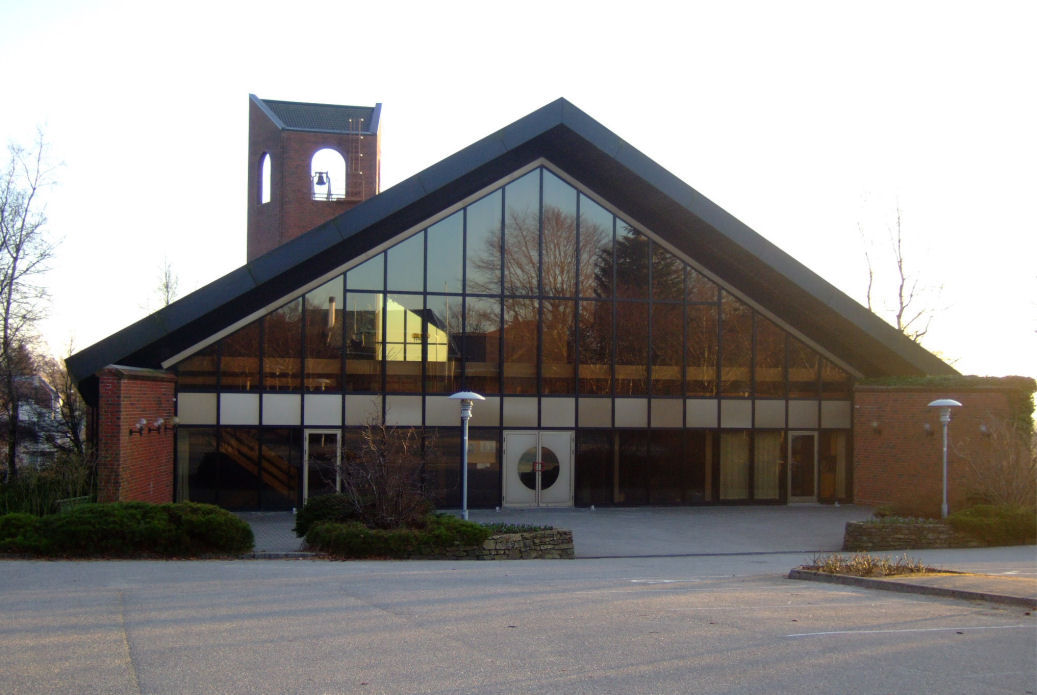
- View of the church
- Bryne Church
- 58.737247°N 05.644728°E
- Location: Time Municipality, Rogaland
- Country: Norway
- Denomination: Church of Norway
- Churchmanship: Evangelical Lutheran

History
- Status: Parish church
- Founded: 1979
- Consecrated: 1979

Architecture
- Functional status: Active
- Architect: Per Stokholm
- Architectural type: Long church
- Completed: 1979 (47 years ago)

Specifications
- Capacity: 450
- Materials: Brick

Administration
- Diocese: Stavanger bispedømme
- Deanery: Jæren prosti
- Parish: Bryne

Bryne Church (Norwegian: Bryne kyrkje) is a parish church of the Church of Norway in Time Municipality in Rogaland county, Norway. It is located in the town of Bryne. It is the church for the Bryne parish which is part of the Jæren prosti (deanery) in the Diocese of Stavanger. The red, brick church was built in a long church style in 1979 using designs by the architect Per Stokholm. The church seats about 450 people.

== See also ==
- List of churches in Rogaland
