= Mannfolk =

1886 novel by Arne Garborg

Mannfolk is a novel from 1886 by Norwegian writer Arne Garborg.

The novel is set in Norway's capital Christiania, and is a fierce attack on the sexual education of the time. It describes the life of a number of down-and-out men who belong to the artistic circles of the city.

After the confiscation of Hans Jæger's 1885 novel Fra Kristiania-Bohêmen and Christian Krohg's 1886 novel Albertine, Garborg begged the Government that his novel Mannfolk please also be confiscated. That did not happen, but instead Garborg lost his position as state auditor, as he was not reelected in 1887.
