= Time Church =

Church in Rogaland, Norway

- Time kyrkje
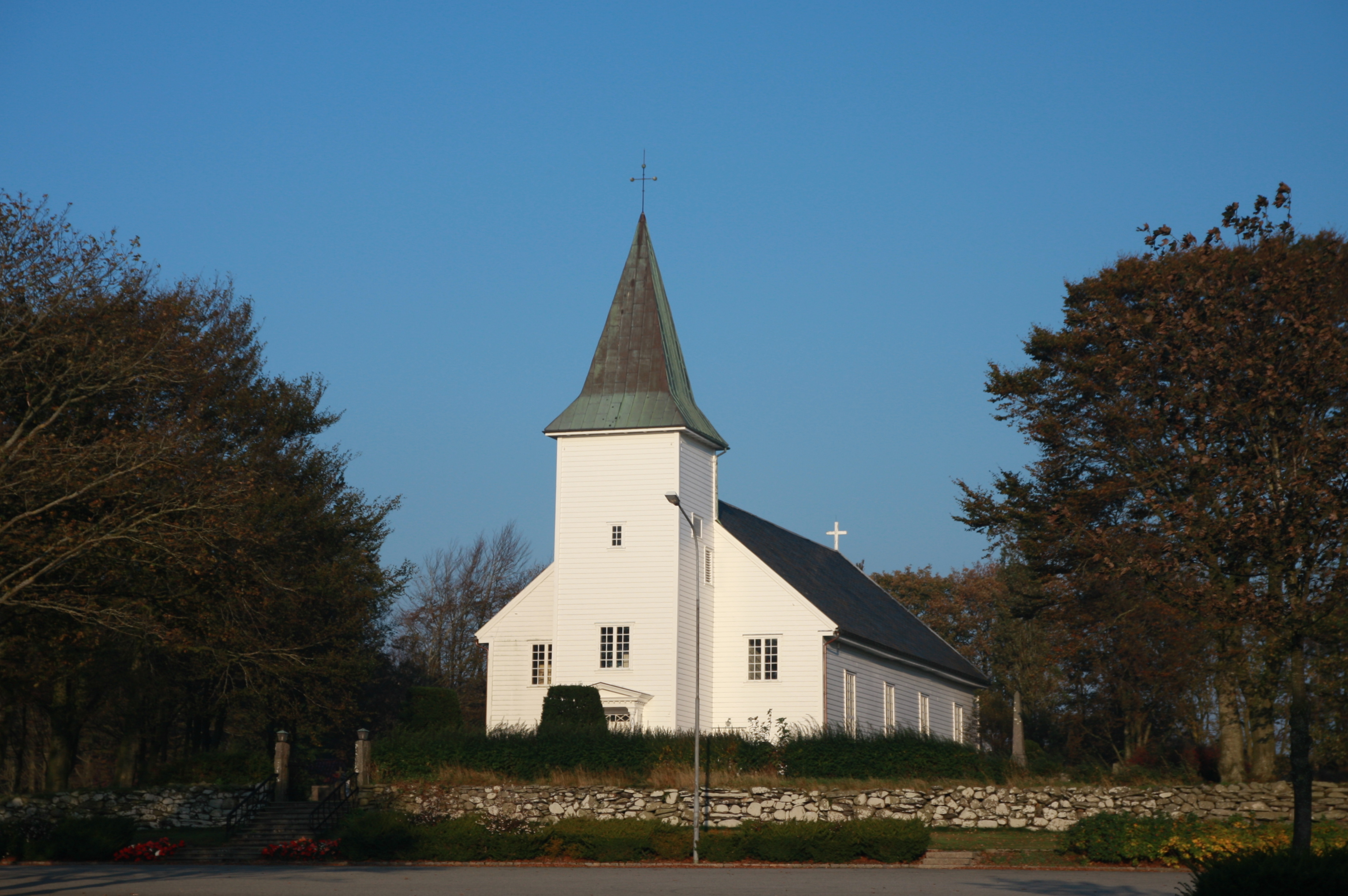
- View of the church
- Time Church
- 58.7263767°N 05.695644°E
- Location: Time Municipality, Rogaland
- Country: Norway
- Denomination: Church of Norway
- Churchmanship: Evangelical Lutheran

History
- Status: Parish church
- Founded: 13th century
- Consecrated: 1859

Architecture
- Functional status: Active
- Architect: Hans Linstow
- Architectural type: Long church
- Completed: 1859 (167 years ago)

Specifications
- Capacity: 700
- Materials: Wood

Administration
- Diocese: Stavanger bispedømme
- Deanery: Jæren prosti
- Parish: Time
- Norwegian Cultural Heritage Site
- Type: Church
- Status: Listed
- ID: 85622

Time Church (Norwegian: Time kyrkje) is a parish church of the Church of Norway in Time Municipality in Rogaland county, Norway. It is located in the village of Time, just a short distance east of the town of Bryne. It is the church for the Time parish which is part of the Jæren prosti (deanery) in the Diocese of Stavanger. The white, wooden church was built in a long church style in 1859 using designs by the architect Hans Linstow. The church seats about 700 people.

== History ==
The earliest existing historical records of the church date back to the year 1319, but the church was not new at that time. The first church on this site was likely a stave church built during the 13th century. The stave church was in use for several centuries until 1627 when it was torn down. A new long church was built on the same site which was completed in the early 1630s.

In 1814, this church served as an election church (Norwegian: valgkirke). Together with more than 300 other parish churches across Norway, it was a polling station for elections to the 1814 Norwegian Constituent Assembly which wrote the Constitution of Norway. This was Norway's first national elections. Each church parish was a constituency that elected people called "electors" who later met together in each county to elect the representatives for the assembly that was to meet at Eidsvoll Manor later that year.

In 1829, the church was torn down and a new church was again rebuilt on the same site. The new church was consecrated in 1830. In 1858, the church was struck by lightning and it burned to the ground. The following year, 1859, a new church was completed on the same site.

== See also ==
- List of churches in Rogaland
