= Time Municipality =

Municipality in Rogaland, Norway

Time Municipality Time kommune
- Municipality
- Thime herred (historic name)
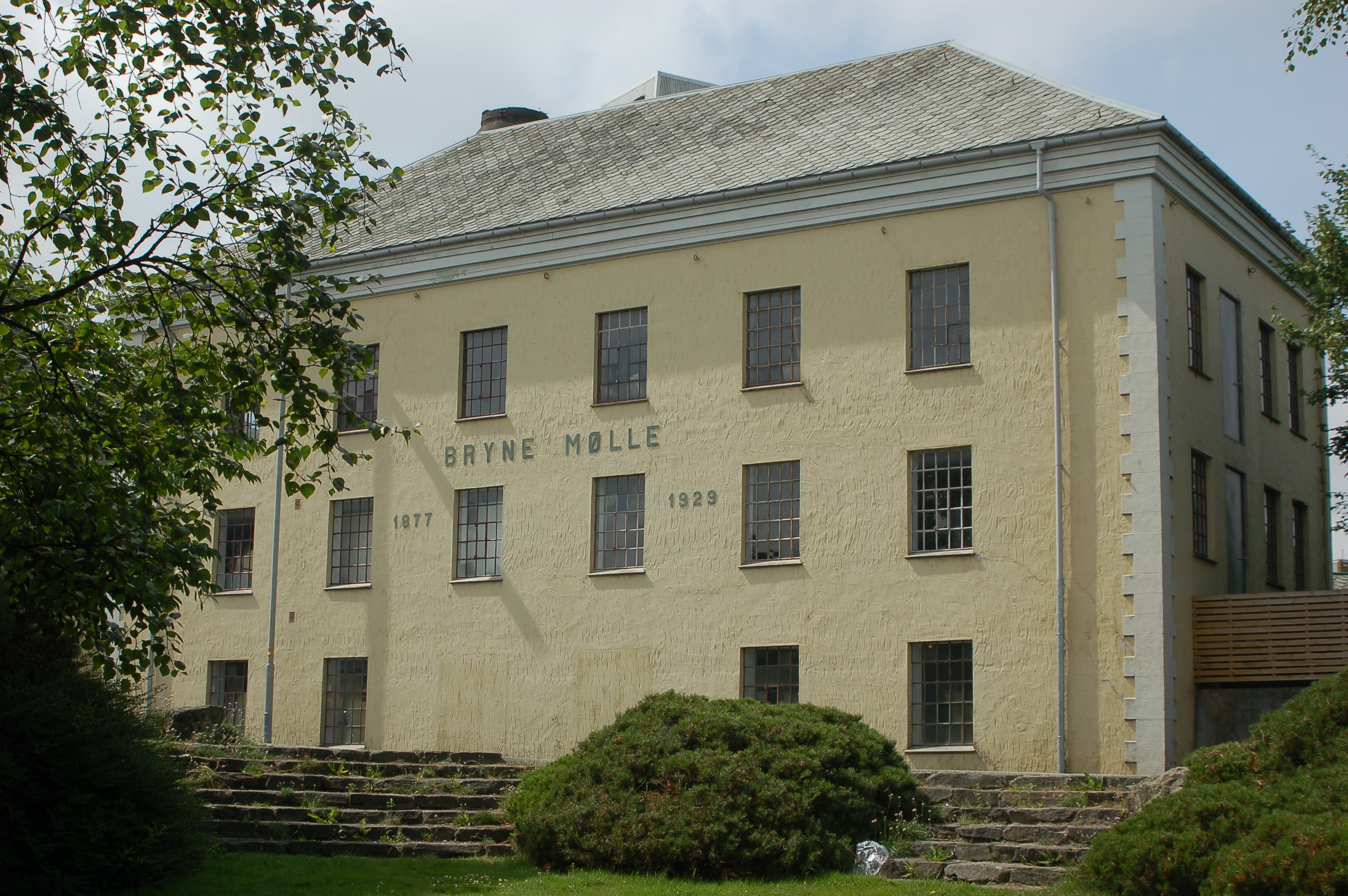
- View of a building in the town of Bryne

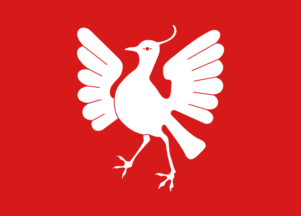
- Flag Coat of arms

- Rogaland within Norway

- Time within Rogaland
- Coordinates: 58°43′22″N 05°45′55″E
- Country: Norway
- County: Rogaland
- District: Jæren
- Established: 1 Jan 1838
  - Created as: Formannskapsdistrikt
- Administrative centre: Bryne

Government
  - Mayor (2020): Andreas Vollsund (H)

Area
  - Total: 183.18 km^{2} (70.73 sq mi)
  - Land: 170.45 km^{2} (65.81 sq mi)
  - Water: 12.73 km^{2} (4.92 sq mi) 6.9%
  - Rank: #311 in Norway
- Highest elevation: 430.24 m (1,411.5 ft)

Population (2026)
  - Total: 20,461
  - Rank: #67 in Norway
  - Density: 111.7/km^{2} (289/sq mi)
  - Change (10 years): ▲ +10.2%
- Demonym: Timebu

Official language
  - Norwegian form: Nynorsk
- Time zone: UTC+01:00 (CET)
  - Summer (DST): UTC+02:00 (CEST)
- ISO 3166 code: NO-1121
- Website: Official website

Time is a municipality in Rogaland county, Norway. It is located in the traditional district of Jæren. The administrative centre of the municipality is the town of Bryne. Some villages in the municipality include Kvernaland, Lyefjell, Mossige, and Undheim. Most of Time Municipality is fairly flat and it is used for agriculture. The eastern portion of the municipality is more rugged moorland.

The 183.18-square-kilometre (70.73 sq mi) municipality is the 311th largest by area out of the 357 municipalities in Norway. Time Municipality is the 67th most populous municipality in Norway with a population of 20,461. The municipality's population density is 111.7 inhabitants per square kilometre (289/sq mi) and its population has increased by 10.2% over the previous 10-year period.

== General information ==
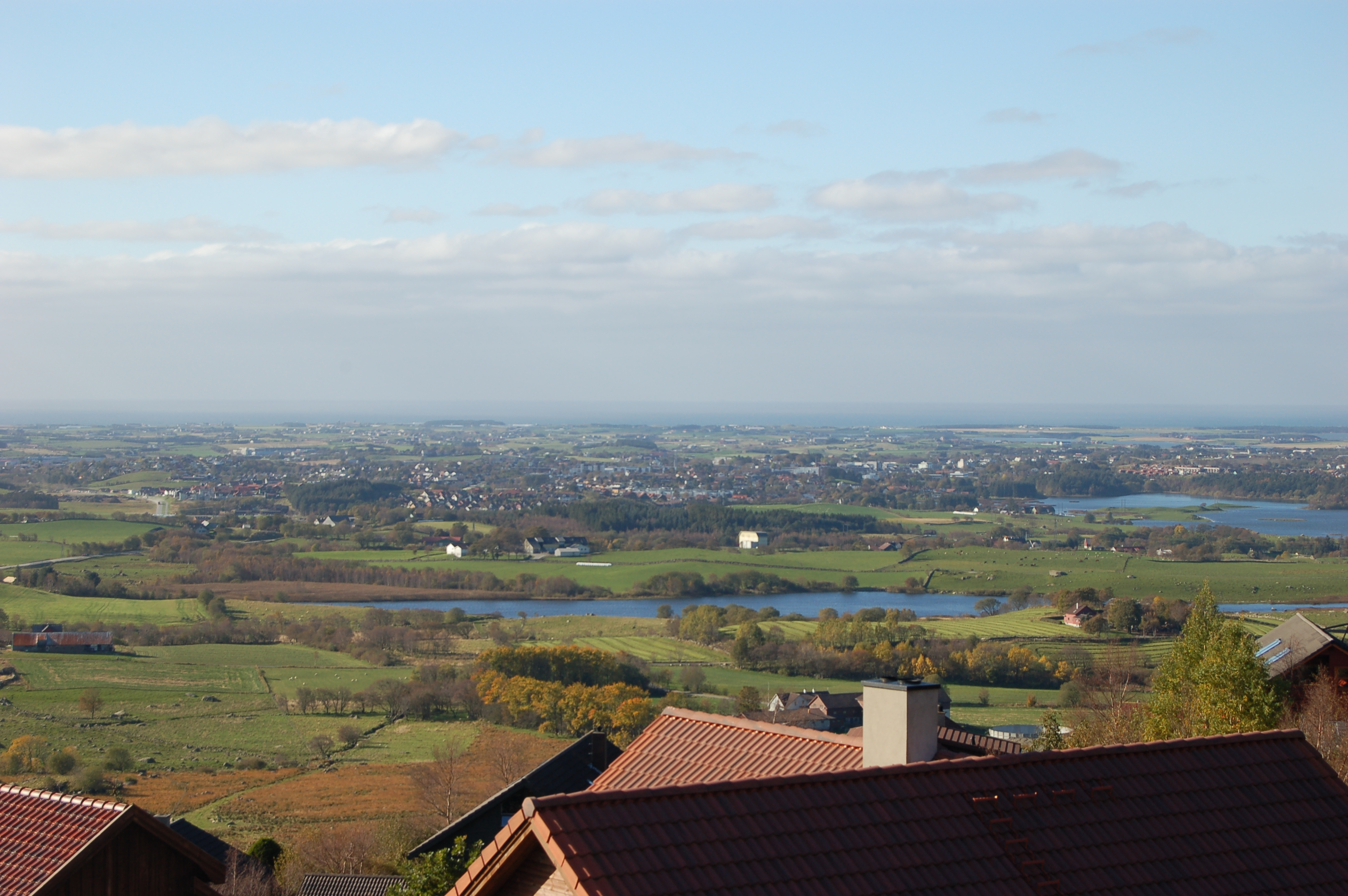
View from Lyefjell towards Bryne

The parish of "Thime" (later spelled Time) was established as a municipality on 1 January 1838 (see formannskapsdistrikt law). The municipal borders have been slightly changed twice since that time. On 1 January 1970, a small unpopulated area was moved from Time Municipality to Gjesdal Municipality. Then again on 1 January 1989 another unpopulated area was transferred to Gjesdal Municipality. Both times it was to make more room for the growing village of Ålgård in Gjesdal Municipality.

=== Name ===
The municipality (originally the parish) is named after the old Time farm (Old Norse: Þímin) since the first Time Church was built there. The meaning of the first element is uncertain. It may come from the Anglo-Saxon word Þínan which means "to get wet" or the Old Norse word þiðna which means "thawed" or "melted". Both possible meanings likely refer to the wet and marshy areas in Time. The last element is vin which means "meadow" or "pasture". Historically, the municipality name was spelled Thime, but the "h" was dropped as the Norwegian language was reformed over time.

=== Coat of arms ===
The coat of arms was granted on 23 December 1977. The blazon is "Gules, a lapwing rising argent" (Norwegian: På raud botn ei sølv vipe med utslegne vengjer). This means the arms have a red field (background) and the charge is a northern lapwing (Vanellus vanellus). The charge has a tincture of argent which means it is commonly colored white, but if it is made out of metal, then silver is used. This bird (known as a vipe in Norwegian) was chosen as a symbol for the municipality as it is a typical bird for the area. It is shown with wings upwards to symbolize optimism. The municipal flag has the same design as the coat of arms.

=== Churches ===
The Church of Norway has three parishes (sokn) within Time Municipality. It is part of the Jæren prosti (deanery) in the Diocese of Stavanger.

Churches in Time Municipality
Parish (sokn)	Church name	Location of the church	Year built
Bryne	Bryne Church	Bryne	1979
Time	Time Church	Time (just outside Bryne)	1859
Undheim	Undheim Church	Undheim	2001

== Geography ==
Time Municipality is located in the district of Jæren which is mostly flat and agricultural. The river Figgjoelva marks the northern border of Time with Sandnes Municipality. The large lake Frøylandsvatnet forms part of the northwest border with the neighboring Klepp Municipality. Hå Municipality is located to the southwest, Bjerkreim Municipality is located to the southeast, and Gjesdal Municipality is located to the east. The landlocked municipality also includes part of the "Høg-Jæren" ("high-Jæren") area which is not flat like the rest of the district. Høg-Jæren is more hilly, rugged, and less densely populated. The highest point in the municipality is the 430.24-metre (1,411.5 ft) tall mountain Brusaknuden.

== Government ==
Time Municipality is responsible for primary education (through 10th grade), outpatient health services, senior citizen services, welfare and other social services, zoning, economic development, and municipal roads and utilities. The municipality is governed by a municipal council of directly elected representatives. The mayor is indirectly elected by a vote of the municipal council. The municipality is under the jurisdiction of the Sør-Rogaland District Court and the Gulating Court of Appeal.

=== Municipal council ===
The municipal council (Kommunestyre) of Time Municipality is made up of 27 representatives that are elected to four-year terms. The tables below show the current and historical composition of the council by political party.

Time kommunestyre 2023–2027
Party name (in Nynorsk)	Number of representatives
Labour Party (Arbeidarpartiet)	3
Progress Party (Framstegspartiet)	3
Conservative Party (Høgre)	10
Industry and Business Party (Industri‑ og Næringspartiet)	1
Christian Democratic Party (Kristeleg Folkeparti)	3
Centre Party (Senterpartiet)	4
Socialist Left Party (Sosialistisk Venstreparti)	2
Liberal Party (Venstre)	1
Total number of members:	27

Time kommunestyre 2019–2023
Party name (in Nynorsk)	Number of representatives
Labour Party (Arbeidarpartiet)	5
Progress Party (Framstegspartiet)	3
Green Party (Miljøpartiet Dei Grøne)	1
Conservative Party (Høgre)	7
Christian Democratic Party (Kristeleg Folkeparti)	3
Centre Party (Senterpartiet)	5
Socialist Left Party (Sosialistisk Venstreparti)	2
Liberal Party (Venstre)	1
Total number of members:	27

Time kommunestyre 2015–2019
Party name (in Nynorsk)	Number of representatives
Labour Party (Arbeidarpartiet)	5
Progress Party (Framstegspartiet)	3
Green Party (Miljøpartiet Dei Grøne)	1
Conservative Party (Høgre)	8
Christian Democratic Party (Kristeleg Folkeparti)	4
Centre Party (Senterpartiet)	4
Socialist Left Party (Sosialistisk Venstreparti)	1
Liberal Party (Venstre)	1
Total number of members:	27

Time kommunestyre 2011–2015
Party name (in Nynorsk)	Number of representatives
Labour Party (Arbeidarpartiet)	4
Progress Party (Framstegspartiet)	3
Conservative Party (Høgre)	10
Christian Democratic Party (Kristeleg Folkeparti)	4
Centre Party (Senterpartiet)	4
Socialist Left Party (Sosialistisk Venstreparti)	1
Liberal Party (Venstre)	1
Total number of members:	27

Time kommunestyre 2007–2011
Party name (in Nynorsk)	Number of representatives
Labour Party (Arbeidarpartiet)	6
Progress Party (Framstegspartiet)	5
Conservative Party (Høgre)	5
Christian Democratic Party (Kristeleg Folkeparti)	5
Centre Party (Senterpartiet)	3
Socialist Left Party (Sosialistisk Venstreparti)	2
Liberal Party (Venstre)	1
Total number of members:	27

Time kommunestyre 2003–2007
Party name (in Nynorsk)	Number of representatives
Labour Party (Arbeidarpartiet)	4
Progress Party (Framstegspartiet)	7
Conservative Party (Høgre)	5
Christian Democratic Party (Kristeleg Folkeparti)	5
Centre Party (Senterpartiet)	4
Socialist Left Party (Sosialistisk Venstreparti)	2
Total number of members:	27

Time kommunestyre 1999–2003
Party name (in Nynorsk)	Number of representatives
Labour Party (Arbeidarpartiet)	7
Progress Party (Framstegspartiet)	6
Conservative Party (Høgre)	6
Christian Democratic Party (Kristeleg Folkeparti)	8
Centre Party (Senterpartiet)	5
Socialist Left Party (Sosialistisk Venstreparti)	1
Liberal Party (Venstre)	2
Total number of members:	35

Time kommunestyre 1995–1999
Party name (in Nynorsk)	Number of representatives
Labour Party (Arbeidarpartiet)	7
Progress Party (Framstegspartiet)	5
Conservative Party (Høgre)	6
Christian Democratic Party (Kristeleg Folkeparti)	7
Centre Party (Senterpartiet)	7
Socialist Left Party (Sosialistisk Venstreparti)	1
Liberal Party (Venstre)	2
Total number of members:	35

Time kommunestyre 1991–1995
Party name (in Nynorsk)	Number of representatives
Labour Party (Arbeidarpartiet)	6
Progress Party (Framstegspartiet)	4
Conservative Party (Høgre)	7
Christian Democratic Party (Kristeleg Folkeparti)	6
Centre Party (Senterpartiet)	8
Socialist Left Party (Sosialistisk Venstreparti)	3
Liberal Party (Venstre)	1
Total number of members:	35

Time kommunestyre 1987–1991
Party name (in Nynorsk)	Number of representatives
Labour Party (Arbeidarpartiet)	8
Progress Party (Framstegspartiet)	4
Conservative Party (Høgre)	9
Christian Democratic Party (Kristeleg Folkeparti)	6
Centre Party (Senterpartiet)	5
Socialist Left Party (Sosialistisk Venstreparti)	1
Joint list of the Liberal Party (Venstre) and Liberal People's Party (Liberale Folkepartiet)	2
Total number of members:	35

Time kommunestyre 1983–1987
Party name (in Nynorsk)	Number of representatives
Labour Party (Arbeidarpartiet)	9
Progress Party (Framstegspartiet)	3
Conservative Party (Høgre)	9
Christian Democratic Party (Kristeleg Folkeparti)	6
Centre Party (Senterpartiet)	6
Socialist Left Party (Sosialistisk Venstreparti)	1
Liberal Party (Venstre)	1
Total number of members:	35

Time kommunestyre 1979–1983
Party name (in Nynorsk)	Number of representatives
Labour Party (Arbeidarpartiet)	6
Conservative Party (Høgre)	10
Christian Democratic Party (Kristeleg Folkeparti)	6
Centre Party (Senterpartiet)	6
Liberal Party (Venstre)	1
Total number of members:	29

Time kommunestyre 1975–1979
Party name (in Nynorsk)	Number of representatives
Labour Party (Arbeidarpartiet)	7
Anders Lange's Party (Anders Langes parti)	1
Conservative Party (Høgre)	6
Christian Democratic Party (Kristeleg Folkeparti)	6
New People's Party (Nye Folkepartiet)	1
Centre Party (Senterpartiet)	8
Total number of members:	29

Time kommunestyre 1971–1975
Party name (in Nynorsk)	Number of representatives
Labour Party (Arbeidarpartiet)	7
Conservative Party (Høgre)	4
Christian Democratic Party (Kristeleg Folkeparti)	5
Centre Party (Senterpartiet)	10
Liberal Party (Venstre)	3
Total number of members:	29

Time kommunestyre 1967–1971
Party name (in Nynorsk)	Number of representatives
Labour Party (Arbeidarpartiet)	7
Conservative Party (Høgre)	3
Christian Democratic Party (Kristeleg Folkeparti)	4
Centre Party (Senterpartiet)	8
Liberal Party (Venstre)	3
Total number of members:	25

Time kommunestyre 1963–1967
Party name (in Nynorsk)	Number of representatives
Labour Party (Arbeidarpartiet)	7
Conservative Party (Høgre)	3
Christian Democratic Party (Kristeleg Folkeparti)	4
Centre Party (Senterpartiet)	7
Liberal Party (Venstre)	3
Local List(s) (Lokale lister)	1
Total number of members:	25

Time heradsstyre 1959–1963
Party name (in Nynorsk)	Number of representatives
Labour Party (Arbeidarpartiet)	6
Conservative Party (Høgre)	2
Christian Democratic Party (Kristeleg Folkeparti)	4
Centre Party (Senterpartiet)	8
Liberal Party (Venstre)	3
Local List(s) (Lokale lister)	2
Total number of members:	25

Time heradsstyre 1955–1959
Party name (in Nynorsk)	Number of representatives
Labour Party (Arbeidarpartiet)	5
Conservative Party (Høgre)	2
Christian Democratic Party (Kristeleg Folkeparti)	4
Farmers' Party (Bondepartiet)	9
Liberal Party (Venstre)	3
Local List(s) (Lokale lister)	2
Total number of members:	25

Time heradsstyre 1951–1955
Party name (in Nynorsk)	Number of representatives
Labour Party (Arbeidarpartiet)	5
Conservative Party (Høgre)	1
Christian Democratic Party (Kristeleg Folkeparti)	3
Liberal Party (Venstre)	2
Joint List(s) of Non-Socialist Parties (Borgarlege Felleslister)	9
Total number of members:	20

Time heradsstyre 1947–1951
Party name (in Nynorsk)	Number of representatives
Labour Party (Arbeidarpartiet)	4
Conservative Party (Høgre)	1
Christian Democratic Party (Kristeleg Folkeparti)	2
Local List(s) (Lokale lister)	13
Total number of members:	20

Time heradsstyre 1945–1947
Party name (in Nynorsk)	Number of representatives
Labour Party (Arbeidarpartiet)	5
Local List(s) (Lokale lister)	15
Total number of members:	20

Time heradsstyre 1937–1941*
Party name (in Nynorsk)	Number of representatives
Labour Party (Arbeidarpartiet)	4
Joint List(s) of Non-Socialist Parties (Borgarlege Felleslister)	8
Local List(s) (Lokale lister)	4
Total number of members:	16
Note: Due to the German occupation of Norway during World War II, no elections were held for new municipal councils until after the war ended in 1945.

=== Mayors ===
The mayor (Nynorsk: ordførar) of Time Municipality is the political leader of the municipality and the chairperson of the municipal council. The following people have held this position:

- 1838–1841: Ingebret Svennsson Mossige
- 1841–1843: Aadne Larsen Søiland
- 1844–1845: Ommund Svendsen Norum
- 1846–1847: Reier Torkelsen Norem
- 1848–1851: Aande Larsen Søiland
- 1852–1855: Reier Torkelsen Norem
- 1856–1862: Ommund Svendsen Norum
- 1863–1865: Reier Torkelsen Norem
- 1866–1869: Christopher C. Aasland
- 1870–1875: Reier Torkelsen Norem
- 1876–1877: Hans Evensen Hognestad
- 1878–1879: Stoffer C. Aasland
- 1880–1881: Lars Børgesen Løge
- 1882–1883: Stoffer C. Aasland
- 1884–1889: Lars Børgesen Løge
- 1890–1892: Hans Evensen Hognestad
- 1893–1901: Karl Helgesen Aanestad
- 1902–1910: Jon Ivarsen Hognestad
- 1911–1918: Eivind Hansen Hognestad
- 1919–1925: Nils Martinsen Kverneland (Bp)
- 1926–1931: Thore Nilsen Kalberg
- 1932–1941: Gunnar Aasland (Bp)
- 1942–1944: Nils T. Kalberg (NS)
- 1945–1954: Gunnar Aasland (Bp)
- 1955–1959: Bjarne Undheim (Sp)
- 1959–1963: Nils A. Undheim (Ap)
- 1964–1967: Christian Aasland (Sp)
- 1967–1969: Bert Tungland (V)
- 1969–1983: Børge N. Undheim (Sp)
- 1983–1987: Ingulf Bergstad (H)
- 1987–1991: Arthur Løvik (KrF)
- 1991–1995: Ingulf Bergstad (H)
- 1995–1999: Inge Haugland (Sp)
- 1999–2011: Arnfinn Vigrestad (KrF)
- 2011–2020: Reinert Kverneland (H)
- 2020–present: Andreas Vollsund (H)

== Population ==
Historical population

Year	Pop.	±% p.a.
1845	2,103	—
1855	2,350	+1.12%
1865	2,376	+0.11%
1875	2,520	+0.59%
1891	2,701	+0.43%
1900	2,889	+0.75%
1910	3,133	+0.81%

Year	Pop.	±% p.a.
1920	3,642	+1.52%
1930	4,029	+1.01%
1946	4,899	+1.23%
1951	5,206	+1.22%
1960	6,081	+1.74%
1970	8,013	+2.80%
1980	9,970	+2.21%

Year	Pop.	±% p.a.
1990	11,929	+1.81%
2000	13,317	+1.11%
2010	16,077	+1.90%
2020	18,916	+1.64%
2023	19,781	+1.50%

Source: Statistics Norway and Norwegian Historical Data Centre

== International relations ==
=== Twin towns/Sister cities ===
Time has sister city agreements with the following places:

- Alnwick, Northumberland, England, United Kingdom
- Älmhult, Kronoberg County, Sweden
- Lapinjärvi, Uusimaa, Finland
- Allerød, Zealand, Denmark

== Notable people ==
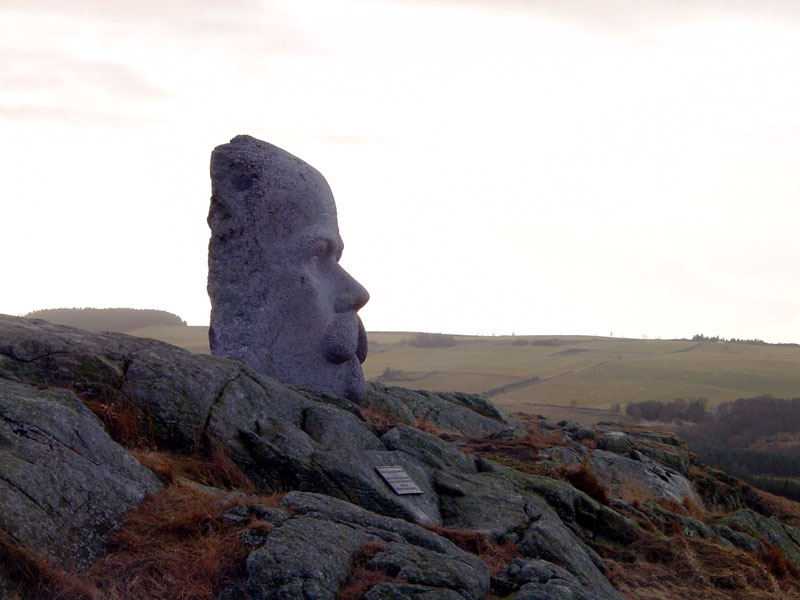
Stone sculpture of Arne Garborg, at his home in Knudaheio

- Arne Garborg (1851–1924), a writer who used Landsmål (now known as Nynorsk)
- Ole Gabriel Kverneland (1854–1941), a ploughsmith and factory owner who founded Kverneland Group
- Peter Hognestad (1866–1931), a Lutheran theologian, writer, and Bishop of Bjørgvin
- Fritz Røed (1928–2002), a sculptor who was famous for Sverd i fjell (English: Swords in Rock)
- Sølve Grotmol (1939–2010), a TV presenter for the Norwegian Broadcasting Corporation
- Janove Ottesen (born 1975), a musician and front figure of Kaizers Orchestra who grew up in Bryne
- Geir Zahl (born 1975), a musician and guitar player of Kaizers Orchestra
- Hanne Sigbjørnsen (born 1989), a cartoonist, blogger, and nurse

=== Sport ===
- Sissel Løchen (born 1969), a wheelchair curler, psychiatric nurse, and silver medallist at the 2018 Winter Paralympics
- Alf-Inge Haaland (born 1972), a former footballer who was raised in Bryne with 264 club caps and 34 for Norway
- Geir André Herrem (born 1988), a footballer with over 300 club caps
- Erling Haaland (born 2000), a footballer currently playing for Manchester City
