= Hulda Garborg =

Norwegian writer and politician

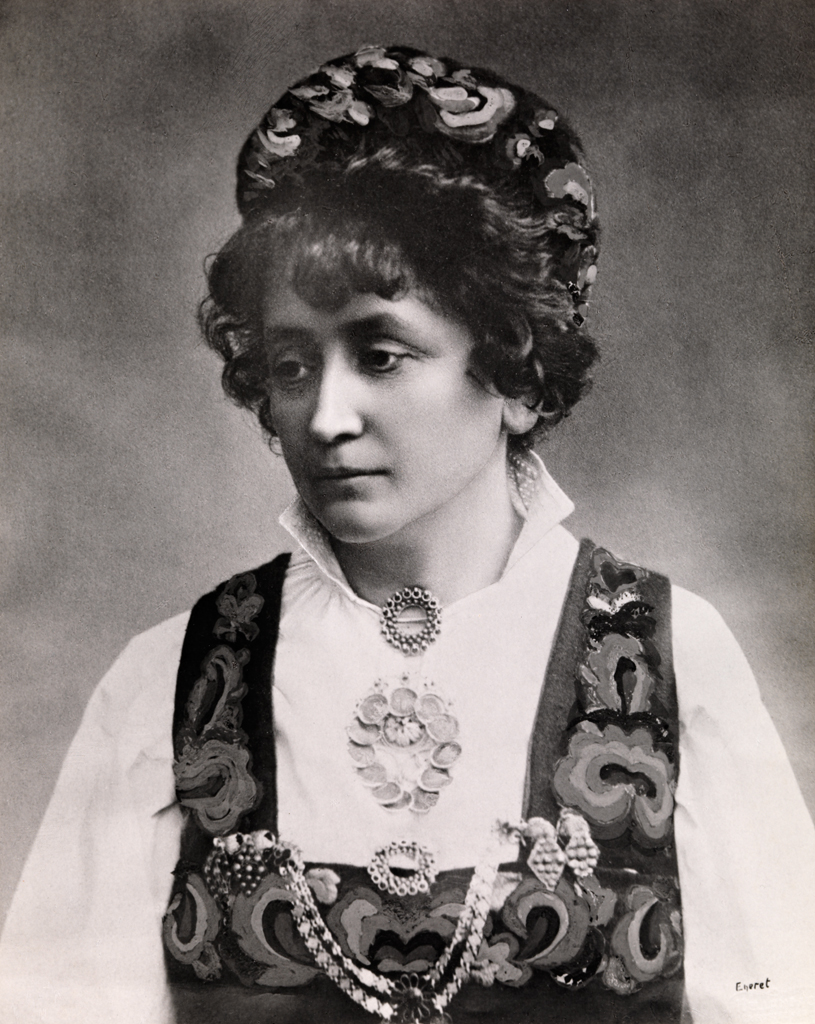
Hulda Garborg

Hulda Garborg (née Bergersen, 22 February 1862 – 5 November 1934) was a Norwegian writer, novelist, playwright, poet, folk dancer, and theatre instructor. She was married to Arne Garborg, and is today perhaps best known for kindling interest in the bunad tradition.

== Personal life ==
Karen Hulda Bergersen was born on the Såstad farm in Stange Municipality, Hedmark, to the lawyer Christian Frederik Bergersen (1829–1873) and his wife Marie Petrine Olsen (1835–1888). She had two elder sisters, Martha and Sophie. Her parents divorced when Hulda was two years old, and she moved to Hamar with her mother. The family later moved to Kristiania, when Hulda was twelve years old, and from she was seventeen she started working in a store, helping feed the family. During this period she was a central person among the radical youth in Kristiania. In 1887 she married writer Arne Garborg.

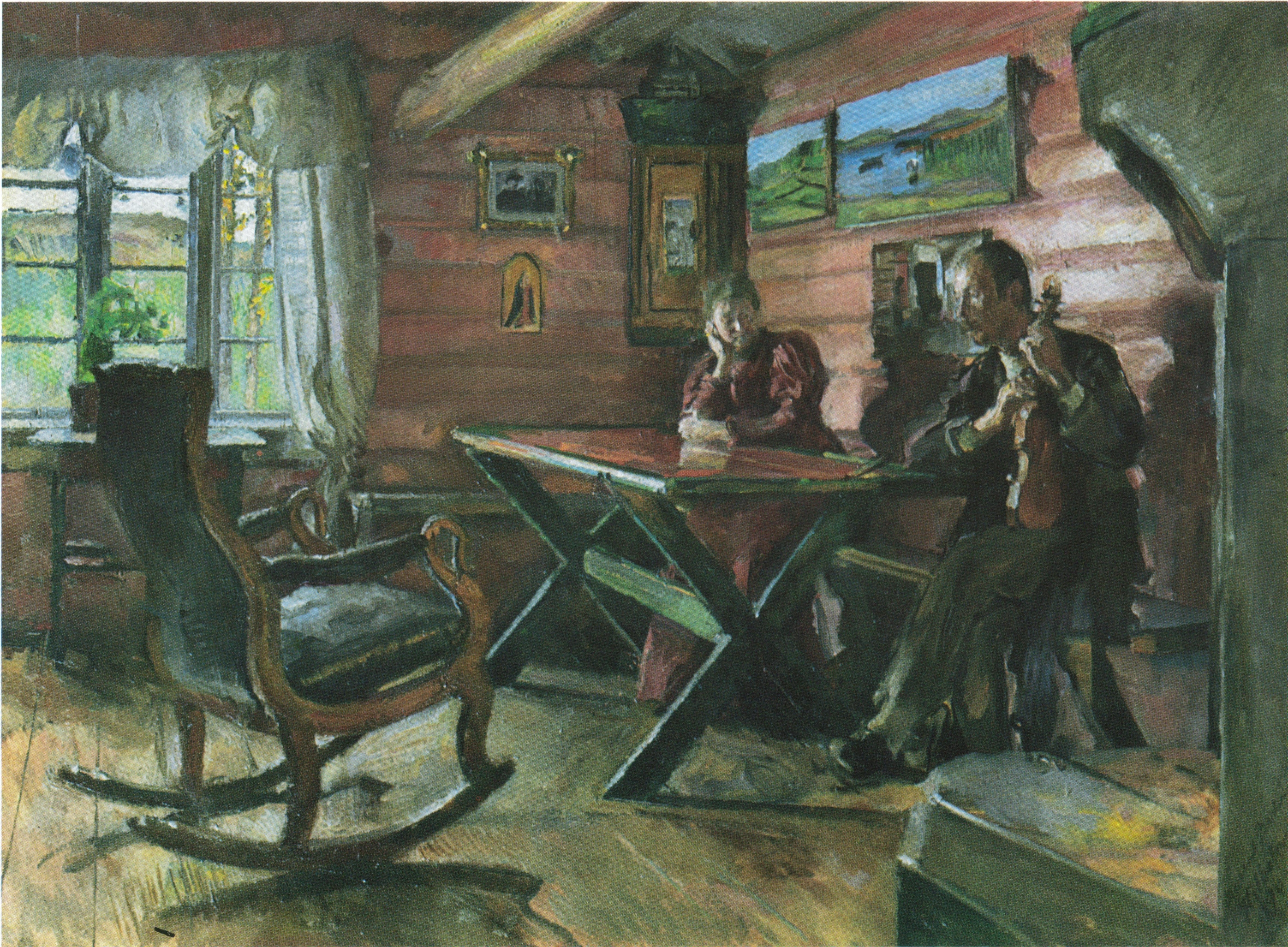
Hulda and Arne Garborg in their cabin at Kolbotn. Painting by Harriet Backer from 1896. The paintings on the wall are made by Kitty Kielland

The couple moved to Tynset Municipality in Østerdalen, where they lived for nine years in a small cabin at the small farm "Kolbotnen", near the lake Savalen. She gave birth to a child, Arne, also called Tuften, in 1888. During the period at Kolbotn, the family often visited Kristiania, they stayed longer periods in Dießen am Ammersee, Fürstenfeldbruck and Berlin in Germany, and also lived one winter in Paris. In 1896 they left Tynset and moved to Stokke Municipality. In 1897, they moved to Labraaten in Hvalstad, which became their home for the rest of their lives. Arne Garborg later built a summer residence, Knudaheio, in Time Municipality. Arne and Hulda were both buried at Knudaheio.

== Cultural work ==
Garborg was a pioneer in areas as theatre and folk dance, cooking, bunad tradition and women's rights.

She published articles about traditional cooking in the Nynorsk newspaper Den 17de Mai, and these articles were later published in the book Heimestell (1899).

She wrote the play Mødre (1895, performed at the Christiania Theatre), and the comedies Rationelt Fjøsstell (1896, performed both at the Christiania Theatre and in Bergen), Hos Lindelands (1899) and Noahs Ark (1899), and the dramas Sovande sorg (1900), Liti Kersti (1903), Edderkoppen (1904, anonymously; played at Nationaltheatret), Sigmund Bresteson (1908), Under Bodhitræet (1911) and Den store Freden (1919; issued in USA as Hiawatha's Vision, 1927). She founded Det norske spellaget in 1899, with its first performance in Eldorado Teater, and was co-founder of Det Norske Teatret. She edited the song book Norske folkevisor in 1903, and issued the book Song-Dansen i Nord-Landi, also in 1903, and Norske dansevisur (1913). She wrote the book Norsk klædebunad (1903), on the bunad tradition.

She participated in the contemporary debates both as a speaker and article writer. She wrote a series of articles in magazines and newspapers, such as Syn og Segn, Edda, Samtiden, Den 17de Mai, Dagbladet and Verdens Gang. The books Kvinden skabt af Manden (Woman created by Man, 1904) and Fru Evas Dagbog (1905) were contribution to the debate on women's rights.

Her first novel, Et frit Forhold, was issued anonymously in 1892. Her novel Eli (1912) was translated into Dutch in 1915, and into Swedish in 1916. Other novels were Mot Solen (1915), Gaaden. Efter Præstedatteren Else Marie Lindes Optegnelser (1916), Mens dansen gaar (1920), I huldreskog (1922), Naar heggen blomstrer (1923), Grågubben (1925), Trollheimen (1927), Helenes historie (1929) and Hildring (1931). She issued the poetry collections Kornmoe (1930) and Symra (1934).

She edited the diaries of her husband Arne Garborg, which were issued after his death. Selected parts from her own diaries were issued in 1962 as Dagbok 1903–1914.

Hulda Garborg also participated in politics, and represented the Liberal Left Party on the municipal council for Asker Municipality. She was appointed Knight, First Class of the Royal Norwegian Order of St. Olav in 1932.

== Biography ==
- Tor Obrestad, Hulda (1992)
