= Rasmus Steinsvik =

Rasmus Olai Steinsvik
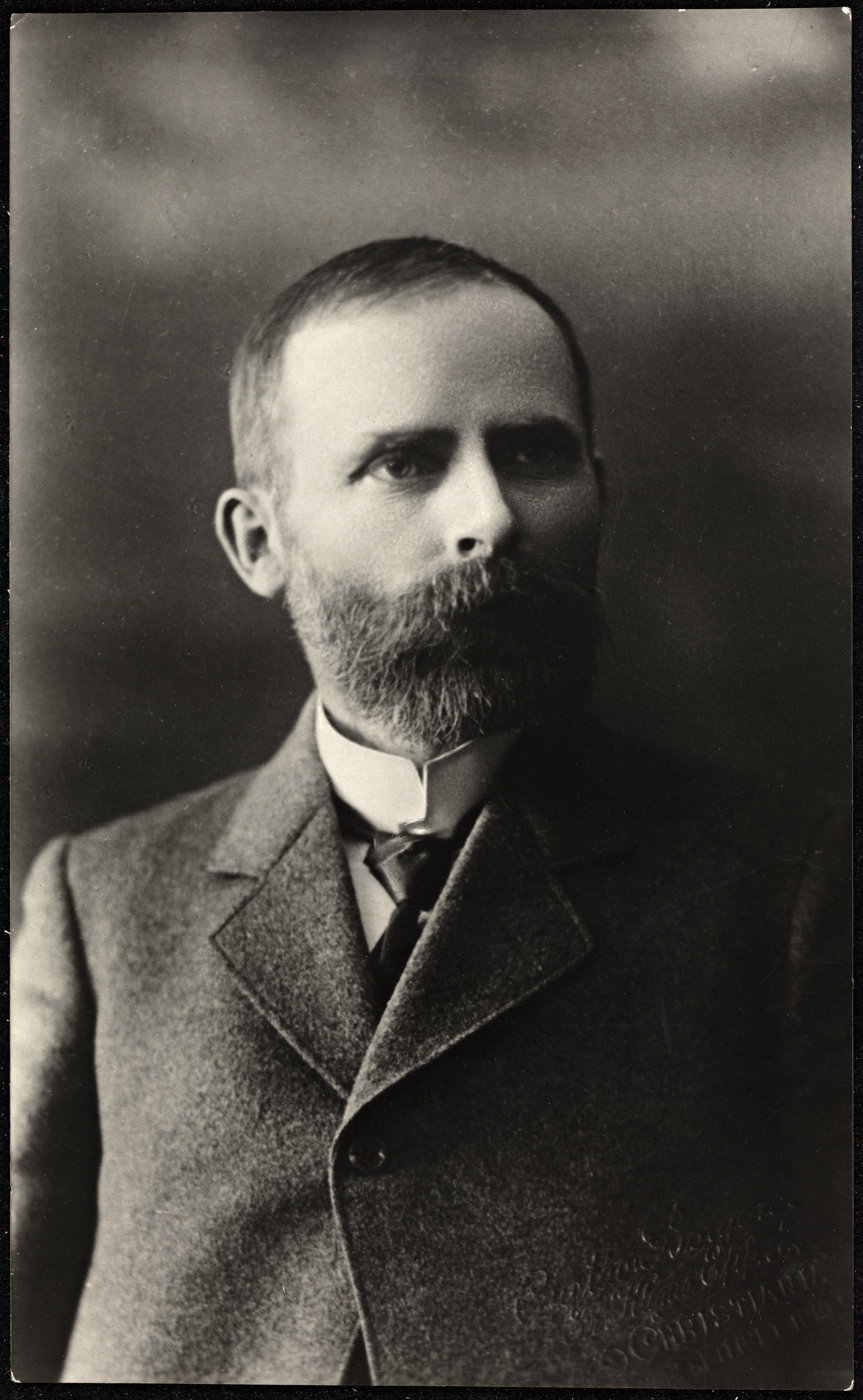
- Born: 22 September 1863; Volda, Norway
- Died: 22 June 1913 (aged 49); Oslo, Norway
- Burial place: Cemetery of Our Saviour
- Occupation(s): Writer, editor
- Known for: Editor of Fedraheimen; Founding editor of Den 17de Mai
- Spouse: Marta Steinsvik
- Children: Kjell Steinsvik

Rasmus Olai Steinsvik (22 September 1863 – 22 June 1913) was a Norwegian writer, magazine editor and newspaper editor. He was born in Volda Municipality, and was married to Marta Steinsvik. He edited the magazine Fedraheimen from 1889 to 1891, and started the newspaper Den 17de Mai in 1894, which he edited until his death. Among his literary works were Martyra from 1892, the story I dulsmaal from 1896, and Holmgang from 1909.

He died at Lovisenberg Hospital in Oslo on 22 June 1913.
