= Bjarne Undheim =

Norwegian educator and politician (1905–1988)

Bjarne Undheim (12 January 1905 – 28 May 1988) was a Norwegian educator and politician for the Centre Party.

He was born in Time Municipality. He obtained a cand.real. degree from the University of Oslo in 1930 and worked as a teacher and later principal at high schools in Rogaland.

He was elected to the Norwegian Parliament from Rogaland in 1961 and was re-elected once.

Undheim was mayor of Time Municipality during the term 1955–1959.
