= Undheim Church =

Church in Rogaland, Norway

- Undheim kyrkje
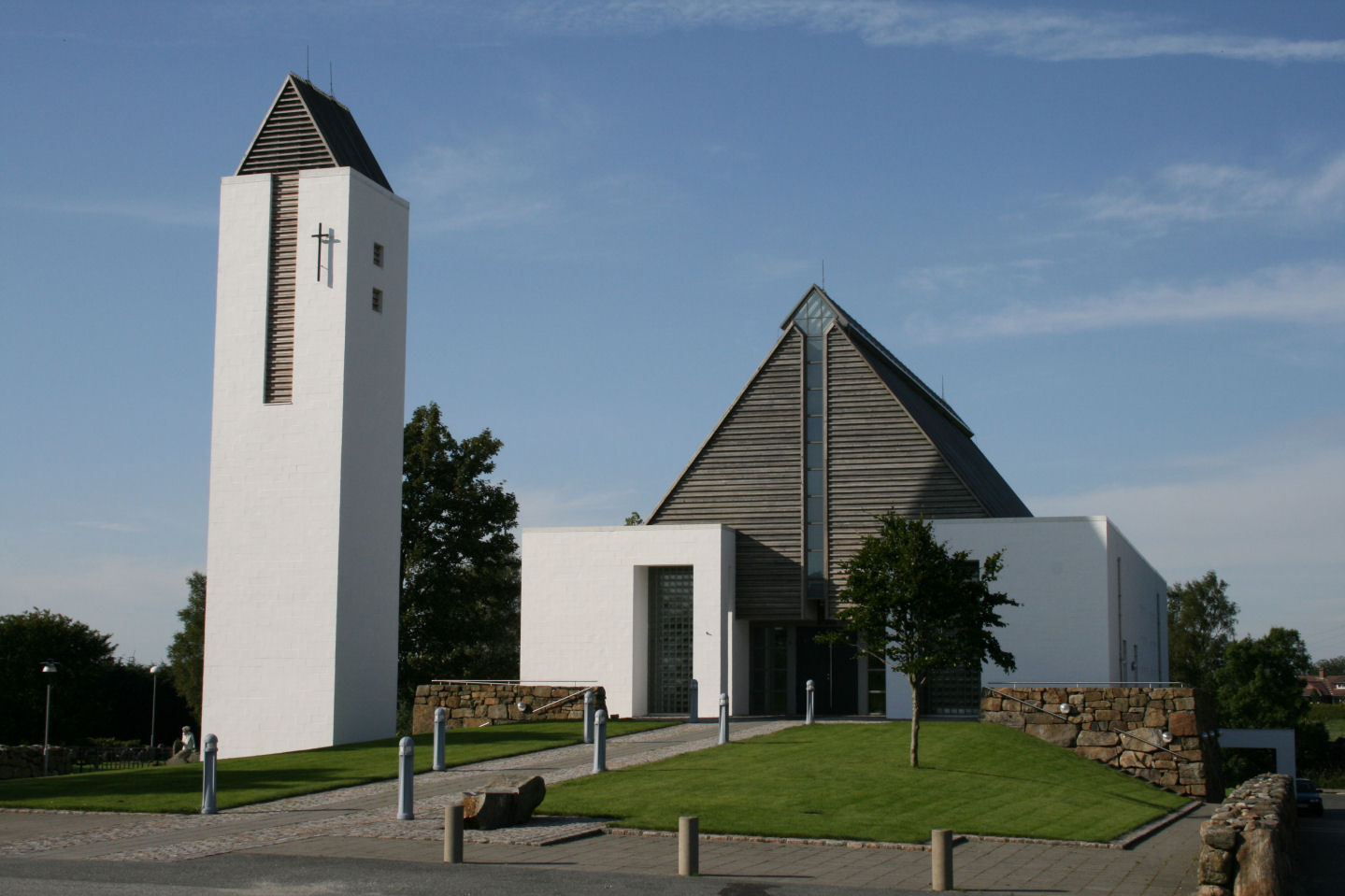
- View of the church
- Undheim Church
- 58.682898°N 05.774918°E
- Location: Time Municipality, Rogaland
- Country: Norway
- Denomination: Church of Norway
- Churchmanship: Evangelical Lutheran
- Website: www.undheimkyrkja.no

History
- Status: Parish church
- Founded: 1921
- Consecrated: 9 Dec 2001
- Events: Fire - 10 July 1998

Architecture
- Functional status: Active
- Architect: LINK arkitektur
- Architectural type: Long church
- Completed: 2001 (25 years ago)

Specifications
- Capacity: 256
- Materials: Concrete

Administration
- Diocese: Stavanger bispedømme
- Deanery: Jæren prosti
- Parish: Undheim
- Norwegian Cultural Heritage Site
- Type: Church
- Status: Not protected
- ID: 85724

Undheim Church (Norwegian: Undheim kyrkje) is a parish church of the Church of Norway in Time Municipality in Rogaland county, Norway. It is located in the village of Undheim. It is the church for the Undheim parish which is part of the Jæren prosti (deanery) in the Diocese of Stavanger. The white, concrete church was built in a long church style in 2001 using designs by the architecture firm: Link Arkitektur. The church seats about 256 people.

== History ==
The original Undheim Church was built in 1921 in a long church style by the architect Halvorsen. That church was built of wood and it had about 260 seats. That church caught fire and burned down on 10 July 1998. Its replacement was completed in 2001. The new church lies slightly to the north of where the old one was located. The new church was consecrated on 9 December 2001.

== See also ==
- List of churches in Rogaland
