= Mossige =

Village in Time Municipality, Norway

- Village
- Interactive map of Mossige
- Coordinates: 58.69298°N 5.72229°E
- Country: Norway
- Region: Western Norway
- County: Rogaland
- District: Jæren
- Municipality: Time Municipality
- Elevation: 87 m (285 ft)
- Time zone: UTC+01:00 (CET)
  - Summer (DST): UTC+02:00 (CEST)
- Post Code: 4346 Bryne

Mossige is a village in Time Municipality in Rogaland county, Norway. The village is a small farming village composed of about one dozen farms and homes. It is located about 5 kilometres (3.1 mi) southeast of the town of Bryne, the same distance northeast of the village of Nærbø, and about 3.5 kilometres (2.2 mi) west of the village of Undheim.
