= Sissel Undheim =

Norwegian professor of religion

Sissel Undheim (born 1974) is Professor of Religion at the University of Bergen. She is an expert on gender and sexuality in the late Roman period, New Age religion, and the didactics of religion.

== Education ==
Undheim received her PhD from the University of Bergen in 2011. Her doctoral thesis was entitled Sanctae virginitates: Sacred and Consecrated Virginities in Late Roman Antiquity.

== Career and research ==
Undheim published a monograph with Routledge in 2018, Borderline Virginities: Sacred and Secular Virgins in Late Antiquity. She edited a collection of translated texts on Roman religion (Romersk religion) for the Norwegian series Verdens Hellige Skrifter (Sacred Texts of the World), published in 2010. With Marie von der Lippe, she edited the volume Religion i skolen: Didaktiske perspektiver på religions- og livssynsfaget, published in 2017.

Undheim was a Fellow at the Centre for Advanced Study at the University of Oslo, 2020–21, for the project 'Books Known Only by Title: Exploring the Gendered Structures of First Millennium Imagined Libraries'.
