= Arne Garborg =

Norwegian writer (1851–1924)

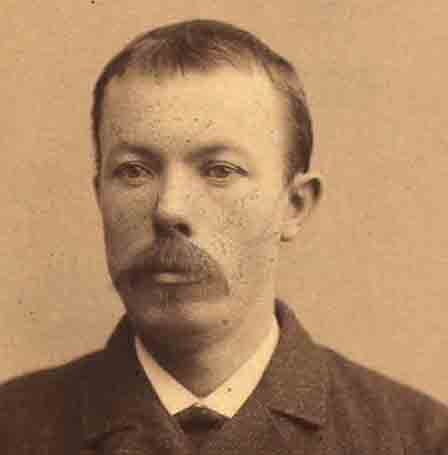
- Born: Aadne Eivindsson Garborg; January 25, 1851; Time Municipality, Norway
- Died: January 14, 1924 (aged 72)

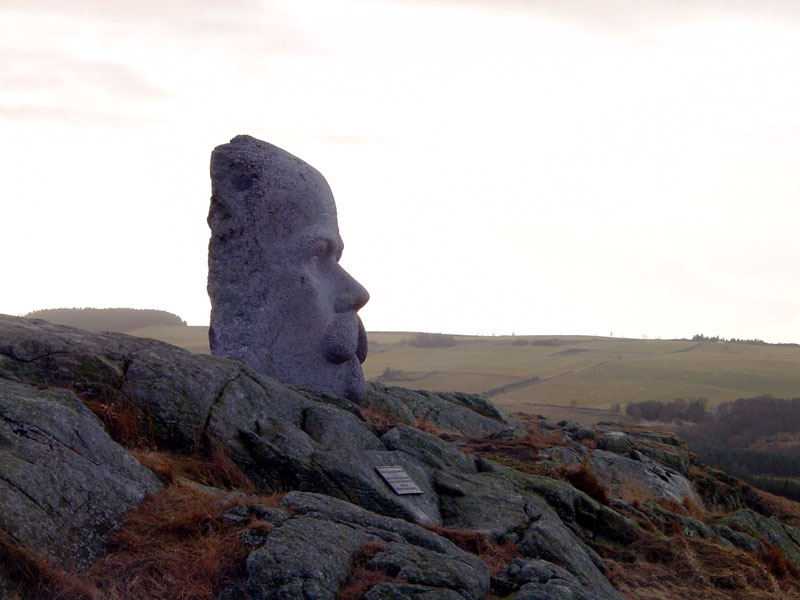
Sculpture in stone of Arne Garborg, located at his home in Knudaheio

Arne Garborg (born Aadne Eivindsson Garborg) (25 January 1851 – 14 January 1924) was a Norwegian writer.

Garborg championed the use of Landsmål (now known as Nynorsk, or New Norwegian), as a literary language; he translated the Odyssey into it. He founded the weekly Fedraheimen in 1877, in which he urged reforms in many spheres including political, social, religious, agrarian, and linguistic. He was married to Hulda Garborg.

== Life and career ==
Garborg grew up on a farm named Garborg, near the village of Undheim in Time Municipality in the Jæren district of Rogaland county. He grew up together with eight siblings. Although he was to become known as an author, it was as a newspaperman that he got his start. In 1872 he established the newspaper Tvedestrandsposten, and in 1877 the Fedraheimen, which he served as managing editor until 1892. In the 1880s he was also a journalist for the Dagbladet. In 1894 he laid the ground, together with Rasmus Steinsvik, for the paper Den 17de Mai; which changed its name to Norsk Tidend in 1935. As of 1898 Garborg was among the contributors of Ringeren, a political and cultural magazine established by Sigurd Ibsen.

His novels are profound and gripping while his essays are clear and insightful. He was never inclined to steer clear of controversy. His work tackled the issues of the day, including the relevance of religion in modern times, the conflicts between national and European identity, and the ability of the common people to actually participate in political processes and decisions.

In 2012 the Garborg Centre opened in the town of Bryne in Time Municipality. It is dedicated to the literature and philosophy of Arne and his wife, Hulda. Several of their homes are now turned into museums, like Garborgheimen, Labråten, Kolbotn and Knudaheio.

=== Bibliography ===
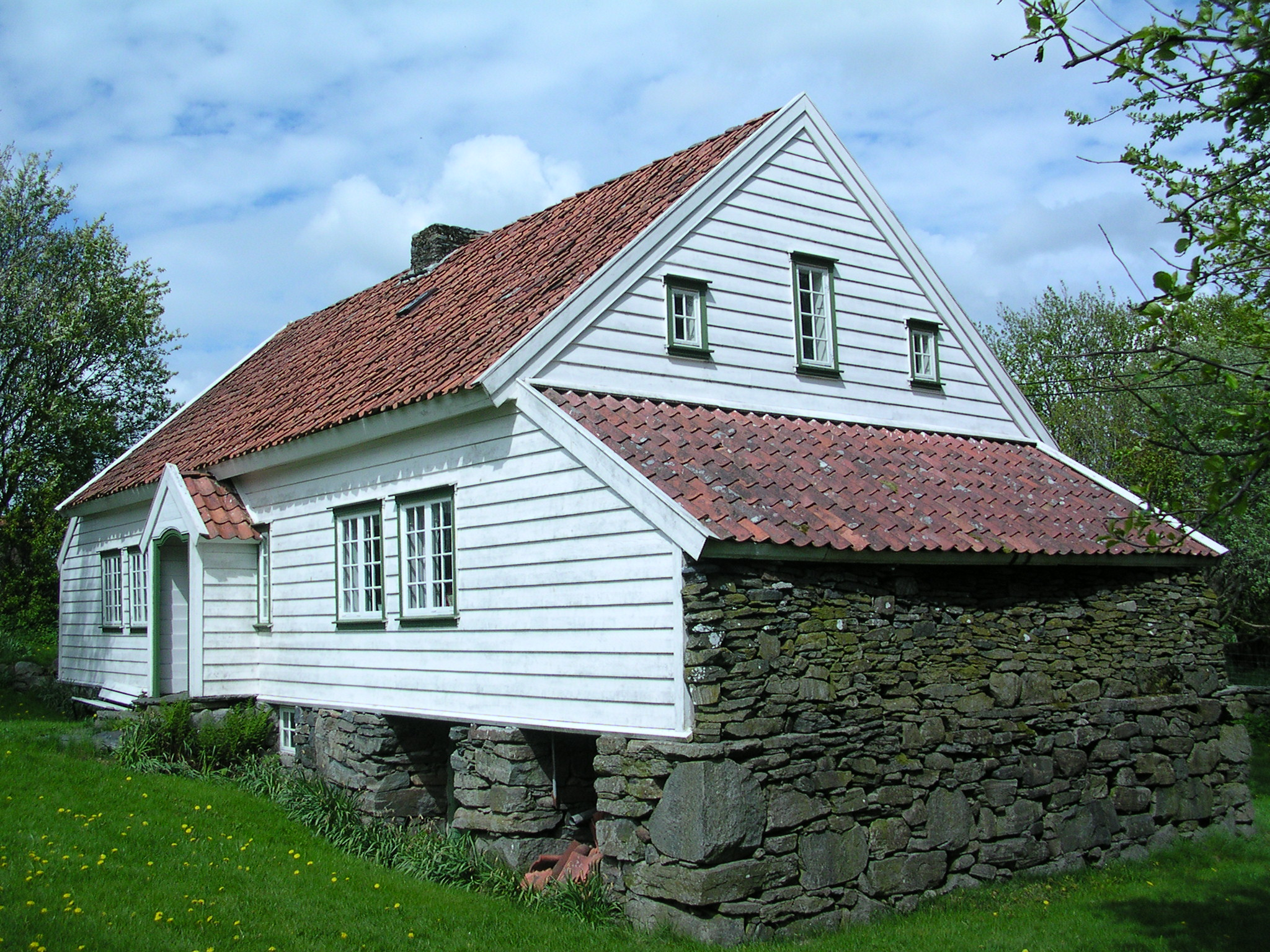
Garborg's birth home at Jæren is a museum today.

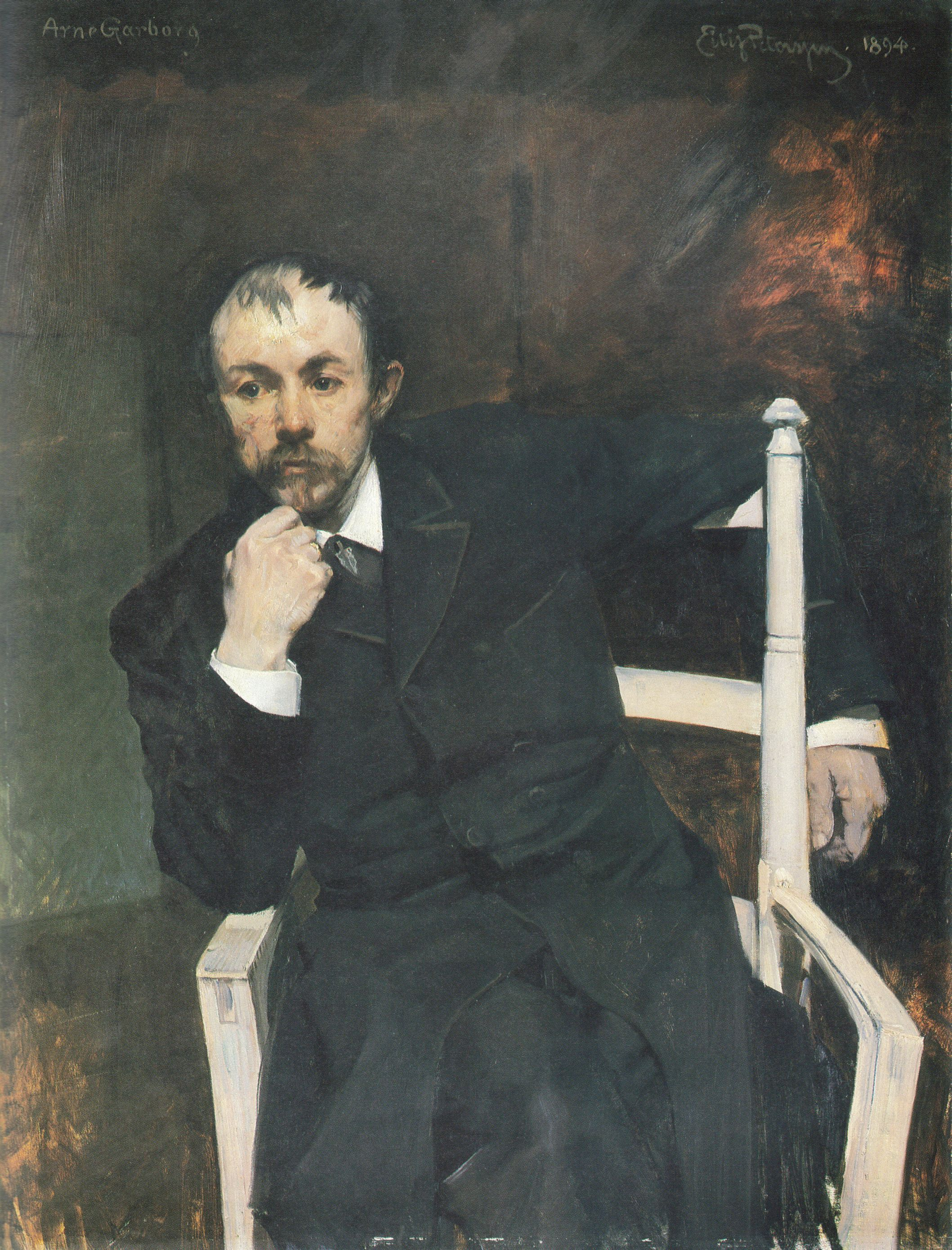
A painting of Arne Garborg by Eilif Peterssen, from 1894

- Ein Fritenkjar (1878)
- Bondestudentar (1883)
- Forteljingar og Sogur (1884)
- Mannfolk (1886)
- Uforsonlige (1888)
- Hjaa ho Mor (1890)
- Kolbotnbrev (1890) (Letters)
- Trætte Mænd (1891) (published in English as Tired Men or Weary Men)
- Fred (1892) (published in English as Peace)
- Jonas Lie. En Udviklingshistorie (1893)
- Haugtussa (1895) (Poetry)
- Læraren (1896)
- Den burtkomme Faderen (1899) (published in English in 1920 as The Lost Father, translation by Mabel Johnson Leland)
- I Helheim (1901)
- Knudahei-brev (1904) (Letters)
- Jesus Messias (1906)
- Heimkomin Son (1906)
- Dagbok 1905–1923 (1925–1927) (Diary)
- Tankar og utsyn (1950) (Essays)

=== Quotations ===
"It is said that with money you can have everything, but you cannot. You can buy food, but not appetite; medicine but not health; knowledge but not wisdom; glitter, but not beauty; fun, but not joy; acquaintances, but not friends; servants, but not faithfulness; leisure, but not peace. You can have the husk of everything for money, but not the kernel."
