= Adolph Budde =

Norwegian educator

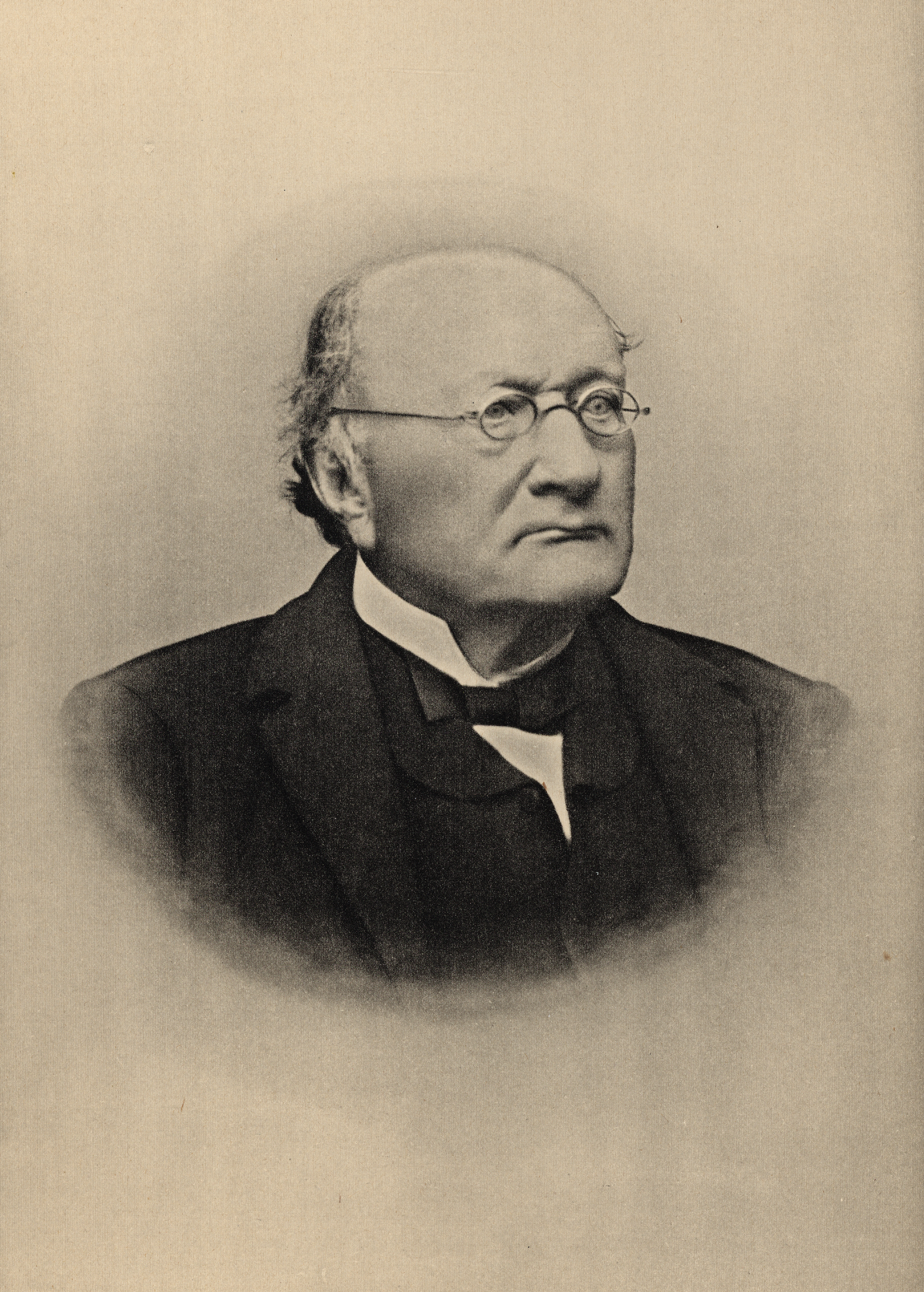
A painting of Jan Adolph Budde

Jan Adolph Budde (25 November 1811 – 3 April 1906) was a Norwegian educator, a pioneer in agriculture education in Norway. He was born in Fredriksvern. He headed the agricultural school in Austrått in Høyland Municipality from 1844 to 1876. From 1858 to 1863 he was mayor of Høyland Municipality. He was decorated Knight of the Order of St. Olav in 1877.
