= Den 17de Mai =

Norwegian newspaper

Den 17de Mai is a former Norwegian newspaper, issued in Oslo from 1894 to 1935.

== History and profile ==
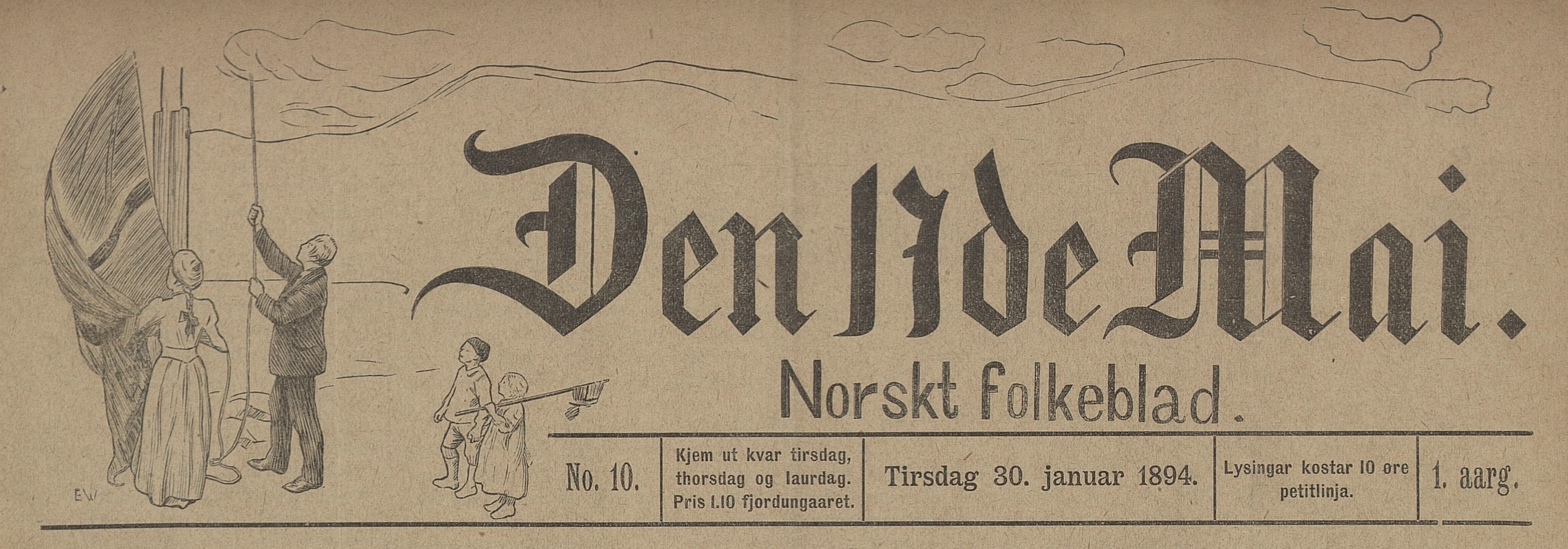
Den 17de Mai

The founder and first editor-in-chief of Den 17de Mai was Rasmus Steinsvik, who edited the newspaper until his death in 1913. Arne Garborg was co-editor the first four years. Later editors were Anders Hamre and Einar Breidsvoll. The newspaper was very significant for the Nynorsk movement. It was also the main periodical for the Nynorsk "language struggle". The paper had a liberal leaning.

In 1935 Den 17de Mai and Fedraheimen were assimilated into the new newspaper Norsk Tidend.
