= Undheim =

Village in Time Municipality, Norway

Undheim Undeim
- Village
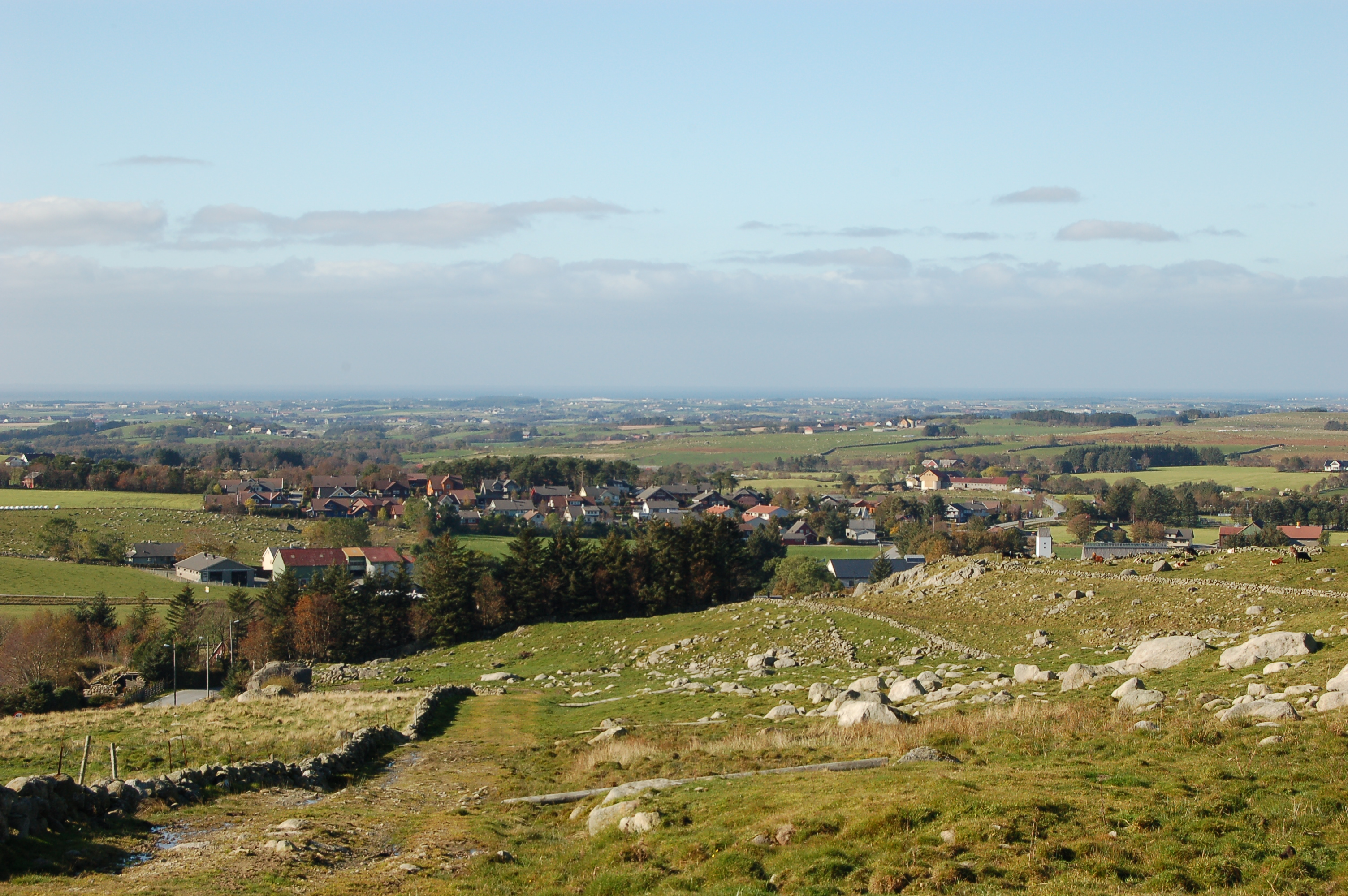
- View of the village
- Interactive map of Undheim
- Coordinates: 58.68229°N 5.77785°E
- Country: Norway
- Region: Western Norway
- County: Rogaland
- District: Jæren
- Municipality: Time Municipality

Area
  - Total: 0.41 km^{2} (0.16 sq mi)
- Elevation: 115 m (377 ft)

Population (2025)
  - Total: 635
  - Density: 1,549/km^{2} (4,010/sq mi)
- Time zone: UTC+01:00 (CET)
  - Summer (DST): UTC+02:00 (CEST)
- Post Code: 4342 Undheim

Undheim is a village in Time Municipality in Rogaland county, Norway. The village is located in Jæren, about 14 kilometres (8.7 mi) south of the village of Ålgård, about 12 kilometres (7.5 mi) southeast of the town of Bryne, and about 7 kilometres (4.3 mi) east of the village of Nærbø. The village of Mossige lies just to the northwest of Undheim.

The 0.41-square-kilometre (100-acre) village has a population (2025) of 635, giving the village a population density of 1,549 inhabitants per square kilometre (4,010/sq mi).

The main economic activity in and around Undheim is agriculture. It is mainly centered around dairy, beef, pork, and sheep, as well as cultivating fungi and potatoes. The Norwegian poet and writer Arne Garborg (1851-1924) was born on a small farm just outside Undheim. Undheim Church is located in the village.
