= Fedraheimen =

Norwegian weekly magazine

Fedraheimen was a Norwegian weekly magazine, issued from 1877 to 1891. Fedraheimen sympathized the Liberal Party.

== History and profile ==
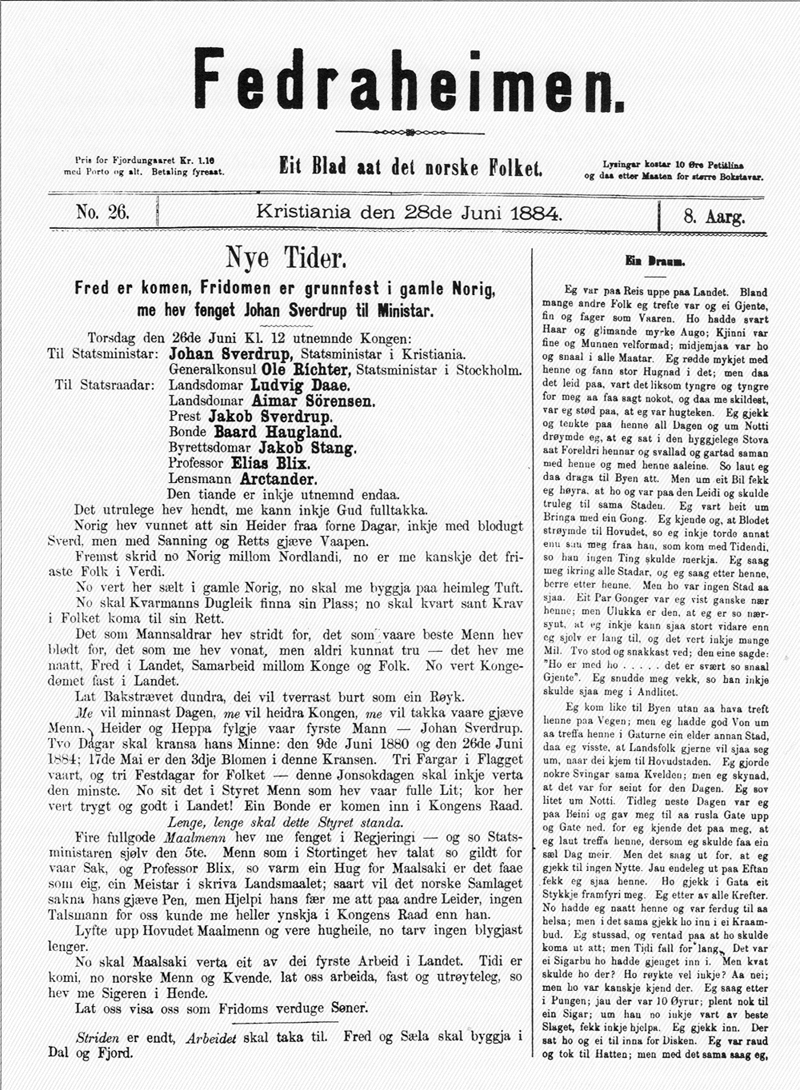
Fedraheimen

Arne Garborg founded Fedraheimen in 1877 and edited it until 1882. Ivar Mortensson-Egnund was editor until 1889, and Rasmus Steinsvik until it ceased publication in 1891. The magazine was a proponent for the Nynorsk language. Among the contributors to the magazine were Ivar Aasen, Anders Hovden, Kristofer Janson, Nils Kjær, Hans Seland and Vetle Vislie.

Parts of the magazine have been made available on-line.
