= Kverneland Group =

International agriculture company

- Type: Aksjeselskap
- Founded: 1879; 147 years ago in Kvernaland
- Founder: Ole Gabriel Kverneland
- Number of locations: Factories in 8 countries; Sales offices in 17 countries
- Key people: Arild Gjerde (Group President & CEO)
- Brands: Kverneland; Vicon; Kubota; iM FARMING
- Number of employees: 2,550 (2021)
- Parent: Kubota Corporation
- Website: ien.kvernelandgroup.com

Kverneland Group is an international company developing, producing and distributing agricultural implements, electronics and digital services to the farming community. The company provides Agricultural Implement Technology through the equipment manufacturing offering. Kverneland Group offers a range of soil and seeding equipment, forage and bale equipment, spreading, spraying, electronics, and digital farm services for agricultural tractors and implements.

== Company history ==
Kverneland Group was established by Ole Gabriel Kverneland in 1879. It became a limited company in 1894 and by the 1920s it had become Norway's largest supplier of agricultural products, particularly in ploughs. Kverneland remained a family-owned business until the company was listed on the Oslo Stock Exchange in 1983. Since the mid 1990s Kverneland Group has expanded through acquisitions of other manufacturers of agricultural implements.

Brands acquired by the Kverneland Group include Underhaug bale wrappers, Taarup Maskinfabrik disc mowers and hay tools, Maletti rotary harrows, Maschinenfabrik Accord seeding machines, Dutch Greenland Group fertiliser spreaders and grass product machinery, and RAU field sprayers. In 2008, the Taarup, Accord and RAU brand names were discontinued and replaced by the Kverneland name across the product range.

In 2010, Kverneland Group formed a long-term joint venture with Gallignani s.p.a. with a new range of round balers (fixed and variable chamber), wrappers and a new range of drum mowers. In 2011, Kverneland Group opened a new assembly plant in Daqing, China. In 2012, Kubota Corporation acquired Kverneland Group. Kverneland Group was delisted from the Oslo Stock Exchange in May 2012.

The company headquarters are located in Klepp Municipality, in the village of Kvernaland. Kverneland Group employs approximately 2,550 people worldwide, most of them in Europe. Kverneland Group owns the implement brands Kubota, Kverneland and Vicon.

Kverneland Group’s factories are located in Norway, Denmark, Germany, France, The Netherlands, Italy, Russia and China. The Group has its own sales companies in 17 countries and exports to another 60 countries.
