= List of villages in Rogaland =

This is a list of villages in Rogaland, a county of Norway. For other counties see the lists of villages in Norway.

The list excludes cities located in Rogaland.

Place	Coordinates	Postal code	Municipality
Aksdal	59°25′26″N 05°26′44″E	5570	Tysvær
Amdal	59°39′24″N 06°18′34″E	5570	Sauda
Askje	59°03′49″N 05°41′13″E	4156	Stavanger
Austre Åmøy	59°02′17″N 05°45′33″E	4154	Stavanger
Avaldsnes	59°21′16″N 05°16′37″E	4262	Karmøy
Barstad	58°23′36″N 06°16′26″E	4380	Sokndal
Bergjord	59°27′52″N 06°26′12″E	4230	Suldal
Bersagel	58°55′52″N 05°58′03″E	4308	Sandnes
Bjoa	59°39′53″N 05°38′39″E	5584	Vindafjord
Bjøreimsbygda	59°04′42″N 06°01′50″E	4120	Strand
Bokn	59°09′44″N 05°56′30″E	4169	Stavanger
Bore	58°47′41″N 05°35′55″E	4352	Klepp
Botne	58°59′01″N 06°05′24″E	4100	Strand
Breidborg	59°43′19″N 06°33′34″E	4200	Sauda
Brimse	59°04′56″N 05°48′36″E	4153	Stavanger
Bru	59°02′16″N 05°39′49″E	4158	Stavanger
Brusand	58°32′26″N 05°44′40″E	4363	Hå
Bu	58°18′31″N 06°19′59″E	4380	Sokndal
Byre	59°09′43″N 05°58′15″E	4168	Stavanger
Byrkjedal	58°46′53″N 06°19′22″E	4335	Gjesdal
Dale	58°53′56″N 05°46′42″E	4329	Sandnes
Dirdal	58°50′02″N 06°10′51″E	4335	Gjesdal
Dueland	59°25′52″N 05°35′49″E	5567	Tysvær
Eide	58°28′29″N 06°21′38″E	4463	Lund
Eidssund	59°14′06″N 05°56′18″E	4187	Stavanger
Eik	58°31′31″N 06°29′46″E	4462	Lund
Eike	59°23′34″N 05°22′14″E	5542	Karmøy
Eikelandsdalen	58°37′21″N 06°27′42″E	4376	Eigersund
Eltarvåg	58°56′51″N 05°53′41″E	4308	Sandnes
Erfjord	59°20′37″N 06°12′54″E	4233	Suldal
Ferkingstad	59°13′03″N 05°11′30″E	4274	Karmøy
Feøy	59°22′48″N 05°09′07″E	5548	Karmøy
Figgjo	58°47′11″N 05°48′55″E	4332	Sandnes
Finnvik	59°27′01″N 06°01′52″E	4235	Suldal
Fiskå	59°06′53″N 06°00′08″E	4122	Strand
Fister	59°10′29″N 06°03′17″E	4139	Hjelmeland
Fløyrli	59°00′49″N 06°25′28″E	4128	Sandnes
Fogn	59°08′20″N 05°53′59″E	4164	Stavanger
Foldøy	59°20′12″N 05°58′20″E	4198	Suldal
Forsand	58°54′11″N 06°06′17″E	4110	Sandnes
Foss-Eikeland	58°48′05″N 05°43′47″E	4323	Sandnes
Frafjord	58°50′36″N 06°18′19″E	4335	Gjesdal
Føresvik	59°13′51″N 05°26′21″E	5561	Bokn
Førland	59°23′53″N 05°29′17″E	5570	Tysvær
Førre	59°25′27″N 05°23′04″E	5563	Tysvær
Gjesdal	58°46′07″N 05°57′17″E	4330	Gjesdal
Gilja	58°48′25″N 06°15′32″E	4335	Gjesdal
Goa	58°59′17″N 05°37′58″E	4070	Randaberg
Grinde	59°25′49″N 05°27′54″E	5570	Tysvær
Grødeim	59°00′24″N 05°39′00″E	4070	Randaberg
Hauge i Dalane	58°20′36″N 06°16′52″E	4380	Sokndal
Haugsgjerd	59°39′27″N 05°42′32″E	5584	Vindafjord
Hebnes	59°21′29″N 05°57′53″E	4235	Suldal
Hegelstad	58°39′35″N 06°10′14″E	4389	Bjerkreim
Heia	59°05′02″N 06°01′28″E	4120	Strand
Helgøysund	59°13′24″N 05°50′22″E	4174	Stavanger
Hellandsbygda	59°41′28″N 06°30′39″E	4200	Sauda
Helleland	58°31′25″N 06°07′01″E	4376	Eigersund
Hellemork	58°22′45″N 06°35′28″E	4460	Lund
Hellvik	58°28′14″N 05°52′41″E	4376	Eigersund
Hervik	59°19′26″N 05°35′36″E	5566	Tysvær
Hesby	59°10′34″N 05°48′49″E	4160	Stavanger
Heskestad	58°29′52″N 06°21′33″E	4463	Lund
Hestnes	58°25′19″N 06°00′40″E	4370	Eigersund
Hindaråvåg	59°20′52″N 05°48′47″E	5560	Tysvær
Hindaråker	59°21′13″N 05°15′13″E	4262	Karmøy
Hjelmelandsvågen	59°14′12″N 06°10′44″E	4130	Hjelmeland
Hognestad	58°42′13″N 05°40′05″E	4346	Time
Hommersåk	58°55′32″N 05°51′03″E	4311	Sandnes
Hovland	58°32′36″N 06°09′22″E	4370	Eigersund
Hovsherad	58°31′31″N 06°29′47″E	4462	Lund
Hundvåg	59°00′06″N 05°43′54″E	4085	Stavanger
Hæen	58°33′45″N 05°44′21″E	4362	Hå
Høle	58°53′44″N 06°00′33″E	4308	Sandnes
Hålandsmarka	58°51′04″N 05°34′34″E	4053	Sola
Hålandsosen	59°20′53″N 06°14′22″E	4233	Suldal
Håvik	59°19′25″N 05°17′46″E	4265	Karmøy
Idse	58°58′53″N 05°56′30″E	4102	Strand
Ims	58°54′13″N 05°57′48″E	4308	Sandnes
Imslandsjøen	59°28′37″N 05°59′17″E	5583	Vindafjord
Innbjoa	59°39′42″N 05°39′06″E	5584	Vindafjord
Isvik	59°30′03″N 05°34′42″E	5574	Vindafjord
Jelsa	59°20′14″N 06°01′35″E	4234	Suldal
Judaberg	59°10′19″N 05°52′34″E	4160	Stavanger
Jøsenfjorden	59°19′44″N 06°26′43″E	4134	Hjelmeland
Jøssang	58°59′50″N 06°04′46″E	4102	Strand
Kjølevik	59°06′29″N 05°57′13″E	4120	Strand
Klepp stasjon	58°46′22″N 05°40′38″E	4353	Klepp
Kleppe	58°46′27″N 05°37′45″E	4352	Klepp
Kolabygda	58°56′33″N 06°01′14″E	4110	Strand
Kolnes i Karmøy	59°23′10″N 05°22′20″E	5541	Karmøy
Kolnes i Sola	58°54′03″N 05°35′13″E	4055	Sola
Kolstø	59°19′38″N 05°17′23″E	4265	Karmøy
Kreppene	59°22′59″N 05°38′35″E	5560	Tysvær
Krossberg	58°57′52″N 05°38′40″E	4047	Stavanger
Kvalavåg	59°19′23″N 05°12′30″E	4264	Karmøy
Kvernaland	58°46′14″N 05°43′34″E	4355	Klepp; Time
Kvilldal	59°30′42″N 06°38′09″E	4237	Suldal
Laksesvela	58°36′35″N 06°00′18″E	4387	Bjerkreim
Li	58°19′00″N 06°20′44″E	4380	Sokndal
Lindanger	59°24′18″N 05°38′36″E	5567	Tysvær
Lyefjell	58°44′05″N 05°43′53″E	4347	Time
Lysebotn	59°03′19″N 06°38′54″E	4127	Sandnes
Lædre	58°22′49″N 06°04′09″E	4372	Eigersund
Løland	59°33′01″N 06°20′13″E	4209	Suldal
Marvik	59°24′39″N 06°04′55″E	4235	Suldal
Mjølhus	58°28′11″N 06°02′15″E	4370	Eigersund
Moi	58°27′24″N 06°33′06″E	4460	Lund
Mong	58°22′10″N 06°06′02″E	4372	Eigersund
Mossige	58°41′34″N 05°43′14″E	4346	Time
Mydland	58°23′48″N 06°25′39″E	4380	Sokndal
Myklebust	58°27′39″N 05°55′32″E	4374	Eigersund
Nedstrand	59°20′44″N 05°51′27″E	5560	Tysvær
Nesflaten	59°38′47″N 06°47′59″E	4244	Suldal
Nesvåg	58°20′16″N 06°11′53″E	4380	Sokndal
Nip	59°41′58″N 06°21′19″E	4200	Sauda
Nord-Hidle	59°14′11″N 05°53′19″E	4173	Stavanger
Nodvig	59°00′03″N 06°04′23″E	4100	Strand
Norheim	59°22′40″N 05°18′45″E	5542	Karmøy
Nærbø	58°39′55″N 05°38′16″E	4365	Hå
Oanes	58°54′17″N 06°04′24″E	4110	Strand
Obrestad	58°39′18″N 05°34′04″E	4365	Hå
Ogna	58°30′55″N 05°48′34″E	4364	Hå
Ognedal	58°35′54″N 06°00′15″E	4387	Bjerkreim
Oltedal	58°49′42″N 06°02′12″E	4333	Gjesdal
Oppstad	58°39′05″N 05°41′13″E	4365	Hå
Orre	58°43′43″N 05°31′43″E	4343	Klepp
Osnes	59°24′05″N 05°14′40″E	4260	Karmøy
Pollestad	58°43′04″N 05°34′06″E	4343	Klepp
Randaberg	58°59′58″N 05°37′07″E	4070	Randaberg
Rekefjord	58°20′22″N 06°15′38″E	4380	Sokndal
Rekeland	58°21′58″N 06°15′48″E	4380	Sokndal
Reppsbygda	59°25′10″N 06°01′49″E	4235	Suldal
Roalkvam	59°39′14″N 06°52′02″E	4244	Suldal
Røvær	59°26′16″N 05°05′24″E	5549	Haugesund
Røyksund	59°20′01″N 05°21′36″E	5546	Karmøy
Røyland	58°21′55″N 06°35′10″E	4460	Lund
Røysland	58°34′52″N 06°04′37″E	4387	Bjerkreim
Røyneberg/Sørnes	58°54′35″N 05°40′03″E	4052	Sola
Ræge (Rege)	58°51′34″N 05°36′56″E	4053	Sola
Salte	58°42′06″N 05°35′04″E	4343	Klepp
Sand i Ryfylke	59°29′04″N 06°15′03″E	4230	Suldal
Sandbekk	58°21′49″N 06°20′02″E	4380	Sokndal
Sande	58°53′30″N 05°39′26″E	4051	Sola
Sandeid	59°32′48″N 05°51′28″E	5585	Vindafjord
Sandve	59°10′30″N 05°11′45″E	4272	Karmøy
Saudasjøen	59°38′17″N 06°18′11″E	4208	Sauda
Segleim	58°26′43″N 05°53′36″E	4374	Eigersund
Sirevåg	58°30′13″N 05°48′07″E	4364	Hå
Sjernarøy	59°15′13″N 05°48′54″E	4170	Stavanger
Skartveit	59°12′03″N 05°57′04″E	4182	Stavanger
Skiftun	59°16′41″N 06°08′27″E	4146	Hjelmeland
Skjæveland	58°39′19″N 06°05′11″E	4389	Bjerkreim
Skjold	59°30′09″N 05°35′12″E	5574	Vindafjord
Skjoldastraumen	59°25′55″N 05°36′49″E	5567	Tysvær
Skokland	59°27′12″N 05°17′54″E	5514	Haugesund
Skre	59°24′40″N 05°22′03″E	5541	Karmøy
Skåland	58°25′34″N 06°33′01″E	4460	Lund
Skåra	58°26′26″N 06°01′44″E	4370	Eigersund
Snøda	58°55′34″N 05°36′31″E	4056	Sola
Sogndalsstranda	58°19′22″N 06°17′04″E	4380	Sokndal
Solakrossen	58°53′18″N 05°38′57″E	4050	Sola
Stenebyen	58°50′29″N 05°35′51″E	4054	Sola
Stokka	59°15′32″N 05°19′21″E	4250	Karmøy
Stol	59°13′28″N 05°11′51″E	4274	Karmøy
Stronda	58°52′42″N 05°46′15″E	4308	Sandnes
Suldalsosen	59°29′34″N 06°31′09″E	4237	Suldal
Susort	59°16′44″N 05°28′42″E	5565	Tysvær
Svandal	59°37′50″N 06°15′31″E	4208	Sauda
Sviland	58°49′20″N 05°49′19″E	4308	Sandnes
Svånes	58°23′28″N 06°01′53″E	4372	Eigersund
Syre	59°09′02″N 05°12′46″E	4280	Karmøy
Sævelandsvik	59°16′17″N 05°11′38″E	4275	Karmøy
Sør-Hidle	59°02′49″N 05°49′39″E	4123	Strand
Sørbø	59°07′40″N 05°38′31″E	4150	Stavanger
Talgje	59°13′26″N 05°49′45″E	4163	Stavanger
Tau	59°03′53″N 05°55′20″E	4120	Strand
Tengesdal	58°31′42″N 06°01′30″E	4387	Bjerkreim
Tengs	58°28′48″N 05°59′26″E	4370	Eigersund
Tjelta	58°50′29″N 05°35′51″E	4054	Sola
Tjora	58°54′52″N 05°35′59″E	4055	Sola
Torvastad	59°22′49″N 05°14′13″E	4260	Karmøy
Tysværvåg	59°19′53″N 05°29′29″E	5565	Tysvær
Ualand	58°30′46″N 06°21′52″E	4463	Lund
Undheim	58°40′56″N 05°46′40″E	4342	Time
Utbjoa	59°40′39″N 05°36′23″E	5584	Vindafjord
Utsira	59°18′33″N 04°52′58″E	5547	Utsira
Vanvik	59°32′37″N 06°21′32″E	4209	Suldal
Varhaug	58°36′58″N 05°39′06″E	4360	Hå
Vassbø	58°40′16″N 06°22′46″E	4389	Bjerkreim
Vassøy	58°59′54″N 05°47′06″E	4076	Stavanger
Vatnamot	58°29′18″N 05°50′22″E	4364	Hå
Vatne i Sandnes	58°51′25″N 05°47′12″E	4308	Sandnes
Vatne i Vindafjord	59°29′36″N 05°43′38″E	5578	Vindafjord
Veavågen	59°17′41″N 05°13′07″E	4276	Karmøy
Vedle	59°32′50″N 05°42′11″E	5576	Vindafjord
Verdalen	58°47′02″N 05°36′15″E	4352	Klepp
Vestrå	59°29′07″N 05°31′53″E	5574	Vindafjord
Vestre Åmøy	59°02′36″N 05°41′28″E	4152	Stavanger
Vigre	58°39′35″N 05°35′55″E	4365	Hå
Vigrestad	58°34′15″N 05°40′54″E	4362	Hå
Vikebygd	59°36′03″N 05°35′37″E	5568	Vindafjord
Vikedal	59°29′49″N 05°54′35″E	5583	Vindafjord
Vikesdal	58°38′35″N 06°06′46″E	4389	Bjerkreim
Vikeså	58°38′00″N 06°04′58″E	4389	Bjerkreim
Vikevåg	59°05′53″N 05°41′53″E	4150	Stavanger
Vinjar	59°29′24″N 06°29′35″E	4237	Suldal
Visnes	59°21′20″N 05°13′27″E	4262	Karmøy
Voll	58°48′21″N 05°36′18″E	4354	Klepp
Vormedal	59°21′18″N 05°19′08″E	5545	Karmøy
Våge	59°20′32″N 05°16′31″E	4262	Karmøy
Vårå	59°18′35″N 05°17′25″E	4265	Karmøy
Yrke	59°23′52″N 05°40′06″E	5567	Tysvær
Ystabø (Ystabøhamn)	59°03′44″N 05°24′08″E	4180	Kvitsøy
Ytraland	59°18′18″N 05°13′34″E	4250	Karmøy
Ytre Bø	59°00′09″N 05°34′36″E	4070	Randaberg
Øksnevad	58°47′51″N 05°39′24″E	4353	Klepp
Ølbør	58°51′47″N 05°34′09″E	4053	Sola
Ølensjøen	59°36′13″N 05°48′27″E	5580	Vindafjord
Ølensvåg (Ølsvågen)	59°35′47″N 05°44′47″E	5582	Vindafjord
Østhusvik	59°05′30″N 05°46′37″E	4150	Stavanger
Øvre Espedal	58°54′55″N 06°16′20″E	4110	Sandnes
Øvre Maudal	58°45′47″N 06°20′56″E	4335	Gjesdal
Øvrebygd	58°41′13″N 06°09′15″E	4389	Bjerkreim
Øye	59°13′44″N 06°05′12″E	4130	Hjelmeland
Åbødalen	59°39′40″N 06°21′34″E	4200	Sauda
Ålgård	58°45′51″N 05°51′09″E	4330	Gjesdal
Åmdal	58°30′54″N 06°21′05″E	4463	Lund
Åmot	58°20′47″N 06°19′08″E	4380	Sokndal
Åna-Sira	58°17′32″N 06°26′24″E	4420	Sokndal
Årdal i Ryfylke	59°09′10″N 06°09′40″E	4137	Hjelmeland
