= Randaberg =

Randaberg may refer to:

== Places ==
- Randaberg Municipality, a municipality in Rogaland county, Norway
- Randaberg (village), a village within Randaberg Municipality in Rogaland county, Norway
- Randaberg Church, a church in Randaberg Municipality in Rogaland county, Norway

== Sports ==
- Randaberg Stadion, a stadium in Randaberg Municipality in Rogaland county, Norway
- Randaberg IL, a sports club based in Randaberg Municipality in Rogaland county, Norway
