= Orre =

Orre may refer to:

== People ==
- Eystein Orre (died 1066), a Norwegian noble who was killed at the Battle of Stamford Bridge
- Magne Orre (born 1950), a Norwegian cyclist

== Places ==
- Orre, Rogaland, a village in Klepp municipality, Rogaland county, Norway
  - Old Orre Church, a church in the village of Orre in Klepp municipality, Rogaland county, Norway
  - Orre Church, a church in the village of Pollestad in Klepp municipality, Rogaland county, Norway

== Other ==
- Orre region, the setting of Pokémon Colosseum and its sequel, Pokémon XD: Gale of Darkness
