= Aiko =

- Gender: Female (Japanese); Male (German)
- Language: Japanese; German

Other names
- Variant forms: あいこ, アイコ

Aiko (あいこ, アイコ) is a feminine Japanese given name.

Aikō (愛甲) is a Japanese surname, also romanized as Aikoh or Aiko.

Aiko or Ayko is also a traditional masculine given name in northern Germany and parts of Scandinavia. In Germany, it can also be spelled Aik or Aike and is considered one of the old "gentry names", as a variation of the name Eike. It is derived from the Old German word Ekke/Ekka, which translates to "blade".

== Possible meanings ==
The meaning varies depending on the kanji used to write it. Several written forms include:

- 愛子 — Love, child, child of love
- 愛幸 — Love fortune.
- 葵子 — Hollyhock and child; the same kanji can be used to write Riko and Kiko as well as the more similar Aoko, Aoiko, and Ako.
- 藍子 — Indigo, child.

== Notable people with this name ==
- Aiko (Czech singer), a Czech singer-songwriter
- Aiko (Japanese singer) (愛子), a Japanese singer-songwriter
- Aiko, Princess Toshi (愛子内親王), a Japanese princess
- Aiko Anzai (安西 愛子; 1917–2017), Japanese vocalist and politician
- Aiko Asano (浅野 愛子; born 1958), Japanese actress and singer
- Aiko Climaco (born 1989), Filipino actress, model and comedian
- Aiko Doden (道傳 愛子; born 1965), Japanese news presenter
- Aiko Fujitani (1902–1965), Japanese religious leader in Hawaii
- Aiko Fukumorida (福盛田 藍子), Japanese manga artist
- Aiko Gibo (宜保 愛子; 1932–2003), Japanese occultist
- Aiko Gommers (born 2004), Belgian BMX racer
- Aiko Hayafune (早船 愛子; born 1980), Japanese team handball player
- Aiko Hayashi (林 愛子; born 1993), Japanese synchronized swimmer
- Aiko Herzig-Yoshinaga (1924–2018), Japanese American political activist
- Aiko Horiuchi (堀内 愛子; born 1984), Japanese painter, writer, and actress
- Aiko Iguchi (井口 愛子; 1910–1984), Japanese pianist
- Aiko Ikuta (幾田 愛子; born 1985), Japanese singer
- Aiko Itō (いとう あいこ; born 1980), Japanese former actress
- Aiko Kaitou (皆藤 愛子; born 1984), Japanese newscaster, tarento and announcer
- Aiko Kayō (かよう 愛子; born 1985), Japanese singer and actress
- Aiko Kitahara (北原 愛子; born 1982), Japanese former pop singer and songwriter
- Aiko Kitahara (novelist) (北原 亞以子; 1938–2013), Japanese novelist
- Aiko Melendez (born 1975), Filipino actress and politician
- Aiko Mimasu (三益 愛子; 1910-1982), Japanese actress
- Aiko Miyake (三宅 愛子; born 1978), Japanese former freestyle swimmer
- Aiko Miyamura (宮村 愛子; born 1971), Japanese badminton player
- Aiko Miyanaga (宮永 愛子; born 1974), Japanese contemporary artist
- Aiko Miyawaki (宮脇 愛子; 1929–2014), Japanese sculptor
- Aiko Moriyama (森山 愛子; born 1985), Japanese singer
- Aiko Morishita (森下 愛子; born 1958), Japanese actress
- Aiko Nakagawa (born 1975), known as Lady Aiko, a Japanese street artist
- Aiko Nakamura (中村 藍子; born 1983), Japanese professional tennis player
- Aiko Okazaki (岡崎 愛子; born 1986), Japanese Paralympic archer
- Aiko Okumura (奥村 愛子; born 1980), Japanese singer
- Aiko Onozawa (小野沢 愛子; born 1945), Japanese former volleyball player
- Aiko Otake (大竹 愛子; born 1994), Japanese gravure idol
- Aiko Saito (齋藤 愛子; born 1958), Japanese sailor
- Aiko Sarwosri (born 1989), Indonesian model, chef, radio broadcaster and celebrity
- Aiko Satō (actress) (佐藤 藍子; born 1977), Japanese actress
- Aiko Satō (judoka) (佐藤 愛子; born 1983), Japanese judoka
- Aiko Satō (writer) (佐藤 愛子; 1923–2026), Japanese writer
- Aiko Shimajiri (島尻 安伊子; born 1965), Japanese politician
- Aiko Sugihara (杉原 愛子; born 1999), Japanese female artistic gymnast
- Aiko Suzuki (1937–2005), Canadian textile and visual artist
- Aiko Takahama (高浜 愛子; born 1984), Japanese women's professional shogi player
- Aiko Uemura (上村 愛子; born 1979), Japanese freestyle skier
- Grace Aiko Nakamura (1927–2017), Japanese American educator
- Merle Aiko Okawara (大河原 愛子; born 1941), Japanese American businesswoman
- Jhené Aiko (born 1988), American singer/songwriter
- Makan Aïko (born 2001), French professional footballer

== Fictional characters ==
- Aiko, an anime-style 3D figure created by DAZ3D
- Aiko Senoo (妹尾 あいこ) (Mirabelle Haywood), a character in the shōjo anime Ojamajo Doremi
- Aiko Miyazaki (Honey Lemon), a Marvel Comics superhero associated with Big Hero 6, a Japanese team
- Aiko Tanaka (田中 愛子), a character and the primary love interest of the slice of life manga Oyasumi Punpun
- Aiko Takada, a character from the fantasy manga Elfen Lied
- Aiko Yumi, a Japanese college professor and a dateable character in the dating simulation videogame HuniePop

== See also ==
- A.I.C.O. -Incarnation-, a 2018 Japanese original net animation produced by studio Bones
