= Eicke (surname) =

Eicke is a German surname. Notable people with the surname include:

- Edna Eicke (1919–1979), American magazine illustrator
- Hans Eicke (1884–1947), German Olympic athlete
- Roberta Eike, American oceanographer and marine geologist
- Theodor Eicke (1892–1943), German Nazi SS general and Holocaust perpetrator
- Ulrich Eicke (born 1952), German canoer
- Wels Eicke (1893–1980), Australian footballer

== See also ==
- Kampfgruppe Eicke, name of the 3rd SS Division Totenkopf (prior to achieving division status), named after Theodor Eicke
