= Skartveit =

Skartveit is a surname. Notable people with the surname include:

- Andreas Skartveit (born 1937), Norwegian journalist, magazine editor, and publisher
- Gro Skartveit (born 1965), Norwegian politician
- Hanne Skartveit (born 1966), Norwegian journalist and political editor, daughter of Andreas
