= Viste =

Viste may refer to:

- Viste Hundred or Viste härad, a hundred (administrative division) of Västergötland in Sweden
- Viste, the location of Vistehola or Svarthola, a cave with rich finds from Stone Age, located in the municipality of Randaberg, Norway
- VISTE, Volunteers in Service to the Elderly, a nonprofit organization based in Lakeland, Florida, with the goal of enabling frail elderly persons to continue living independently and safely in their own home
