= Grødem Church =

Church in Rogaland, Norway

- Grødem kirke
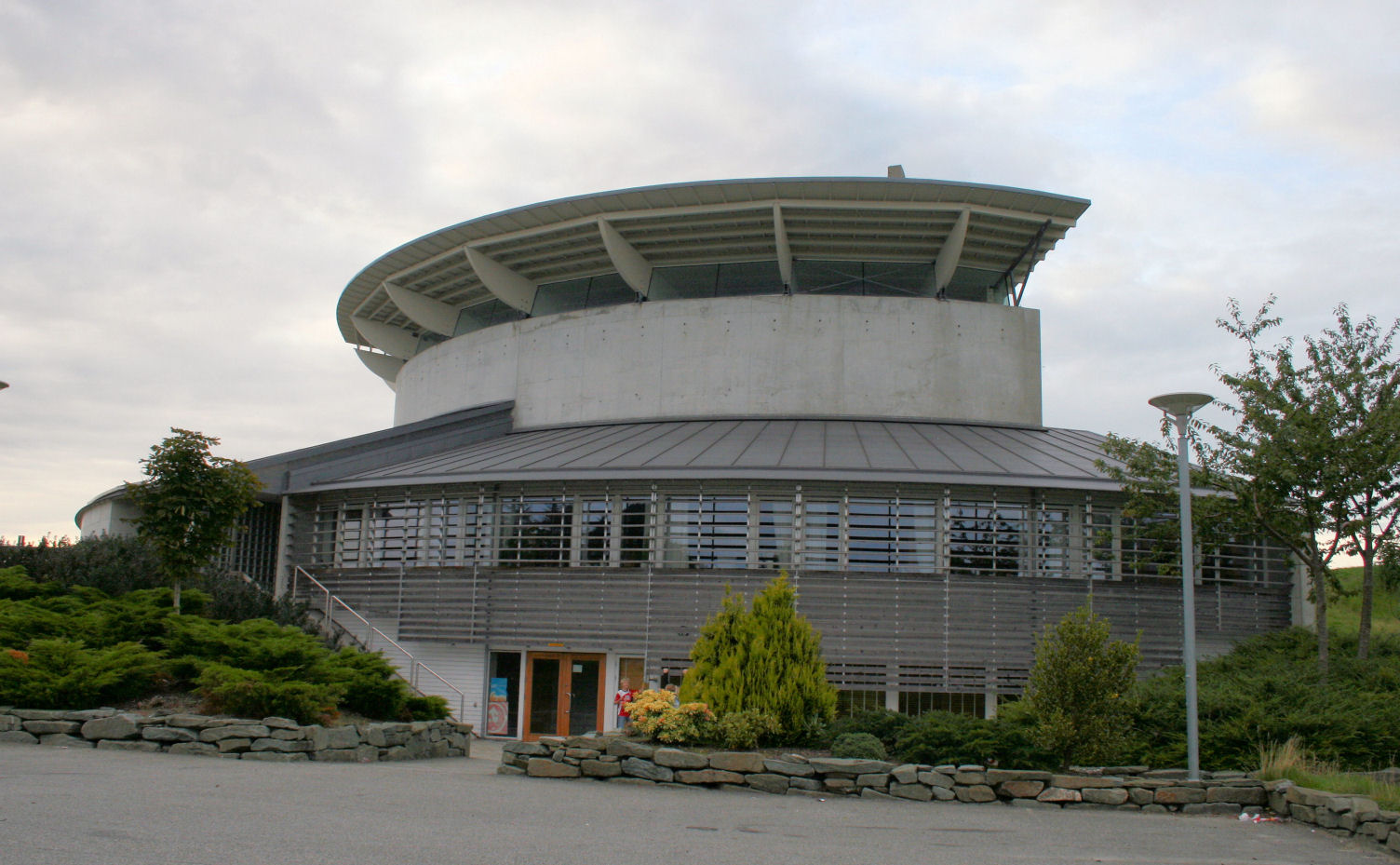
- View of the church
- Grødem Church
- 59.00892°N 5.65009°E
- Location: Randaberg Municipality, Rogaland
- Country: Norway
- Denomination: Church of Norway
- Churchmanship: Evangelical Lutheran

History
- Status: Parish church
- Founded: 2000
- Consecrated: 28 May 2000

Architecture
- Functional status: Active
- Architect: Ove Morten Berge
- Architectural type: Semi-circular
- Completed: 2000

Specifications
- Capacity: 450
- Materials: Concrete and brick

Administration
- Diocese: Stavanger bispedømme
- Deanery: Tungenes prosti
- Parish: Randaberg

Grødem Church (Norwegian: Grødem kirke) is a parish church of the Church of Norway in Randaberg Municipality in Rogaland county, Norway. It is located in the village of Grødem. It is one of the two churches for the Randaberg parish which is part of the Tungenes prosti (deanery) in the Diocese of Stavanger. The gray concrete church was built in a semi-circular design in 2000 using designs by the architect Ove Morten Berge. The church seats about 450 people. The church was consecrated on 28 May 2000 by the Bishop Ernst Baasland.

== See also ==
- List of churches in Rogaland
