= Haugsgjerd =

Haugsgjerd is a Norwegian surname. Notable people with the surname include:

- Hilde Haugsgjerd (born 1952), Norwegian newspaper editor
- Svein Haugsgjerd (born 1942), Norwegian psychiatrist and psychoanalyst
