= Eike =

Eike is a masculine, as well as feminine, given name and a surname. Notable people with the name include:

== Given name ==
- Eike Batista (born 1956), entrepreneur
- Eike Bram (born 1965), handball player
- Eike Duarte (born 1997), actor
- Eike Duckwitz (born 1980), field hockey player
- Eike Geisel (1945–1997), journalist and essayist
- Eike Christian Hirsch (1937–2022), journalist and author
- Eike Holsten (born 1983), German politician
- Eike Immel (born 1960), footballer and manager
- Eike Moriz or Ike Moriz (born 1972), singer, songwriter and actor
- Eike Onnen (born 1982), high jumper
- Eike Pulver or Astrid Frank (born 1945), German actress
- Eike of Repgow (c. 1180 – c. 1233), medieval German administrator
- Eike Wilm Schulte (1939–2025), operatic baritone

== Surname ==
- James Eike (1911–1983), American birdwatcher
- Roberta Eike, American oceanographer and marine geologist
- Sten Ove Eike (born 1981), footballer
