= Pollestad =

Village in Klepp Municipality, Norway

- Village
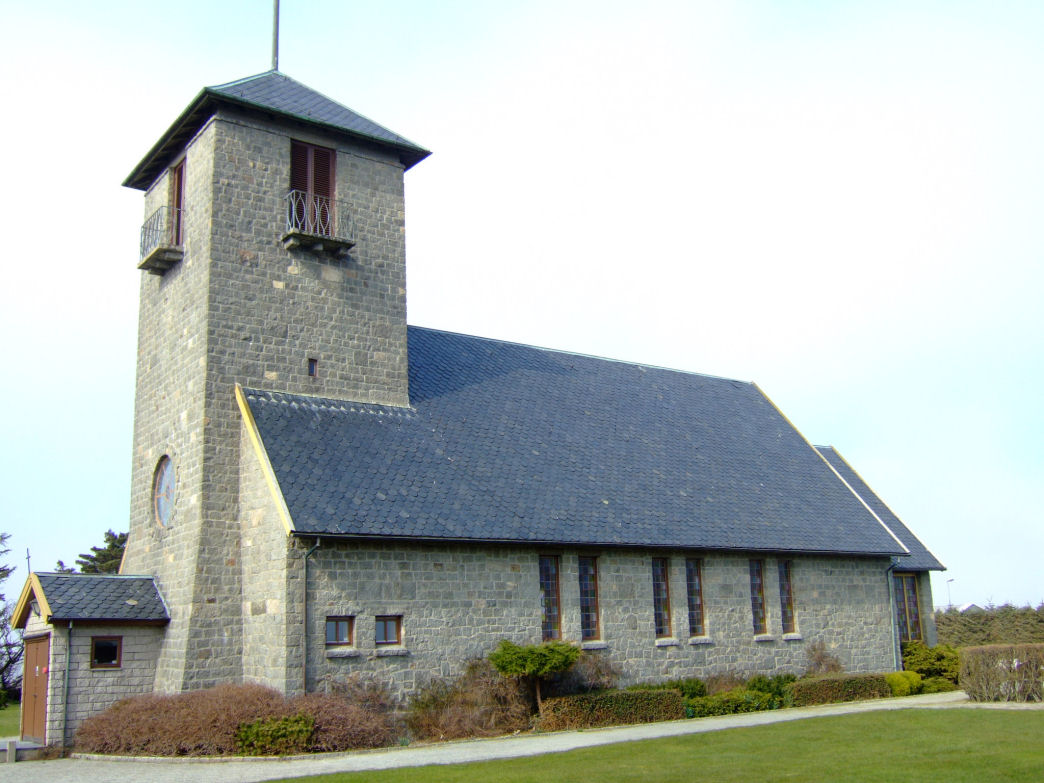
- View of the village church
- Interactive map of Pollestad
- Coordinates: 58.71802°N 5.56859°E
- Country: Norway
- Region: Western Norway
- County: Rogaland
- District: Jæren
- Municipality: Klepp Municipality

Area
  - Total: 0.46 km^{2} (0.18 sq mi)
- Elevation: 18 m (59 ft)

Population (2025)
  - Total: 827
  - Density: 1,798/km^{2} (4,660/sq mi)
- Time zone: UTC+01:00 (CET)
  - Summer (DST): UTC+02:00 (CEST)
- Post Code: 4343 Orre

Pollestad is a village in Klepp Municipality in Rogaland county, Norway. The village is located south of the lake Orrevatnet and about 5 kilometres (3.1 mi) southwest of the town of Bryne. Orre Church is located in Pollestad. It was built in 1950 to replace the nearly 800-year-old Old Orre Church located 3 kilometres (1.9 mi) to the northwest in the village of Orre.

The 0.46-square-kilometre (110-acre) village had a population (2025) of 827 and a population density of 1,798 inhabitants per square kilometre (4,660/sq mi). The village has a store, gas station, school, day care, and sports club.
