= Old Orre Church =

Church in Rogaland, Norway

- Orre gamle kirke
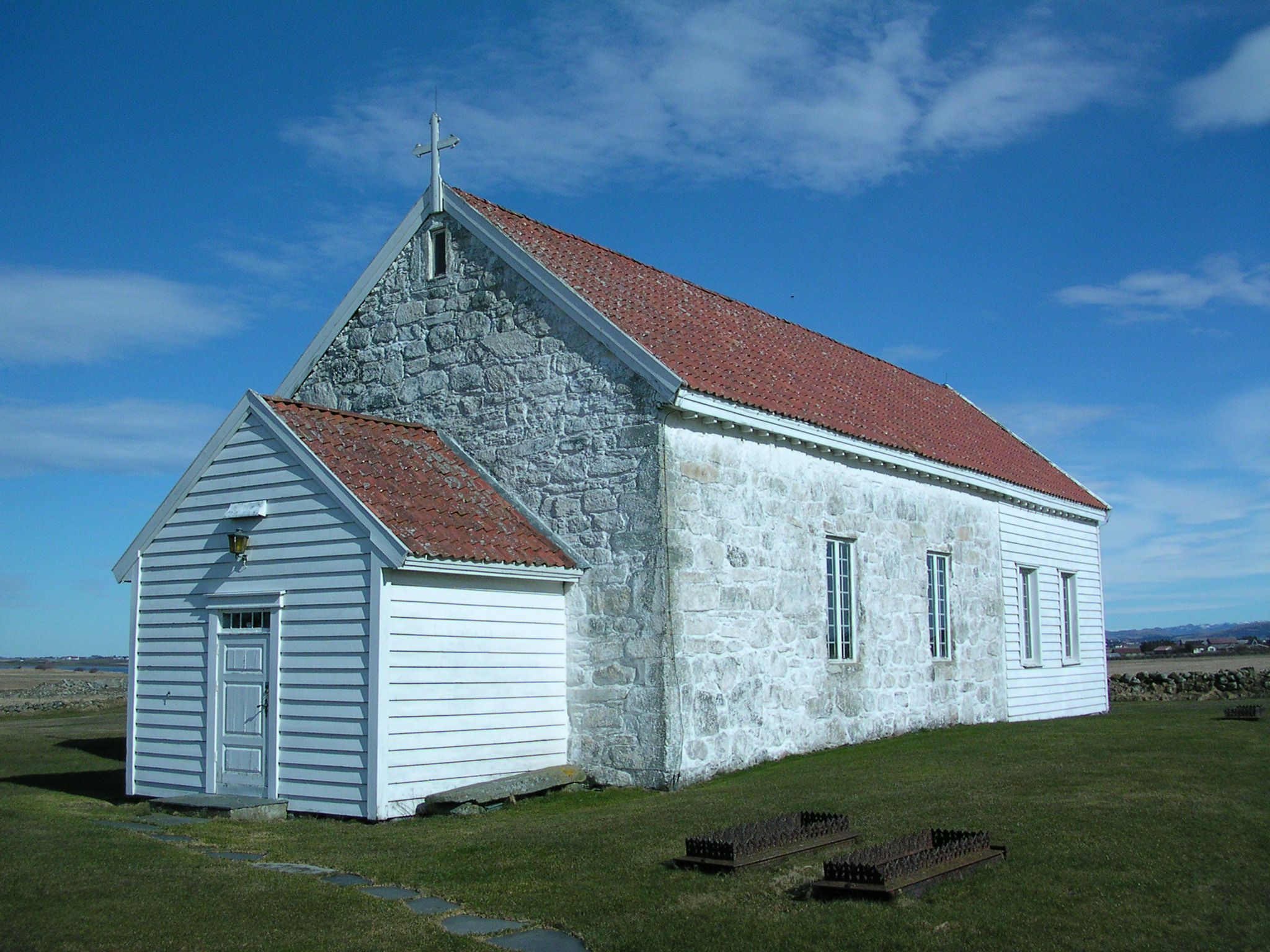
- View of the church
- Old Orre Church
- 58.731388°N 05.529463°E
- Location: Klepp Municipality, Rogaland
- Country: Norway
- Denomination: Church of Norway
- Previous denomination: Catholic Church
- Churchmanship: Evangelical Lutheran

History
- Status: Parish church
- Founded: c. 1250

Architecture
- Functional status: Active
- Architect: English monks
- Architectural type: Long church
- Style: Romanesque
- Completed: c. 1250 (776 years ago)

Specifications
- Capacity: 150
- Materials: Stone

Administration
- Diocese: Stavanger bispedømme
- Deanery: Jæren prosti
- Parish: Orre
- Norwegian Cultural Heritage Site
- Type: Church
- Status: Automatically protected
- ID: 5339

Old Orre Church (Norwegian: Orre gamle kirke) is a parish church of the Church of Norway in Klepp Municipality in Rogaland county, Norway. It is located in the village of Orre. It formerly was the main church for the Orre parish which is part of the Jæren prosti (deanery) in the Diocese of Stavanger. The small stone church was built in a long church style around the year 1250 using designs by English monks. The church seats about 150 people. It is situated on a small sandy strip of land between the lake Orrevatnet and the Orrestranda beach along the North Sea.

== History ==
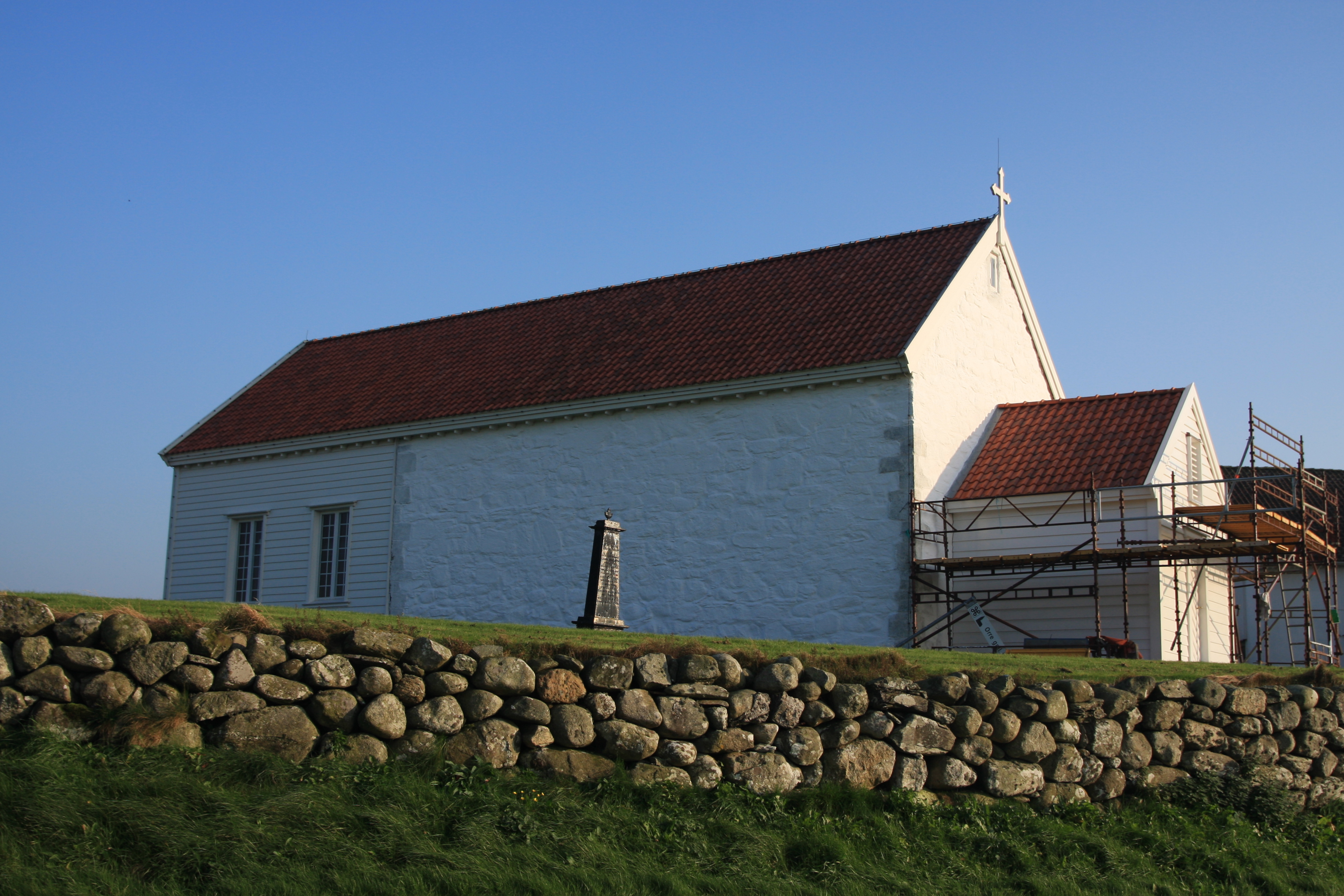
View of the church

The earliest existing historical records of the church date back to the year 1448, but the church was likely built in a Romanesque style around the year 1250 by monks from England. The original stone church measured about 8 by 12.5 metres (26 ft × 41 ft). The thick walls are constructed of soapstone which have been plastered and painted white.

In 1865, the church was enlarged and renovated. A wooden addition extending the nave an additional 8 metres (26 ft) to the east was constructed as well as a small porch at the west entrance to the building. Also during this renovation, the original small, arched windows were removed and much larger rectangular windows were installed, greatly changing the appearance of the building. During the renovation, embalmed corpses were found buried under the altar of the old church. The bodies were very well preserved. They were reburied under the new location of the altar after the renovation was completed.

In 1950, the "new" Orre Church was completed in the nearby village of Pollestad. After the completion of the new church, the old church was taken out of regular use. It is now a museum, but it is still occasionally used for special services or weddings.

== See also ==
- List of churches in Rogaland
