= Randaberg Stadion =

Football stadium in Randaberg, Rogaland, Norway

- Interactive map of Randaberg Stadion
- Location: Randaberg Municipality, Norway
- Coordinates: 59.0068°N 5.619538°E
- Capacity: 3,000
- Record attendance: Approx. 3,500
- Field size: 107 by 68 metres (351 ft × 223 ft)

Tenant
- Randaberg IL (football)

Randaberg Stadion is an association football stadium just outside the village of Randaberg in Randaberg Municipality in Rogaland county, Norway. It is the home ground of the Randaberg IL football team. The stadium was renovated and expanded in 2005.

The record attendance is about 3,500, during a 2007 Norwegian Championship where Randaberg played Viking. That record attendance was in excess of the stadium's overall capacity of around 3,000 (1,033 seating and around 1,900 standing places).
