= Hanne Skartveit =

Jurist and Norwegian journalist

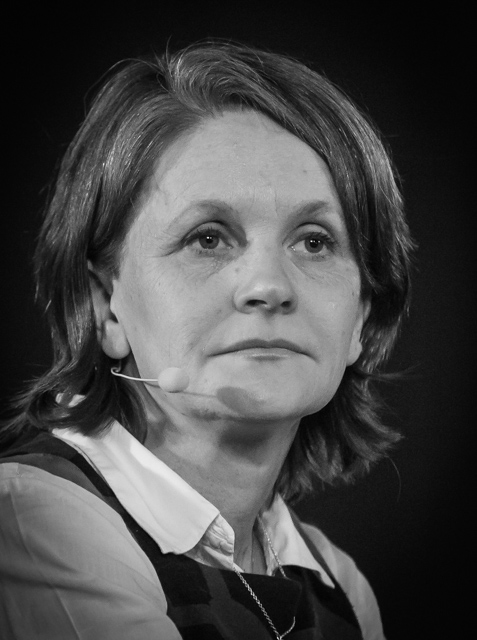
- Skartveit in 2015
- Born: 13 April 1966 (age 59); Oslo, Norway
- Education: Jurist, social scientist
- Occupations: Journalist and editor
- Father: Andreas Skartveit
- Awards: SKUP diploma Gullpennen

Hanne Skartveit (born 13 April 1966) is a Norwegian journalist and political editor.

== Biography ==
Skartveit was born in Oslo, and is the daughter of journalist, magazine editor and publisher Andreas Skartveit.

In the 1980s, she was a student and was active in student politics at the University of Oslo. She worked as journalist for the newspaper Arbeiderbladet from 1990 to 1991, and has worked for Verdens Gang (VG) since 1991. She was awarded a SKUP diploma (a Norwegian journalism award) in 1999, for the project Fylkespolitikerne - politikkens lønnsadel, revealing lucrative benefits for regional politicians.

She graduated as a Candidate of Law from the University of Oslo in 2004, and has a master's degree in social sciences, from Johns Hopkins University, United States, in 2006.

She assumed the position of political editor for VG from 2009, succeeding Olav Versto. In 2012 she was awarded the Gullpennen (Golden Pen) prize by the Riksmål Society.

== Publications ==
- Brussel tur retur. with Anders Bjartnes. Oslo: Tiden Norsk Forlag. 1995.
