= Svein Haugsgjerd =

Norwegian psychiatrist and psychoanalyst

- Born: Svein Fredrik Ingemann Haugsgjerd; August 3, 1942 (age 83); Åmot, Norway
- Scientific career
- Fields: Psychotherapy of psychotic states
- Institutions: Oslo University Hospital, Gaustad Hospital

Svein Haugsgjerd (born August 3, 1942) is a Norwegian psychiatrist and psychoanalyst. He is notable for using psychodynamic psychotherapy to treat patients with schizophrenia.

He is influenced by the Kleinian tradition in psychoanalysis and by the French psychoanalyst Jacques Lacan, on whom Haugsgjerd wrote a book-length introduction in 1986.

He has published extensively on the field of psychodynamic psychiatry in Norwegian. Several of his books, including textbooks, have been translated into other Nordic languages.

== Career ==
"Psychoanalytic work is not essentially about practising a treatment technique learnt through years of proper training. Rather, it is about–on the basis of this training–exposing oneself to the emotional impact of the presence of the particular patient, trying to keep his or her turbulent emotions in mind at all times, and remaining inspired by the ultimate faith in the benevolence of the internal parental objects."

— Donald Meltzer's Concept «The Aesthetic Conflict» (2006, p. 142).

Haugsgjerd was employed at Gaustad Hospital, a large psychiatric hospital in Oslo, from 1973 to 2012. He was chief physician from 1988 to 1992.

In 1975 Haugsgjerd chose Donald Meltzer, a psychoanalyst who made important contributions to the Kleinian tradition in psychoanalysis, as his mentor.

In 1977 Haugsgjerd and colleagues established the experimental treatment unit Kastanjebakken at Gaustad Hospital, which drew on Kleinian and neo-Kleinian ideas about treatment. Haugsgjerd took a leading role from 1977 to 1982. The unit offered younger patients (age < 40) diagnosed with schizophrenia, with a duration of illness ≥ 3 years, a combination of long-term individual psychotherapy and milieu therapy. A follow-up study of the 27 first participants concluded that one-third of the patients had good outcomes.

Besides treating patients, Haugsgjerd was responsible for supervision and teaching at Gaustad Hospital. From 2000 to 2010 he taught and supervised colleagues at Stavropol Regional Psychoanalytical Association in Russia. In 2003 he was appointed as a professor II (adjunct professor) at the Centre for Practical Knowledge, Nord University, in Bodø.

== Publications in English ==
- 1987 "Toward a theory for milieu treatment of hospitalized borderline patients", in: The Borderline Patient: Emerging Concepts in Diagnosis, Psychodynamics, and Treatment, Vol. II (eds. Grotstein James S., Solomon Marion F., Lang Joan A.). Hillsdale, N.J.: Analytic Press, pp. 211–226.
- 1993 "Mental geography in psychotic states", in: Crossing the Borders: psychotherapy of schizophrenia (editor Jens Bolvig Hansen). Ludvika: Dualis Förlag, pp. 29–40.
- 1994 "Can psychoanalytic theory contribute to the understanding and treatment of schizophrenia?", Acta Psychiatrica Scandinavica, 90(suppl 384):153–6.
- 2006 "Donald Meltzer's Concept «The Aesthetic Conflict»", in: Estetikk: sansing, erkjennelse og verk (editor Bente Larsen). Oslo: Unipub, pp. 131–143.
- 2013 (with Per Anthi). "A note on the history of the Norwegian Psychoanalytic Society from 1933 to 1945", International Journal of Psychoanalysis, 94(4):715–24.
- 2016 "Listening and the voice", Scandinavian Psychoanalytic Review, 39(1):80–83.
