= Mydland =

Mydland is a surname. Notable people with the surname include:

- Brent Mydland (1952–1990), American keyboardist and singer
- Gordon Mydland (1922–2022), American attorney and politician
