= Andreas Skartveit =

Norwegian journalist, magazine editor and publisher

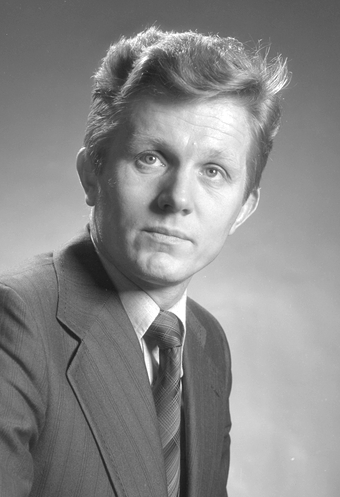
- Born: 12 January 1937 (age 89); Finnøy Municipality, Norway
- Occupations: Journalist, magazine editor and publisher
- Children: Hanne Skartveit

Andreas Skartveit (born 12 January 1937) is a Norwegian journalist, magazine editor and publisher. He was born in Finnøy Municipality. He worked for the Norwegian Broadcasting Corporation from 1962 to 1972. He edited the cultural and political magazine Syn og Segn from 1972 to 1978, and was also manager of the publishing house Det Norske Samlaget during the same period. From 1980 to 1990, he was manager of the publishing house Gyldendal Norsk Forlag.
