= Orre Church =

Church in Rogaland, Norway

- Orre kyrkje
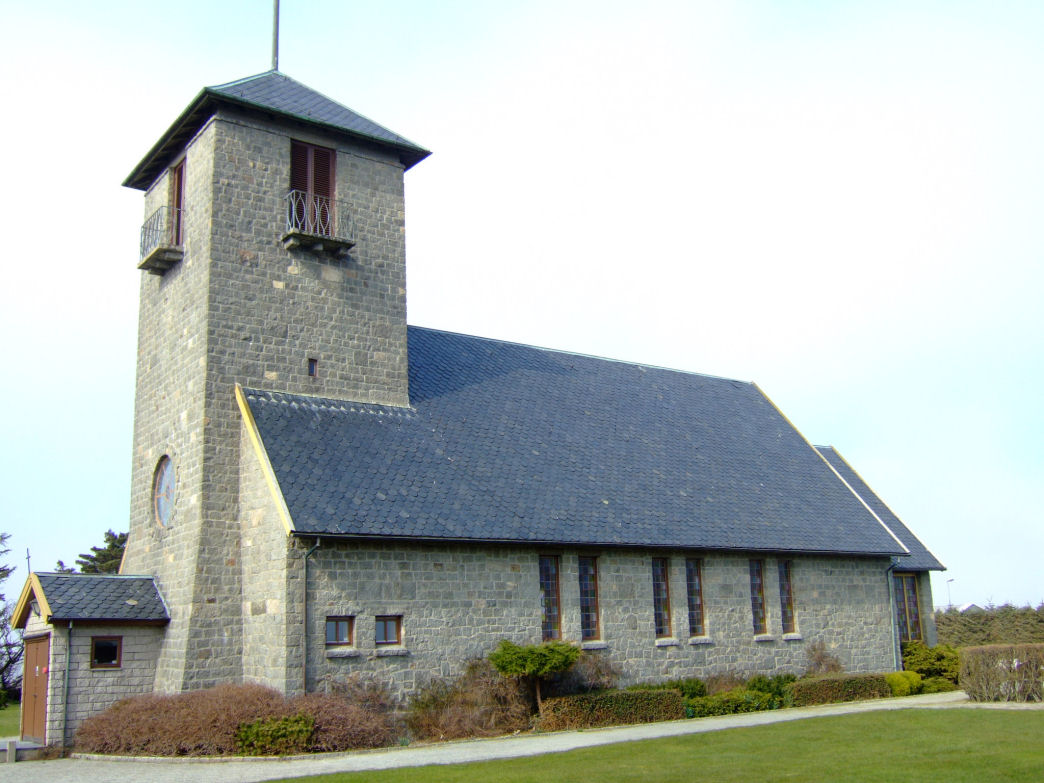
- View of the church
- Orre Church
- 58.715485°N 05.564353°E
- Location: Klepp Municipality, Rogaland
- Country: Norway
- Denomination: Church of Norway
- Churchmanship: Evangelical Lutheran

History
- Status: Parish church
- Founded: 1950
- Consecrated: 28 May 1950

Architecture
- Functional status: Active
- Architect(s): Gustav Helland and Endre Årreberg
- Architectural type: Long church
- Completed: 1950 (76 years ago)

Specifications
- Capacity: 250
- Materials: Stone

Administration
- Diocese: Stavanger bispedømme
- Deanery: Jæren prosti
- Parish: Orre
- Norwegian Cultural Heritage Site
- Type: Church
- Status: Not protected
- ID: 85238

Orre Church (Norwegian: Orre kyrkje) is a parish church of the Church of Norway in Klepp Municipality in Rogaland county, Norway. It is located in the village of Pollestad. It is the main church for the Orre parish which is part of the Jæren prosti (deanery) in the Diocese of Stavanger. The gray, stone church was built in a long church style in 1950 using designs by the architects Gustav Helland and Endre Årreberg. The church seats about 250 people.

== History ==
The church was built to replace the centuries-old Old Orre Church located in the nearby village of Orre. This church was consecrated on 28 May 1950 by the Bishop Karl Martinussen.

== See also ==
- List of churches in Rogaland
