= Krossberg =

Village in Stavanger Municipality, Norway

Krossberg Krossberget
- Village
- Interactive map of Krossberg
- Coordinates: 58.96651°N 5.64584°E
- Country: Norway
- Region: Western Norway
- County: Rogaland
- District: Jæren
- Municipality: Stavanger Municipality

Area
  - Total: 0.12 km^{2} (0.046 sq mi)
- Elevation: 28 m (92 ft)

Population (2025)
  - Total: 400
  - Density: 3,333/km^{2} (8,630/sq mi)
- Time zone: UTC+01:00 (CET)
  - Summer (DST): UTC+02:00 (CEST)
- Post Code: 4047 Hafrsfjord

Krossberg is a village in Stavanger Municipality in Rogaland county, Norway. The village is located in the city of Stavanger in the borough of Madla between the Stokkavatnet and Hålandsvatnet lakes.

The 0.12-square-kilometre (30-acre) village has a population (2025) of 400 and a population density of 3,333 inhabitants per square kilometre (8,630/sq mi).
