= Asbjørn Vinjar =

Norwegian engineer and civil servant (1925–2019)

- Born: 16 November 1925
- Died: 25 January 2019 (aged 93)

Asbjørn Gudbrand Vinjar (16 November 1925 – 25 January 2019) was a Norwegian engineer and civil servant.

== Life and career ==
Vinjar graduated with the siv.ing. degree from the Norwegian Institute of Technology in 1952. He spent his career in the Norwegian Water Resources and Electricity Agency. He headed the electricity department from 1962 to 1978 and was the director of the electricity and energy from 1978 to 1990. It was renamed to the Water Resources and Energy Agency in 1986 after Statkraft was split out. Vinjar died on 25 January 2019, at the age of 93.
