= James Eike =

James W. Eike
- Born: September 29, 1911; Woodbridge, Virginia
- Died: February 8, 1983 (aged 71); Fairfax, Virginia
- Known for: birdwatcher and former president of the Virginia Society of Ornithology
- Awards: James W. Eike Service Award was created by the Society in his honor in 1984

James W. Eike (September 29, 1911 – February 8, 1983) was a birdwatcher and former president of the Virginia Society of Ornithology. The James W. Eike Service Award was created by the Society in his honor in 1984. Other than being president ( 1950–1952, 1969–1971; VP 1967-1968), he was also a long-standing executive committee member of the Virginia Society of Ornithology, as well as a chairman of various sections.

== Biography ==
Eike was born in Woodbridge, Virginia. He graduated from Georgetown University in 1932 and began a federal career in 1934 with the U.S. Public Health Service. He later worked for the Civil Service Commission and joined the U.S. State Department in 1946. He retired in 1970 from the U.S. Information Agency.

He lived in Northern Virginia around Falls Church and Fairfax. He kept detailed field notebooks which recorded his observation of birds, as well as weather conditions, for over 30 years, rarely missing a day. His observations were concentrated near his home in Northern Virginia, but also included Maryland, Washington D.C., and North Carolina. Eike joined the Virginia Society of Ornithology in 1933, and was an active member and officer of the Society for the rest of his life.

Eike's personal papers are held by the Smithsonian Institution Archives. His collection of 111 field books is part of Smithsonian's Field Book Registry; they have been scanned and posted online.
