= Randaberg Church =

Church in Rogaland, Norway

- Randaberg kirke
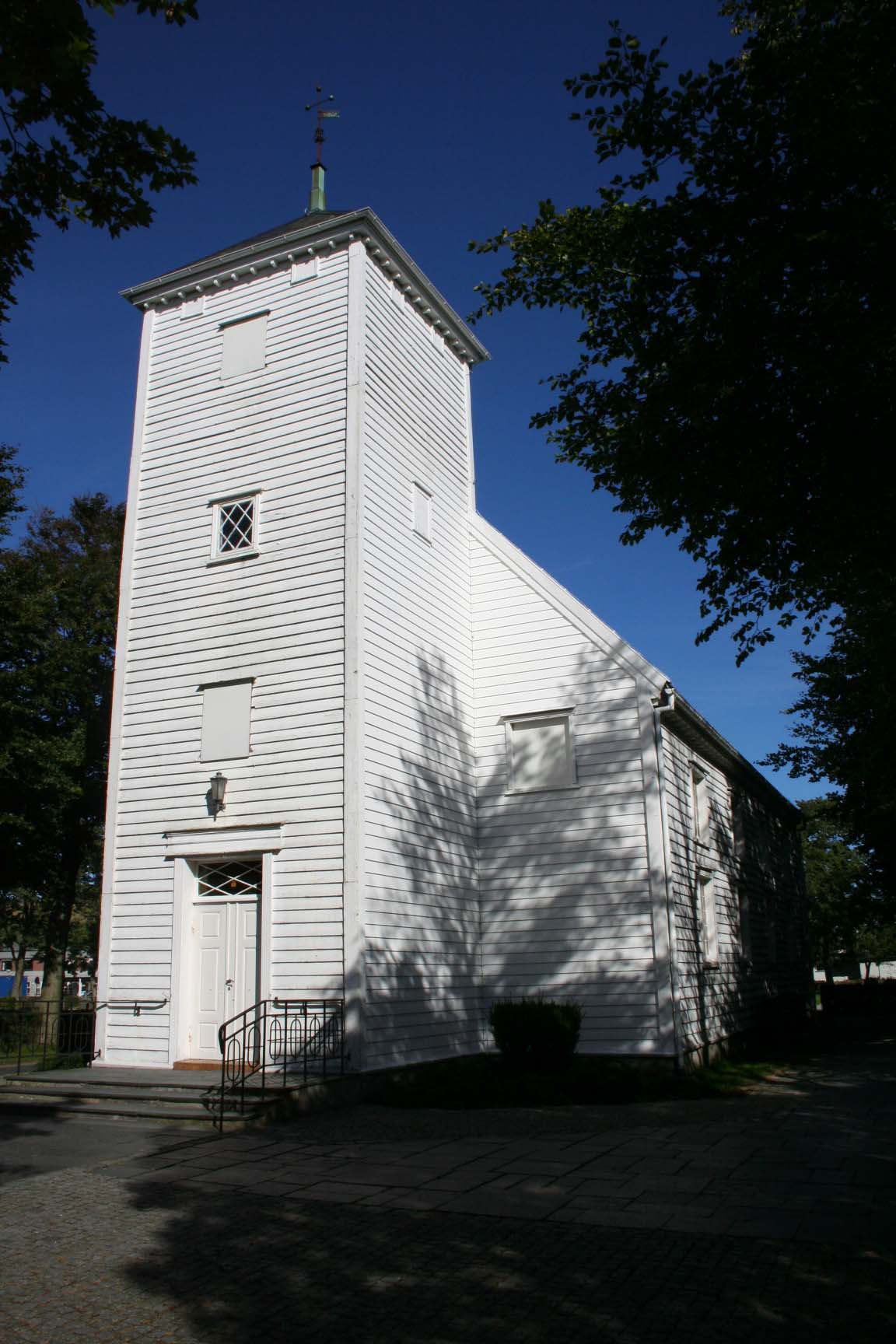
- View of the church
- Randaberg Church
- 58.99978°N 5.619379°E
- Location: Randaberg Municipality, Rogaland
- Country: Norway
- Denomination: Church of Norway
- Churchmanship: Evangelical Lutheran

History
- Status: Parish church
- Founded: 13th century
- Consecrated: 1845

Architecture
- Functional status: Active
- Architect: Hans Linstow
- Architectural type: Long church
- Completed: 1845

Specifications
- Capacity: 460
- Materials: Wood

Administration
- Diocese: Stavanger bispedømme
- Deanery: Tungenes prosti
- Parish: Randaberg
- Norwegian Cultural Heritage Site
- Type: Church
- Status: Automatically protected
- ID: 85268

Randaberg Church (Norwegian: Randaberg kirke) is a parish church of the Church of Norway in Randaberg Municipality in Rogaland county, Norway. It is located in the village of Randaberg. It is one of the two churches for the Randaberg parish which is part of the Tungenes prosti (deanery) in the Diocese of Stavanger. The white, wooden church was built in a long church design in 1845 using designs by the architect Hans Linstow. The church seats about 460 people.

== History ==
The earliest existing historical records of the church date back to the year 1316, but the church was not new that year. The first church in Randaberg was a stave church and it was located about 2.35 kilometres (1.46 mi) north of the present site of the church. The original church sat just east of the 73-metre (240 ft) tall Randabergfjellet mountain, a notable geographic feature in the municipality. In 1415, the church underwent some repairs and renovations. During the 1600s, the old church was torn down and replaced with a new timber-framed building. In 1845, a new church was built about 2.35 kilometres (1.46 mi) to the south in what is now the village of Randaberg. After the new church was completed, the old church was torn down.

== See also ==
- List of churches in Rogaland
