= Svarthola =

Cave and archaeological site in Norway

- Vistehola / Vistehulen
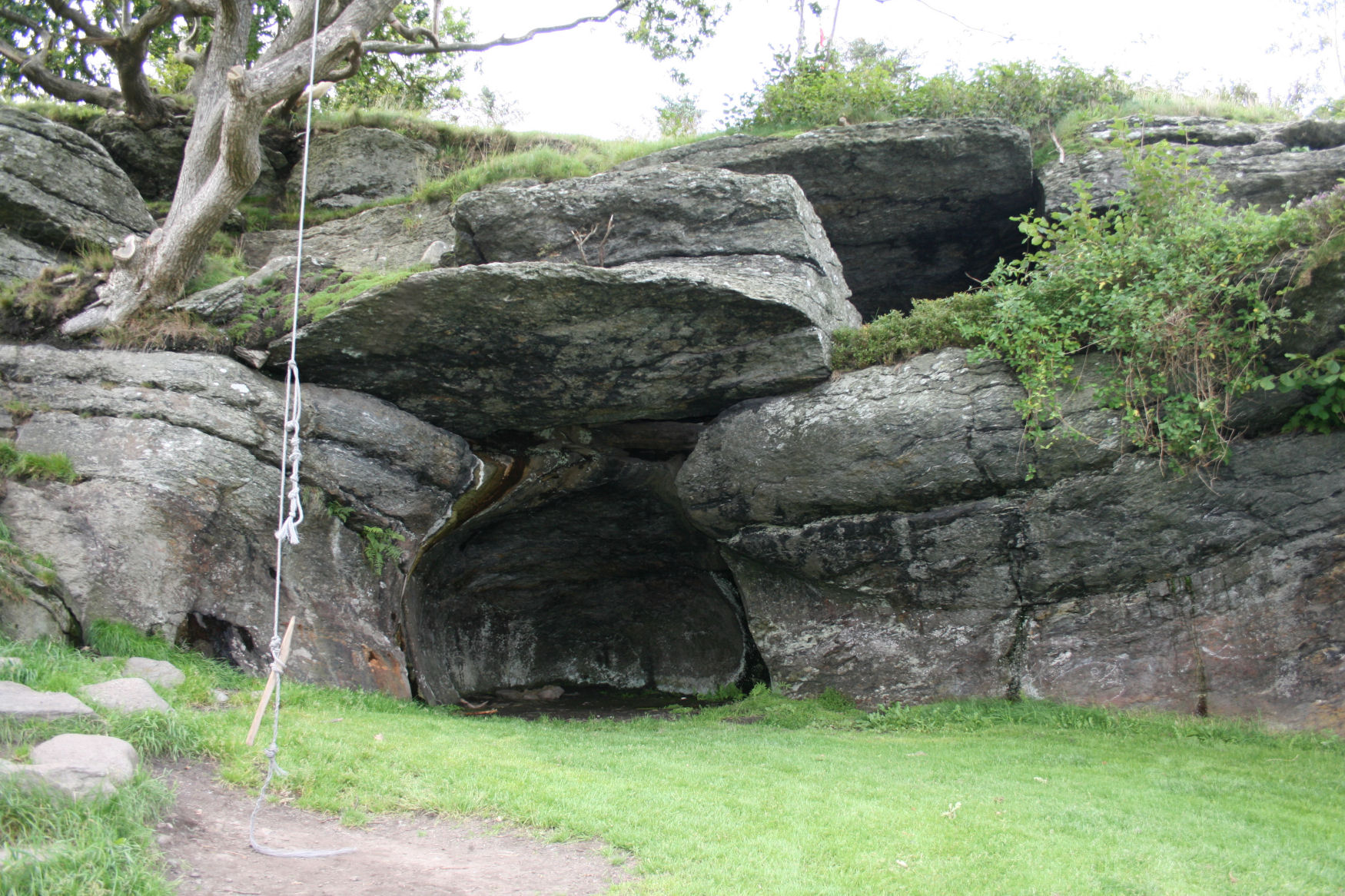
- View of the cave entrance
- Interactive map of Svarthola
- Location: Rogaland, Norway
- Coordinates: 58°59′14″N 05°35′49″E
- Depth: 9 m (30 ft)
- Length: 5 m (16 ft)
- Height variation: 3 m (9.8 ft)
- Elevation: 16 m (52 ft)

Svarthola or Vistehola is a cave and an archaeological site, located in Randaberg Municipality in Rogaland county, Norway. The 9 m (30 ft) deep cavern is located on the Viste farm, about 10 km (6.2 mi) northwest of the city of Stavanger, situated near the shore of the Visteviga bay, at the mouth of the Hafrsfjorden. The site has yielded numerous Neolithic artifacts that have been excavated and discovered in and around the cave.

== History ==
The location served as a shelter for a group of about 25 people during the Neolithic since around 6,000 BCE. These people were mainly hunter-gatherers, who adopted a sedentary lifestyle based on agriculture around 4,000 BCE. The occupants of Vistehola engaged in hunting to maintain a diet, that largely consisted of wild boar. Faunal remains of moose and seal were also found. Since around 2,000 BCE, their major form of sustenance had shifted towards farming.

The site was first studied in 1907 and 1910, and again in 1939 and 1941. The discovered material is remarkably well preserved and provides comprehensive information on the prehistoric inhabitant's living conditions from between 8,000 and 6,000 years ago. Cultural layers were divided into four distinct strata, that correspond with the local Mesolithic and Neolithic era and the most recent sediment layer has been associated with the Iron Age. The greater discovery group includes hunting and fishing implements made of stone, antlers and bone as well as residue of shells and ornamental items.

The cave houses an inhabited area of approximately 100 square metres (1,100 sq ft) and is located about 250 metres (820 ft) north of today's shoreline. Excavation of the site revealed implement waste and also traces of funerals. At the east wall of the cave a skeleton of a juvenile boy (around 15 year old) was found who lived about 7,500 years ago. It represents one of the earliest known human remains in Norway.

== Media gallery ==
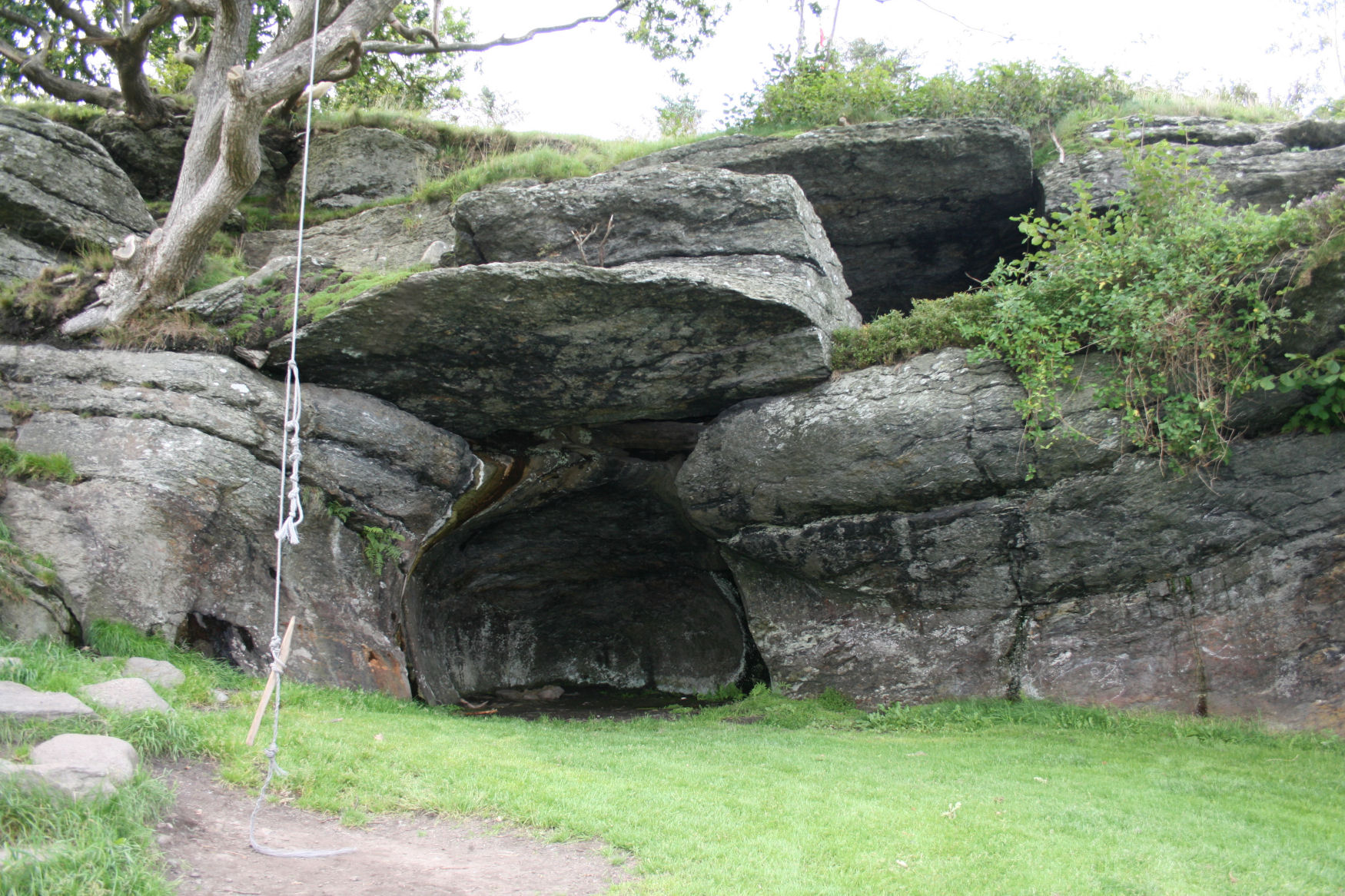
Entrance to the cave

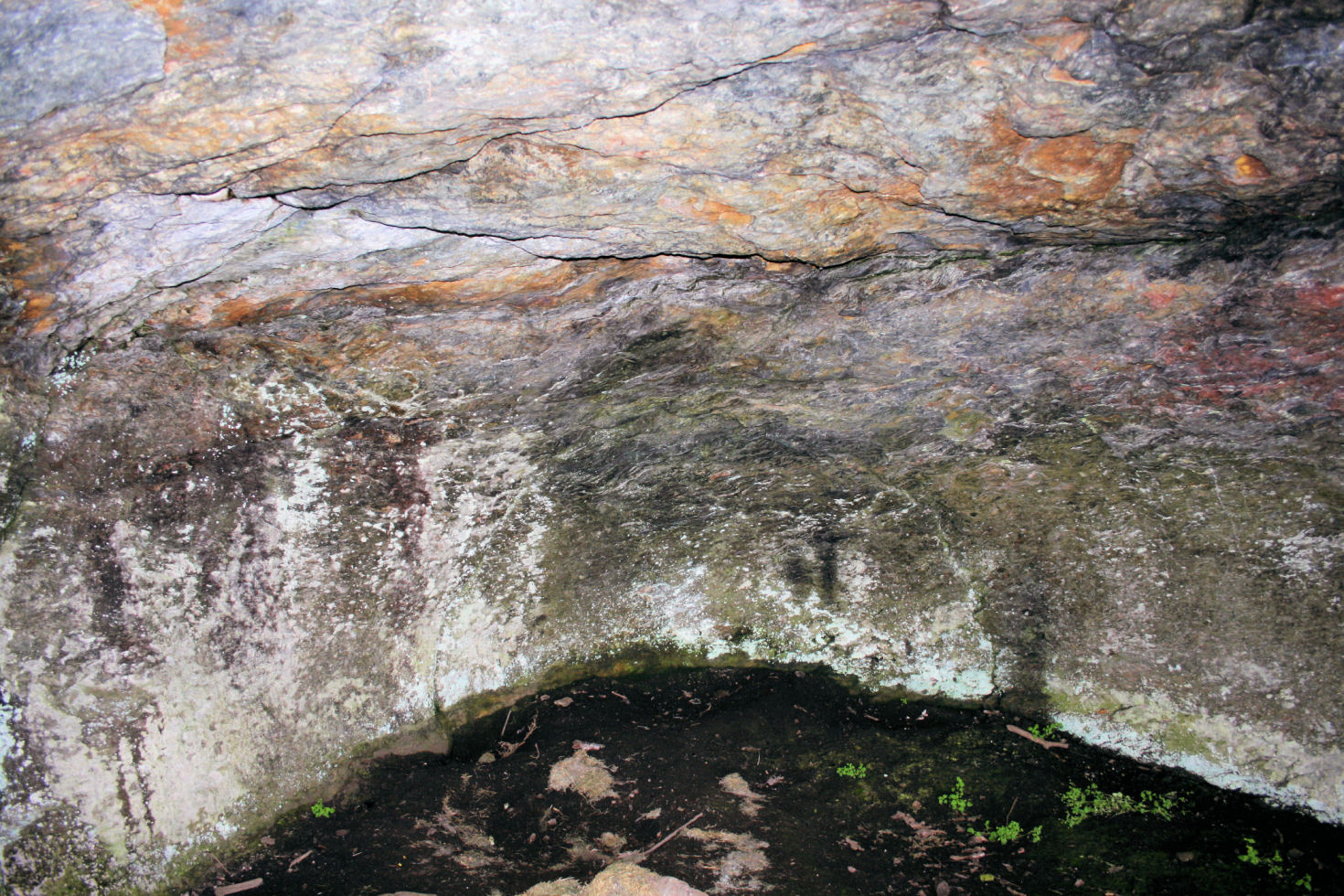
Interior of the cave

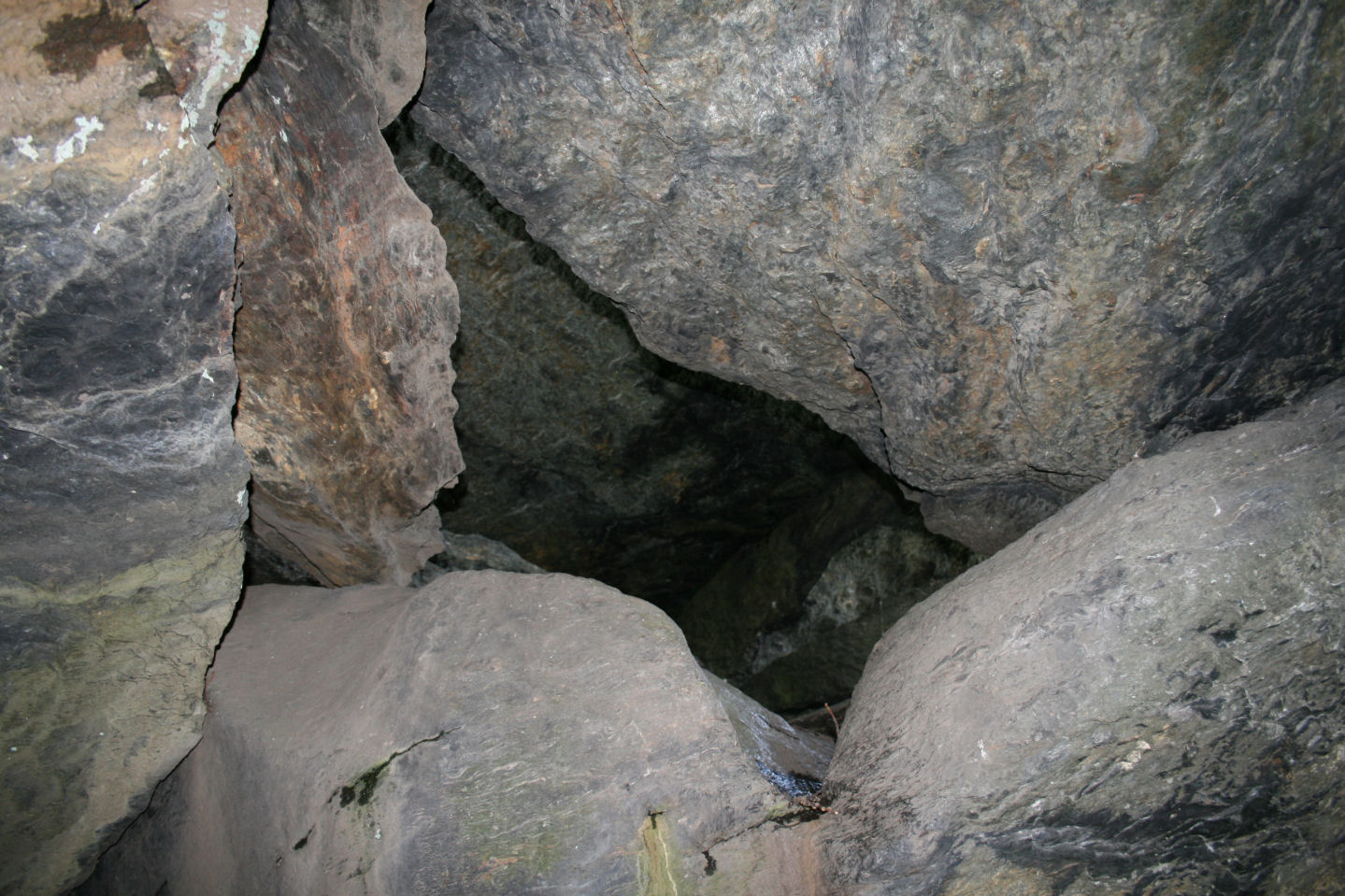
Ceiling of the cave

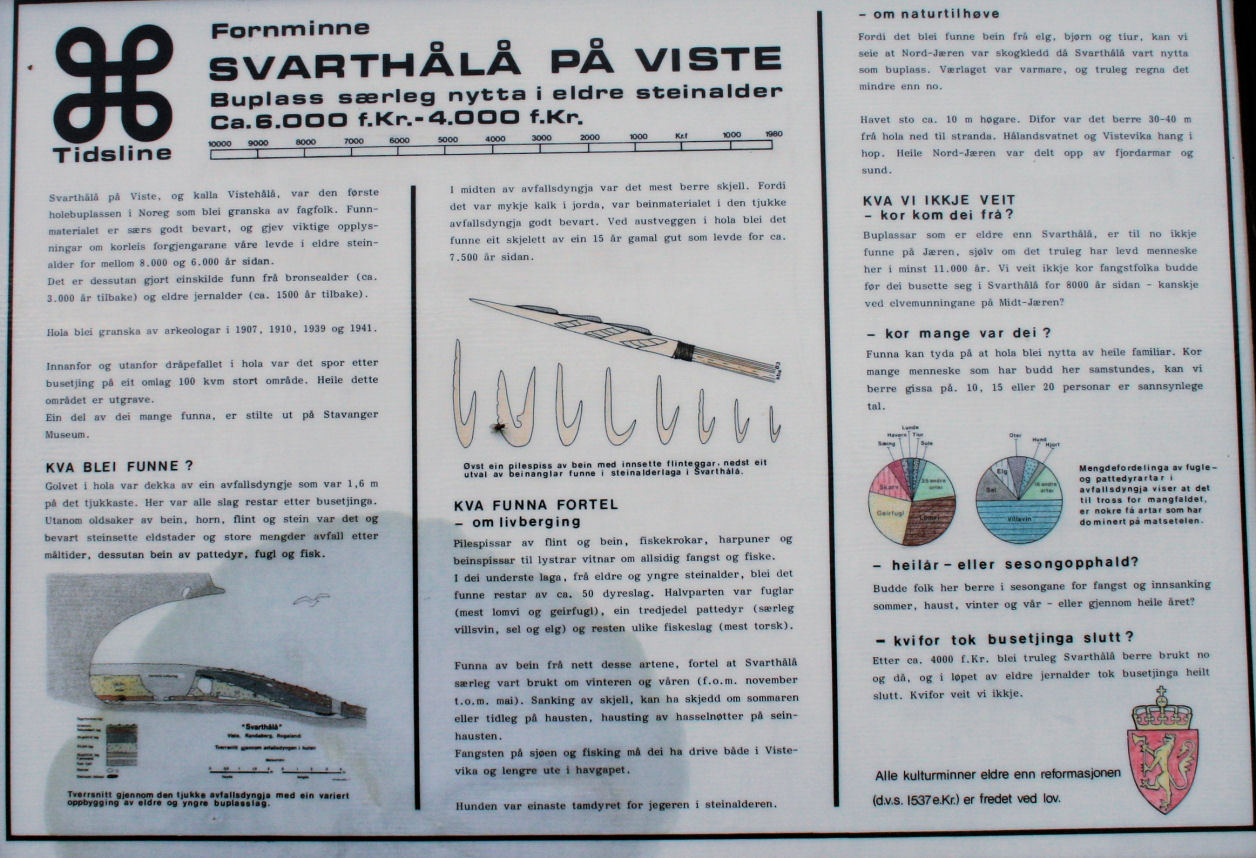
Svarthålå på Viste
