= Grødem =

Grødem Grødeim
- Village
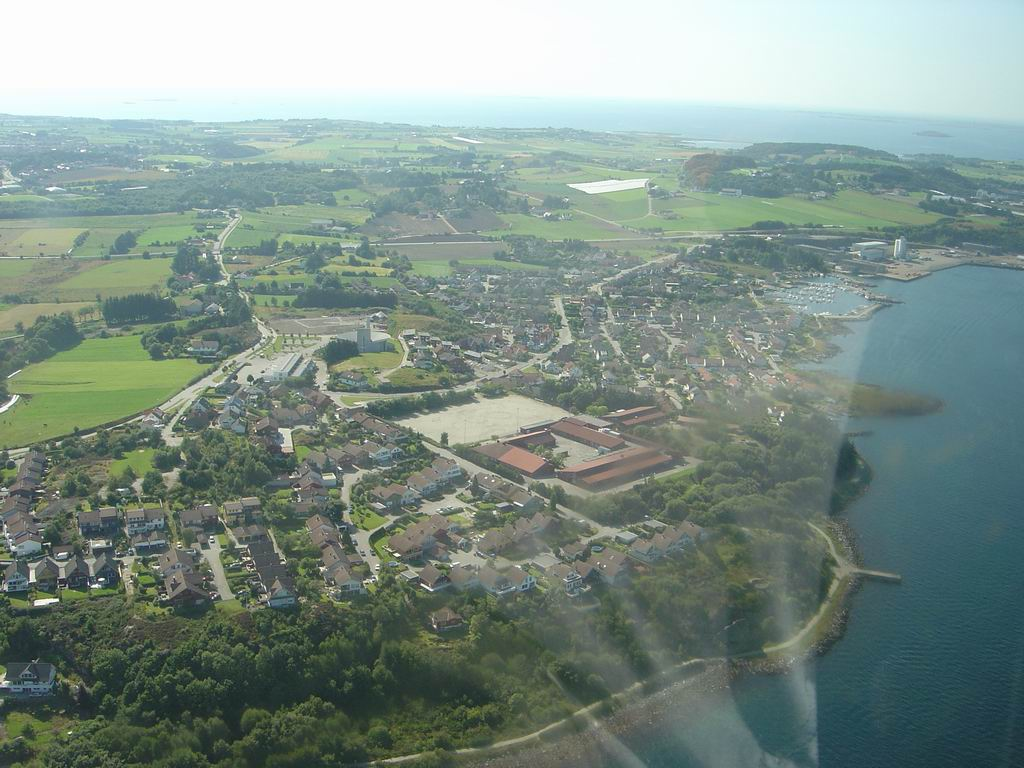
- View of the village looking north
- Interactive map of Grødem
- Coordinates: 59.00695°N 5.65052°E
- Country: Norway
- Region: Western Norway
- County: Rogaland
- District: Jæren
- Municipality: Randaberg Municipality
- Elevation: 26 m (85 ft)
- Time zone: UTC+01:00 (CET)
  - Summer (DST): UTC+02:00 (CEST)
- Post Code: 4070 Randaberg

Grødem is a village in Randaberg Municipality in Rogaland county, Norway. The village is a middle-class suburb of the city of Stavanger, located immediately to the south. The village is located along the Byfjorden at the northeastern tip of the Stavanger Peninsula, about 2 kilometres (1.2 mi) east of the village of Randaberg. The European route E39 highway runs along the west side of the village. The entrance to the Byfjord Tunnel lies at the north end of the village. Grødem Church is located in the village.
