= Skre =

Skre is a surname. Notable people with the surname include:

- Arnhild Skre (born 1952), Norwegian newspaper editor, press historian, and biographer
- Ivar Heming Skre (1897–1943), Norwegian resistance member
