= Orrevatnet =

Lake in Rogaland, Norway

- Interactive map of Orrevatnet
- Location: Klepp Municipality, Rogaland
- Coordinates: 58.76442°N 5.53914°E
- Basin countries: Norway
- Max. length: 5 kilometres (3.1 mi)
- Max. width: 2 kilometres (1.2 mi)
- Surface area: 8.04 km^{2} (3.10 sq mi)
- Shore length^{1}: 22.96 kilometres (14.27 mi)
- Surface elevation: 4 metres (13 ft)
- References: NVE
- ^{1} Shore length is not a well-defined measure.

Orrevatnet is a lake in Klepp Municipality in Rogaland county, Norway. The 8.04-square-kilometre (3.10 sq mi) lake is the largest lake in Jæren. The lake sits about 4 metres (13 ft) above sea level and it is situated along the seashore. The 500-to-2,500-metre (1,600 to 8,200 ft) wide sandy beach strip of land that separates the lake from the sea is home to one of Norway's longest sand beaches, Orrestranda. The village of Orre lies on this strip of land to the southeast of the lake.

== See also ==
- List of lakes in Norway
