= Orre, Rogaland =

Village in Klepp Municipality, Norway

Orre
- Village
- Interactive map of Orre
- Coordinates: 58.72915°N 5.52883°E
- Country: Norway
- Region: Western Norway
- County: Rogaland
- District: Jæren
- Municipality: Klepp Municipality
- Elevation: 6 m (20 ft)
- Time zone: UTC+01:00 (CET)
  - Summer (DST): UTC+02:00 (CEST)
- Post Code: 4343 Orre

Orre is a village and parish in Klepp Municipality in Rogaland county, Norway. The village is located just southwest of the lake Orrevatnet, between the lake and the ocean. Orre is the location of the Orrestranda beach, one of the longest sand beaches in Norway. The area is very flat, and it is primarily used for agriculture. The Old Orre Church, built in the 1200s, is located in Orre. The "new" Orre Church was built in 1950 in the nearby village of Pollestad, about 3 kilometres (1.9 mi) to the southeast.

== Media gallery ==
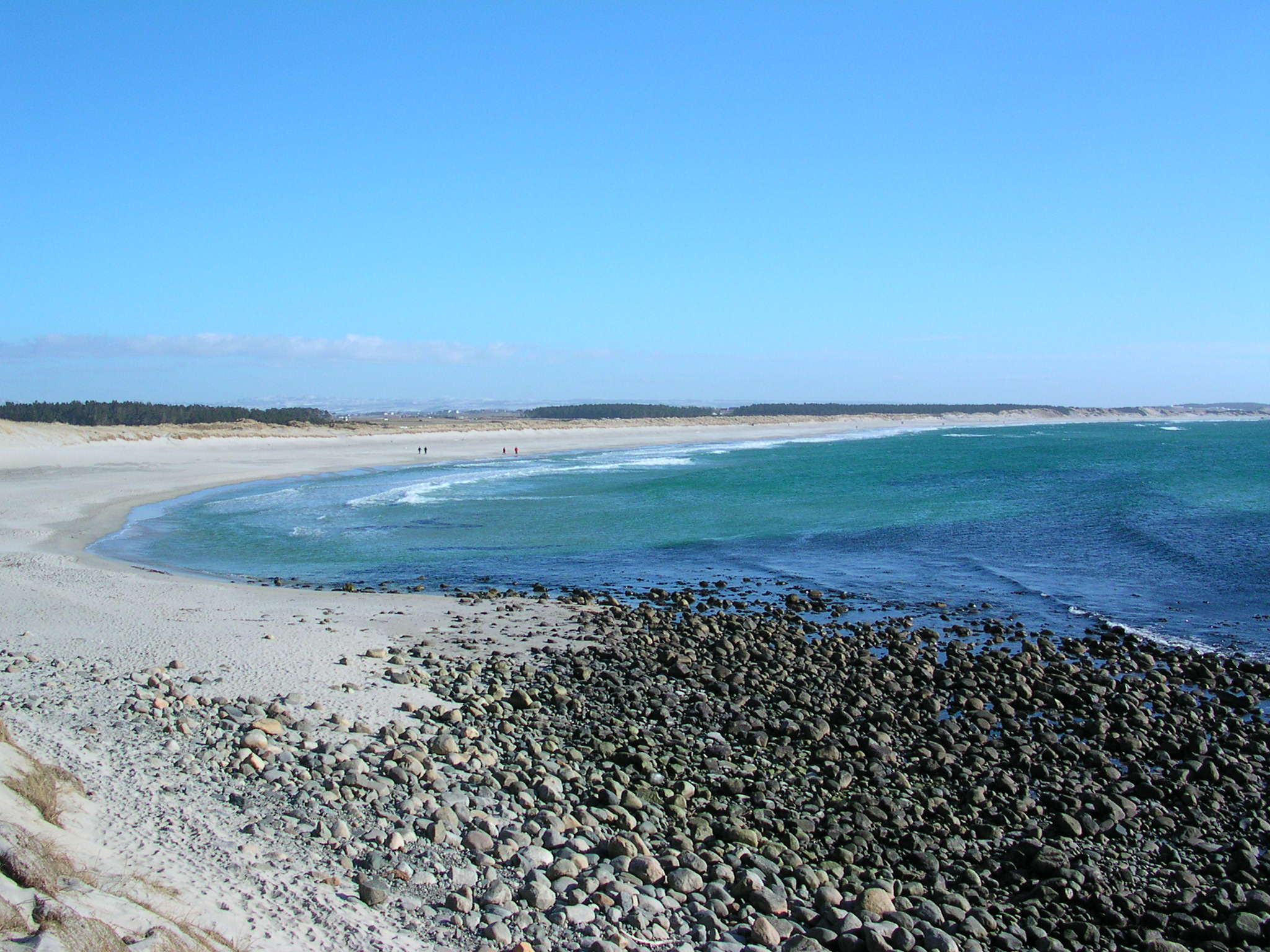
View of the local Orrestranda beach

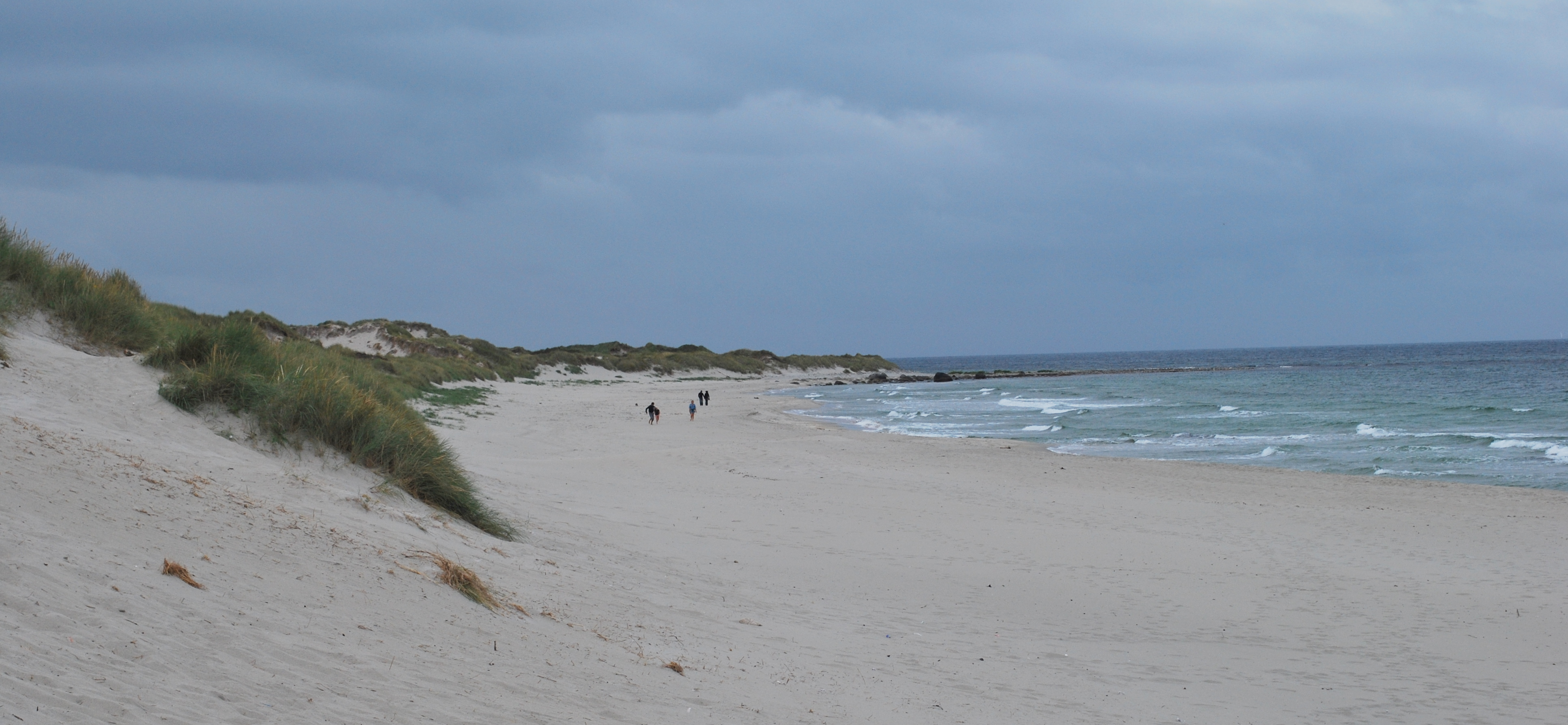
Another view of the beach

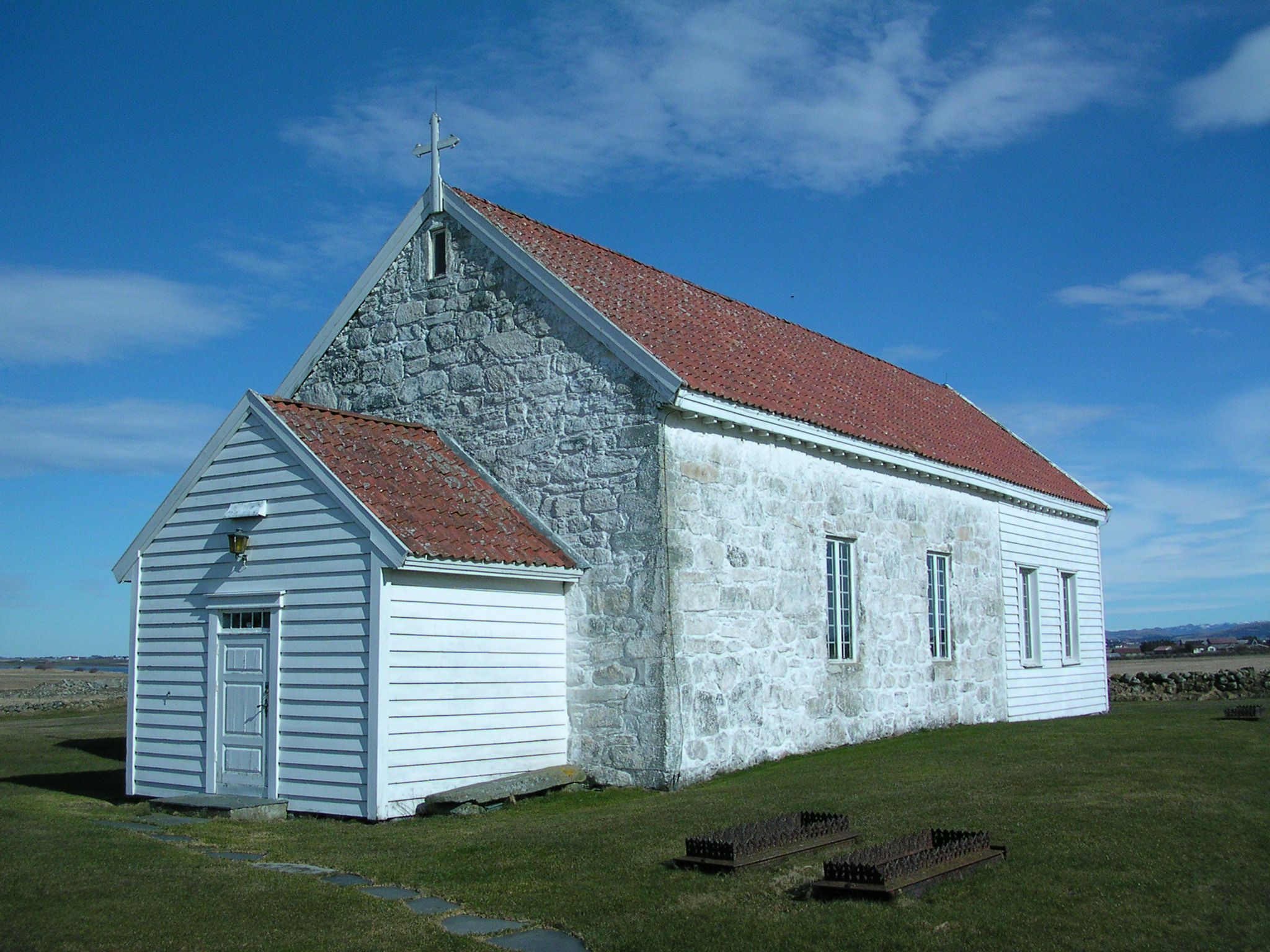
View of the Old Orre Church
