= Randaberg (village) =

Village in Rogaland, Norway

- Village
- Interactive map of Randaberg
- Coordinates: 58.99955°N 5.61874°E
- Country: Norway
- Region: Western Norway
- County: Rogaland
- District: Jæren
- Municipality: Randaberg Municipality
- Elevation: 32 m (105 ft)
- Time zone: UTC+01:00 (CET)
  - Summer (DST): UTC+02:00 (CEST)
- Post Code: 4070 Randaberg

Randaberg is the administrative centre of Randaberg Municipality in Rogaland county, Norway. The village is located at the northern end of the Stavanger Peninsula, about 2 kilometres (1.2 mi) west of the village of Grødem and about 7 kilometres (4.3 mi) northwest of the centre of the city of Stavanger. The European route E39 highway passes just outside of Randaberg to the east. The village is the site of the municipal administration for Randaberg Municipality as well as the site of Randaberg Church, built in a long church design in 1845.

Randaberg Stadion, the main stadium for the Randaberg IL sports club is located in the village of Randaberg.
