= Roberta Eike =

American oceanographer and marine geologist

Roberta Eike was an American oceanographer and marine geologist in the 1950s. Eike became aware of the Woods Hole Oceanographic Institution (WHOI) in 1954. After numerous unsuccessful attempts to gain permission to go to sea with her male counterparts, Eike secretly stowed away on one of her supervising professors' research missions, only to be discovered several hours into the voyage and physically abused as punishment.

Eike's consequent dismissal from the WHOI led to increased calls for women's rights in oceanography. Six years later, women were officially permitted to join WHOI sea-going research vessels.

== Career ==
Eike was a biology graduate student from Radcliffe. Eike had fellowships in 1955 and 1956 to study crustaceans with Clarke. While on scholarship with the Marine Biological Laboratory in Woods Hole, Massachusetts, Eike found out about the Woods Hole Oceanographic Institution. At Radcliffe, she capitalised on the opportunity to work with George Clarke, a senior WHOI authority on marine ecology and "pioneer in instrumentation". In September 1955, Eike wrote a short essay on the role of women in oceanography, exploring the reasons women were not welcome at sea.

=== Women's rights in oceanography ===
Until the 1960s, female scientists were severely discriminated against in the field and were barred from sailing on oceanographic vessels with their male counterparts. This prohibition stemmed from old taboos in myths and legends such as Homer's Odyssey. While this taboo prevailed in much of Western Europe, women had already led numerous major expeditions in the Arctic and Atlantic in Russia.

=== Voyage ===
In order to conduct her necessary research, Eike repeatedly requested to join sea voyages but was denied access to the sea every time. Worried that her research, fellowship and career could not succeed otherwise, she decided to take a chance on July 16, 1956, and snuck onto CARYN, the sea vessel employed for one of her supervising professors' research missions. In preparation for the voyage, Eike gathered "oranges, peaches, cookies, a change of socks and clothing, and a green cloth bag with jars to collect plankton". Once she boarded the vessel, Eike took up quarters in the bilge with the engine and extra stores.

However, after a few hours, rolling seas and nausea forced Eike to emerge from her hiding spot. She was discovered by the captain, Bob Munns, who did a 180-degree turn with CARYN upon her discovery. Perturbed by the traditional "no women at sea" principle, her supervisor George Clarke made Eike suffer the indignity of physical humiliation when "he held her over his knee and spanked her". For the rest of the voyage, Eike was confined to the captain's quarters.

On July 18, CARYN was pushed back to dock. As punishment for her decision, Eike was stripped of her Fellowship title and was quietly dismissed from the WHOI.

== Response and legacy ==
Following Eike's dismissal, many prominent figures in oceanography including Henry Stommel, Alfred Woodcock, Joanna and William Malkus, William von Arx, Dick Backus, and Valentine Worthington spoke out in defense of her.

Eike's dismissal sparked much debate and served as the catalyst for igniting conversation about the position of women at sea on WHOI vessels. Six years following her secret stowaway on CARYN, WHOI changed its regulations and women were officially permitted to join WHOI research vessels. Today, Eike is credited with having revolutionized the rights of female scientists at sea. Women now occupy top positions across the institution, having for instance piloted the submersible ALVIN, leading as Chief Scientists and even having served as the institutions first female president. Moreover, the WHOI established the WHOI Women's Committee, which actively seeks to continue the dialogue in regards to continued improvement initiatives that ensure women are treated as equals and with respect both at shore and at sea.
