= Randaberg Municipality =

Municipality in Rogaland, Norway

Randaberg Municipality Randaberg kommune
- Municipality
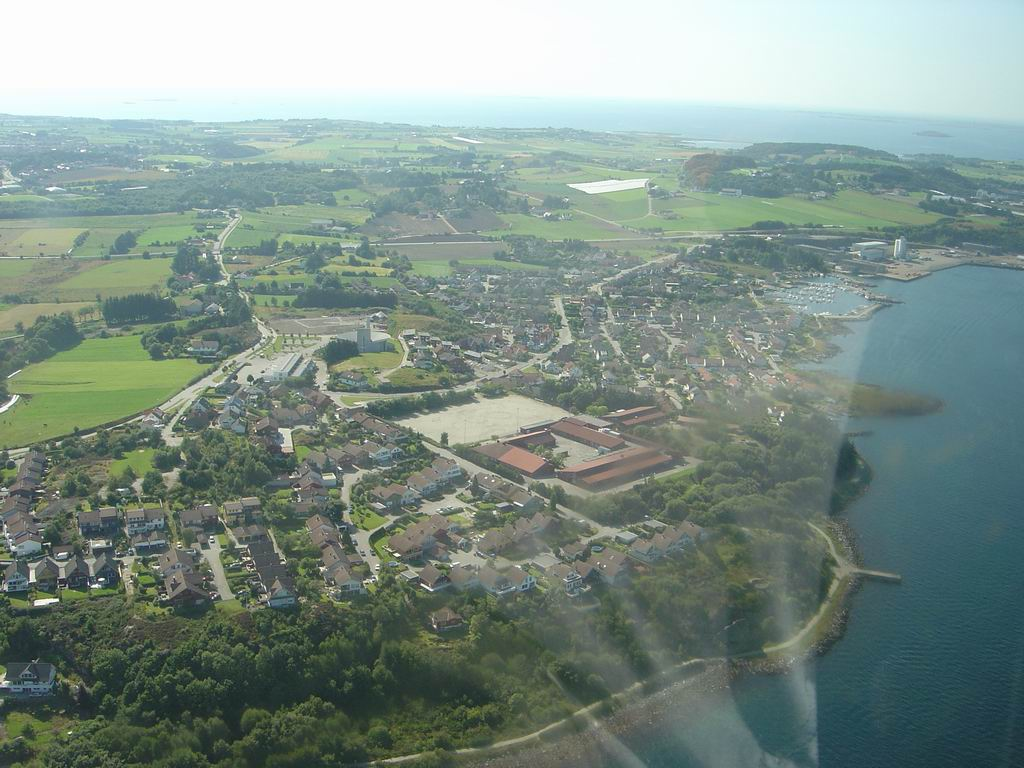
- View of the Grødem area

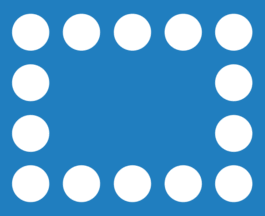
- Flag Coat of arms

- Rogaland within Norway

- Randaberg within Rogaland
- Coordinates: 59°00′06″N 05°36′55″E
- Country: Norway
- County: Rogaland
- District: Jæren
- Established: 1 July 1922
  - Preceded by: Hetland Municipality
- Administrative centre: Randaberg

Government
  - Mayor (2019): Jarle Bø (Sp)

Area
  - Total: 24.72 km^{2} (9.54 sq mi)
  - Land: 24.13 km^{2} (9.32 sq mi)
  - Water: 0.59 km^{2} (0.23 sq mi) 2.4%
  - Rank: #351 in Norway
- Highest elevation: 75.18 m (246.7 ft)

Population (2026)
  - Total: 11,841
  - Rank: #98 in Norway
  - Density: 479/km^{2} (1,240/sq mi)
  - Change (10 years): ▲ +10.3%
- Demonym: Randabergsbu

Official language
  - Norwegian form: Neutral
- Time zone: UTC+01:00 (CET)
  - Summer (DST): UTC+02:00 (CEST)
- ISO 3166 code: NO-1127
- Website: Official website

Randaberg is a municipality in Rogaland county, Norway. It is located in the traditional district of Jæren, at the northern end of the Stavanger Peninsula. The administrative centre of the municipality is the village of Randaberg. The other main village area in the municipality is Grødem.

Randaberg Municipality is located just north of the city of Stavanger. It is the northernmost conurbation of the Stavanger/Sandnes area, one of the largest urban areas in the country. The Byfjord Tunnel connects the islands of Stavanger Municipality to the east with the mainland of Randaberg Municipality. The Rogfast tunnel currently being built from Randaberg, under the Boknafjorden, to Bokn Municipality on the north side of the fjord as well as to the island of Kvitsøy.

The 24.72-square-kilometre (9.54 sq mi) municipality is the 351st largest by area out of the 357 municipalities in Norway. Randaberg Municipality is the 98th most populous municipality in Norway with a population of 11,841. The municipality's population density is 479 inhabitants per square kilometre (1,240/sq mi) and its population has increased by 10.3% over the previous 10-year period.

There was also a church located in Kongleveien 5B

== General information ==
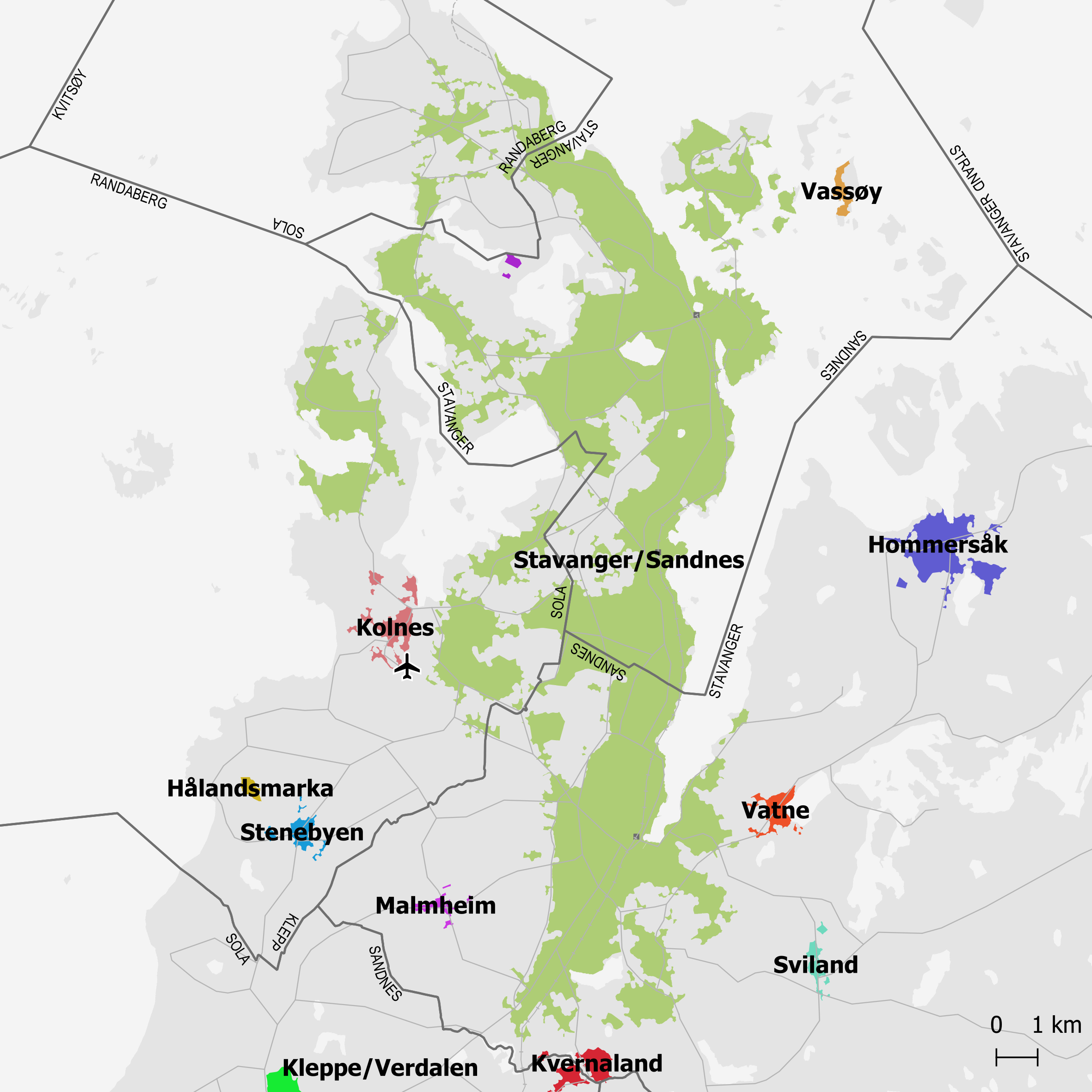
Randaberg and the Stavanger/Sandnes urban area

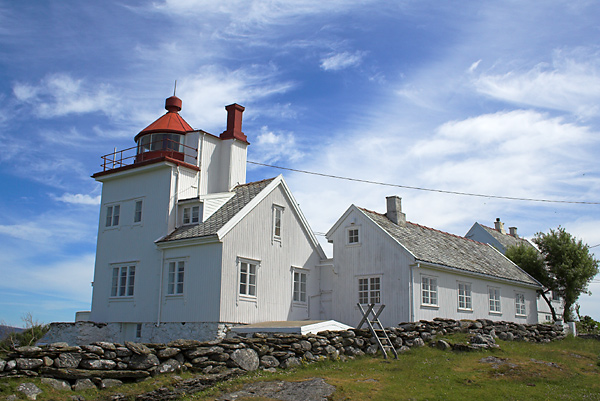
View of the Tungenes Lighthouse in Randaberg

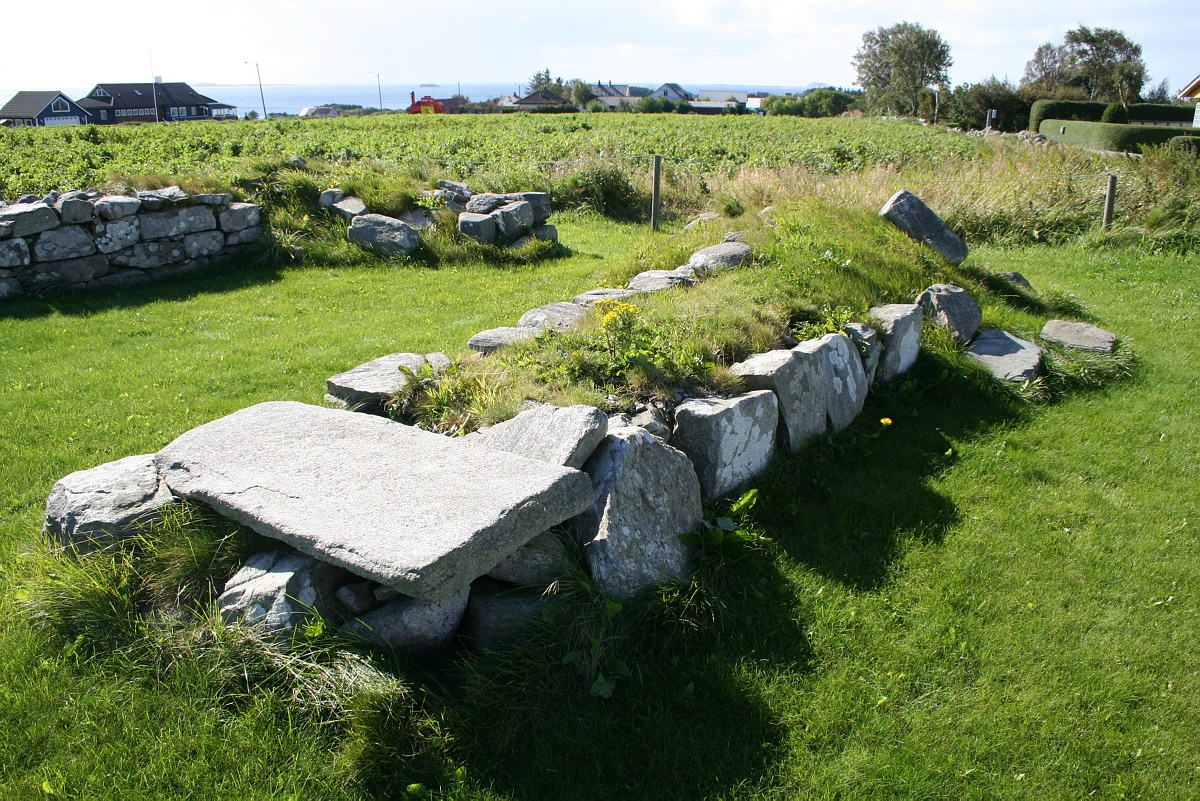
Medieval Randaberg Church ruins

The parish of Randaberg was established as a municipality on 1 July 1922 when it was separated from the large Hetland Municipality. Initially, there were 1,256 residents of the new municipality. The municipal borders have not changed since that time.

=== Name ===
The municipality (originally the parish) is named after the old Randaberg farm (Old Norse: Randarberg) since the first Randaberg Church was built there. The first element is the plural genitive case of rǫnd which means "edge" or "rim". The last element is berg which means "mountain", "rock" or "cliff". Before the early 1900s, the area was known as Randeberg.

=== Coat of arms ===
The coat of arms was granted on 26 June 1981. The official blazon is "Azure, fourteen plates in orle" (Norwegian: I blått 14 sølv mynter langs randen). This means the arms have a blue field (background) and the charge is a set of fourteen circles that outline the shield. The charge has a tincture of argent which means it is commonly colored white, but if it is made out of metal, then silver is used. The circles are meant to symbolize silver coins. The arms are partly canting since the name of the municipality is derived from a word that means "edge" and the coins are placed around edge of the shield. The coins symbolize the ball-shaped stones found in large amounts on the beach in Randaberg. The arms were designed by Truls Nygaard who based it off a preliminary design by Magnus Hardeland. The municipal flag is rectangular and has the same design as the coat of arms.

=== Churches ===
The Church of Norway has one parish (sokn) within Randaberg Municipality. It is part of the Tungenes prosti (deanery) in the Diocese of Stavanger.

Churches in Randaberg Municipality
Parish (sokn)	Church name	Location of the church	Year built
Randaberg	Randaberg Church	Randaberg	1845
Randaberg	Grødem Church	Grødem	2000

== Economy ==
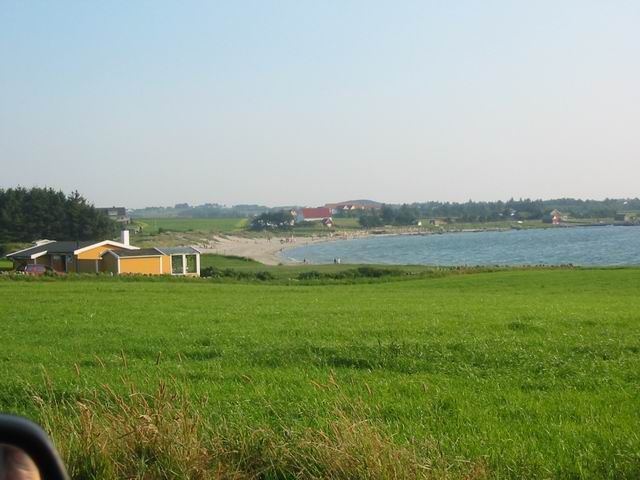
View of Sandestraen

Randaberg is still an active agricultural community, and produces over 80% of Norway's parsley. About 60% of the land is arable, and about 2% of the inhabitants are engaged in agriculture. Dairy production, chickens, and pigs are important industries. Only Klepp Municipality surpasses Randaberg Municipality in agricultural production in Rogaland county. The first potatoes every year are grown in Randaberg and are given to the Royal Family of Norway. However, due to its close proximity to the large city of Stavanger, the area is becoming more urban. There are three main suburbs of Stavanger where most of Randaberg's residents live: Randaberg village, Viste/Goa, and Grødem.

== History ==
Some of the first inhabitants of Norway settled here, and it is believed that the first people came here around 12,000 years ago. It is thought that Svarthola (local name: Vistehålå) was the main shelter for a group of 25 persons, from around 6000 BC. These people were mainly gatherers and hunters, but from around 4000 BC they also started farming. From around 2000 BC, their main activity was farming.

== Population ==
Historical population
Year	1922	1930	1946	1951	1960	1970	1980	1990	2000	2010	2020	2025
Pop.	1,256	1,465	1,945	2,116	2,726	4,533	6,002	7,561	8,773	9,997	11,053	11,795
±% p.a.	—	+1.94%	+1.79%	+1.70%	+2.85%	+5.22%	+2.85%	+2.34%	+1.50%	+1.31%	+1.01%	+1.31%
Source: Statistics Norway and Norwegian Historical Data Centre

== Government ==
Randaberg Municipality is responsible for primary education (through 10th grade), outpatient health services, senior citizen services, welfare and other social services, zoning, economic development, and municipal roads and utilities. The municipality is governed by a municipal council of directly elected representatives. The mayor is indirectly elected by a vote of the municipal council. The municipality is under the jurisdiction of the Sør-Rogaland District Court and the Gulating Court of Appeal.

=== Municipal council ===
The municipal council (Kommunestyre) of Randaberg Municipality is made up of 27 representatives that are elected to four-year terms. The tables below show the current and historical composition of the council by political party.

Randaberg kommunestyre 2023–2027
Party name (in Norwegian)	Number of representatives
Labour Party (Arbeiderpartiet)	4
Progress Party (Fremskrittspartiet)	4
Conservative Party (Høyre)	6
Industry and Business Party (Industri‑ og Næringspartiet)	1
Christian Democratic Party (Kristelig Folkeparti)	3
Centre Party (Senterpartiet)	6
Socialist Left Party (Sosialistisk Venstreparti)	1
Liberal Party (Venstre)	2
Total number of members:	27

Randaberg kommunestyre 2019–2023
Party name (in Norwegian)	Number of representatives
Labour Party (Arbeiderpartiet)	7
Progress Party (Fremskrittspartiet)	4
Green Party (Miljøpartiet De Grønne)	1
Conservative Party (Høyre)	6
Christian Democratic Party (Kristelig Folkeparti)	3
Centre Party (Senterpartiet)	4
Socialist Left Party (Sosialistisk Venstreparti)	1
Liberal Party (Venstre)	1
Total number of members:	27

Randaberg kommunestyre 2015–2019
Party name (in Norwegian)	Number of representatives
Labour Party (Arbeiderpartiet)	8
Progress Party (Fremskrittspartiet)	3
Green Party (Miljøpartiet De Grønne)	1
Conservative Party (Høyre)	7
Christian Democratic Party (Kristelig Folkeparti)	4
Centre Party (Senterpartiet)	3
Liberal Party (Venstre)	1
Total number of members:	27

Randaberg kommunestyre 2011–2015
Party name (in Norwegian)	Number of representatives
Labour Party (Arbeiderpartiet)	7
Progress Party (Fremskrittspartiet)	3
Conservative Party (Høyre)	8
Christian Democratic Party (Kristelig Folkeparti)	4
Centre Party (Senterpartiet)	2
Liberal Party (Venstre)	1
Total number of members:	25

Randaberg kommunestyre 2007–2011
Party name (in Norwegian)	Number of representatives
Labour Party (Arbeiderpartiet)	9
Progress Party (Fremskrittspartiet)	5
Conservative Party (Høyre)	4
Christian Democratic Party (Kristelig Folkeparti)	4
Centre Party (Senterpartiet)	2
Liberal Party (Venstre)	1
Total number of members:	25

Randaberg kommunestyre 2003–2007
Party name (in Norwegian)	Number of representatives
Labour Party (Arbeiderpartiet)	9
Progress Party (Fremskrittspartiet)	4
Conservative Party (Høyre)	3
Christian Democratic Party (Kristelig Folkeparti)	4
Centre Party (Senterpartiet)	2
Socialist Left Party (Sosialistisk Venstreparti)	2
Liberal Party (Venstre)	1
Total number of members:	25

Randaberg kommunestyre 1999–2003
Party name (in Norwegian)	Number of representatives
Labour Party (Arbeiderpartiet)	6
Progress Party (Fremskrittspartiet)	4
Conservative Party (Høyre)	4
Christian Democratic Party (Kristelig Folkeparti)	5
Centre Party (Senterpartiet)	4
Liberal Party (Venstre)	2
Total number of members:	25

Randaberg kommunestyre 1995–1999
Party name (in Norwegian)	Number of representatives
Labour Party (Arbeiderpartiet)	6
Progress Party (Fremskrittspartiet)	4
Conservative Party (Høyre)	5
Christian Democratic Party (Kristelig Folkeparti)	4
Centre Party (Senterpartiet)	5
Liberal Party (Venstre)	1
Total number of members:	25

Randaberg kommunestyre 1991–1995
Party name (in Norwegian)	Number of representatives
Labour Party (Arbeiderpartiet)	6
Progress Party (Fremskrittspartiet)	2
Conservative Party (Høyre)	7
Christian Democratic Party (Kristelig Folkeparti)	4
Centre Party (Senterpartiet)	5
Liberal Party (Venstre)	1
Total number of members:	25

Randaberg kommunestyre 1987–1991
Party name (in Norwegian)	Number of representatives
Labour Party (Arbeiderpartiet)	6
Conservative Party (Høyre)	9
Christian Democratic Party (Kristelig Folkeparti)	4
Centre Party (Senterpartiet)	4
Liberal Party (Venstre)	2
Total number of members:	25

Randaberg kommunestyre 1983–1987
Party name (in Norwegian)	Number of representatives
Labour Party (Arbeiderpartiet)	6
Conservative Party (Høyre)	8
Christian Democratic Party (Kristelig Folkeparti)	5
Centre Party (Senterpartiet)	5
Liberal Party (Venstre)	1
Total number of members:	25

Randaberg kommunestyre 1979–1983
Party name (in Norwegian)	Number of representatives
Labour Party (Arbeiderpartiet)	6
Conservative Party (Høyre)	8
Christian Democratic Party (Kristelig Folkeparti)	6
Centre Party (Senterpartiet)	5
Total number of members:	25

Randaberg kommunestyre 1975–1979
Party name (in Norwegian)	Number of representatives
Labour Party (Arbeiderpartiet)	6
Conservative Party (Høyre)	5
Christian Democratic Party (Kristelig Folkeparti)	7
Centre Party (Senterpartiet)	7
Total number of members:	25

Randaberg kommunestyre 1971–1975
Party name (in Norwegian)	Number of representatives
Labour Party (Arbeiderpartiet)	7
Conservative Party (Høyre)	3
Christian Democratic Party (Kristelig Folkeparti)	6
Centre Party (Senterpartiet)	7
Liberal Party (Venstre)	2
Total number of members:	25

Randaberg kommunestyre 1967–1971
Party name (in Norwegian)	Number of representatives
Labour Party (Arbeiderpartiet)	6
Conservative Party (Høyre)	2
Christian Democratic Party (Kristelig Folkeparti)	5
Centre Party (Senterpartiet)	5
Liberal Party (Venstre)	3
Total number of members:	21

Randaberg kommunestyre 1963–1967
Party name (in Norwegian)	Number of representatives
Labour Party (Arbeiderpartiet)	5
Christian Democratic Party (Kristelig Folkeparti)	5
Centre Party (Senterpartiet)	6
Local List(s) (Lokale lister)	1
Total number of members:	17

Randaberg herredsstyre 1959–1963
Party name (in Norwegian)	Number of representatives
Labour Party (Arbeiderpartiet)	4
Christian Democratic Party (Kristelig Folkeparti)	5
Centre Party (Senterpartiet)	6
Local List(s) (Lokale lister)	2
Total number of members:	17

Randaberg herredsstyre 1955–1959
Party name (in Norwegian)	Number of representatives
Labour Party (Arbeiderpartiet)	4
Christian Democratic Party (Kristelig Folkeparti)	6
Farmers' Party (Bondepartiet)	7
Total number of members:	17

Randaberg herredsstyre 1951–1955
Party name (in Norwegian)	Number of representatives
Labour Party (Arbeiderpartiet)	3
Farmers' Party (Bondepartiet)	5
Local List(s) (Lokale lister)	4
Total number of members:	12

Randaberg herredsstyre 1947–1951
Party name (in Norwegian)	Number of representatives
Labour Party (Arbeiderpartiet)	2
Joint List(s) of Non-Socialist Parties (Borgerlige Felleslister)	7
Local List(s) (Lokale lister)	3
Total number of members:	12

Randaberg herredsstyre 1945–1947
Party name (in Norwegian)	Number of representatives
Labour Party (Arbeiderpartiet)	2
Local List(s) (Lokale lister)	10
Total number of members:	12

Randaberg herredsstyre 1937–1941*
Party name (in Norwegian)	Number of representatives
Joint List(s) of Non-Socialist Parties (Borgerlige Felleslister)	2
Local List(s) (Lokale lister)	10
Total number of members:	12
Note: Due to the German occupation of Norway during World War II, no elections were held for new municipal councils until after the war ended in 1945.

=== Mayors ===
The mayor (Norwegian: ordfører) of Randaberg Municipality is the political leader of the municipality and the chairperson of the municipal council. The following people have held this position:

- 1922–1937: Andreas Harestad (Bp)
- 1938–1940: Rasmus T. Viste (Bp)
- 1945–1947: Rasmus T. Viste (Bp)
- 1956–1959: Andreas A. Vistnes (Bp)
- 1960–1963: Andreas H. Bø (Sp)
- 1964–1967: Kristen Viste Bø (Sp)
- 1968–1973: Berge Harestad (Sp)
- 1974–1975: Kristian Nybø (KrF)
- 1976–1979: Hans Edvard Bø (Sp)
- 1980–1981: Berit Brunvand (H)
- 1982–1985: Knut Bø Sande (KrF)
- 1986–1989: Oddvin Mørch Rogstad (H)
- 1990–1993: Kari Austenå (Ap)
- 1994–1999: Olav Sande (Sp)
- 1999–2007: Tom Tvedt (Ap)
- 2007–2011: Tone Tvedt Nybø (KrF)
- 2011–2015: Bjørn Christian Kahrs (H)
- 2015–2019: Kristine Enger (Ap)
- 2019–present: Jarle Bø (Sp)

== Geography ==
Randaberg Municipality is located on the northern end of the Stavanger Peninsula. The highest point in the municipality is the 75.18-metre (246.7 ft) tall mountain Signalhaugen. Stavanger Municipality is located to the east and south, Sola Municipality lies to the southwest, and Kvitsøy Municipality is located to the northwest on a small archipelago in the Boknafjorden.

=== Climate ===
Climate data for Randaberg
Month	Jan	Feb	Mar	Apr	May	Jun	Jul	Aug	Sep	Oct	Nov	Dec	Year
Daily mean °C (°F)	1.2 (34.2)	0.9 (33.6)	2.7 (36.9)	5.4 (41.7)	9.7 (49.5)	12.7 (54.9)	14.1 (57.4)	14.4 (57.9)	11.7 (53.1)	8.9 (48.0)	4.9 (40.8)	2.5 (36.5)	7.4 (45.3)
Average precipitation mm (inches)	93 (3.7)	67 (2.6)	80 (3.1)	53 (2.1)	67 (2.6)	75 (3.0)	90 (3.5)	113 (4.4)	154 (6.1)	149 (5.9)	139 (5.5)	115 (4.5)	1,195 (47.0)
Source: Norwegian Meteorological Institute

== Attractions ==
During the summer the beaches here are very popular, and among the finest in the area around Stavanger. This includes Sandestraen and Vistestraen. Hålandsvannet, a small lake, is also a popular place for swimming.

== Notable people ==
- Tom Tvedt (born 1968 in Randaberg), a politician and mayor of Randaberg for eight years
- Bent Høie (born 1971 in Randaberg), a politician and Minister of Health and Care Services in 2013
- Rune Holta (born 1973), a Polish speedway rider who grew up in Randaberg
