= Helleland (disambiguation) =

Helleland may refer to:

== People ==
- Linda Cathrine Hofstad Helleland (born 1977), a Norwegian politician for the Conservative Party
- Trond Helleland (born 1962), a Norwegian politician representing the Conservative Party

== Places ==
- Helleland, a village in Eigersund municipality in Rogaland county, Norway
- Helleland Municipality, a former municipality in Rogaland county, Norway
- Helleland Church, a church in Eigersund municipality in Rogaland county, Norway
- Helleland Station, a railway station in the village of Helleland in Eigersund municipality in Rogaland county, Norway
