= Vibberodden Lighthouse =

Coastal lighthouse in Norway

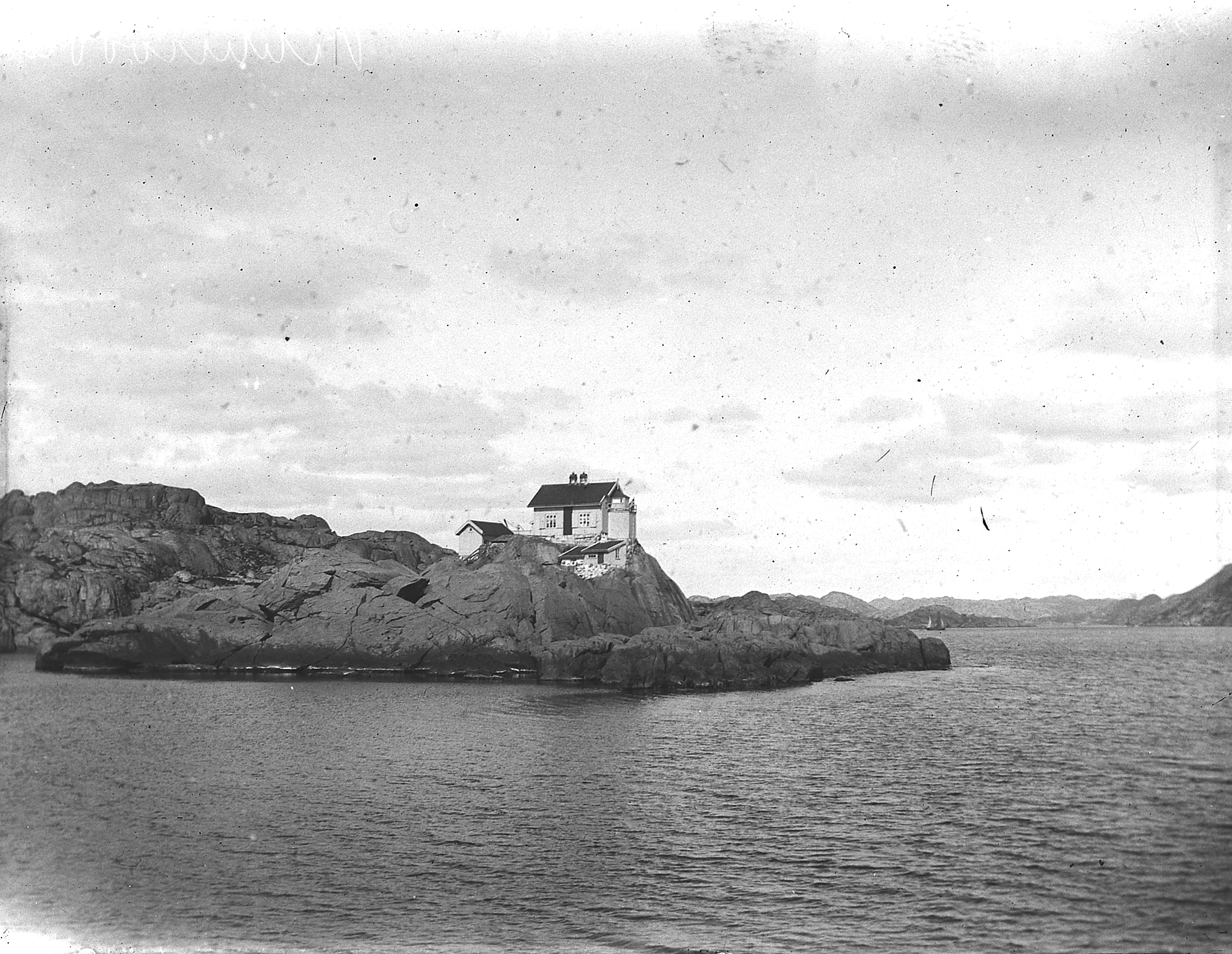
- Location: Rogaland, Norway
- Coordinates: 58°25′N 5°59′E

Tower
- Constructed: 1855
- Construction: Concrete tower
- Automated: 1977
- Height: 9.5 metres (31 ft)
- Shape: Cylindrical
- Markings: White with red top

Light
- Focal height: 22.4 metres (73 ft)
- Intensity: 4,500 candela
- Range: 14.4 nmi (26.7 km; 16.6 mi)
- Characteristic: Oc WRG 6s
- Norway no.: 093500

Vibberodden Lighthouse (Norwegian: Vibberodden fyr) is a harbour lighthouse located in Eigersund Municipality in Rogaland county, Norway. It was first lit in 1855, and automated in 1977. The lighthouse is located on the small island of Vibberodden, just southeast of the shore of the island of Eigerøya, marking the west side of the entrance to a narrow fjord leading to the town of Egersund. The lighthouse operates in coordination with Eigerøy Lighthouse and guides boats into the southern entrance to the Egersund harbour.

The current light was built in 1977, although the lighthouse station was established 1855. The light sits atop a 9.5-metre (31 ft) tall concrete post and emits its light 22 metres (72 ft) above sea level. The white, red, or green light (depending on direction) is an occulting light which flashes off once every 6 seconds at an intensity of 4,500 candela. The lighthouse is painted white and the lantern roof is painted red. The present light is located adjacent to the old lighthouse. The site is open to visitors, but the tower is closed.

== History ==
The lighthouse on Vibberodden was first established in 1855. The original lighthouse was decommissioned in 1977 when a new automated light was built right next to the old building. The old lighthouse was a 9-metre (30 ft) tall square prism-shaped wood tower. The tower is right in front of a 1-1/2 story wood lighthouse keeper's house. The building is painted white and the lantern and gallery is red. In 2006, the lighthouse was leased to a new foundation established by the Egersund Coastal Society, Nordfjord Folk Museum, and the municipality of Eigersund. The foundation has begun the historic restoration of the building, and work is continuing.

== See also ==
- List of lighthouses in Norway
- Lighthouses in Norway
