= Nodlandsvatnet =

Lake in Rogaland, Norway

- Interactive map of Nodlandsvatnet
- Location: Eigersund Municipality, Rogaland
- Coordinates: 58.4715°N 6.13631°E
- Basin countries: Norway
- Surface area: 3.95 km^{2} (1.53 sq mi)
- Water volume: 20,000,000 cubic metres (5.3×10^{9} US gal)
- Shore length^{1}: 21.5 kilometres (13.4 mi)
- Surface elevation: 138 metres (453 ft)
- References: NVE
- ^{1} Shore length is not a well-defined measure.

Nodlandsvatnet is a lake in Eigersund Municipality in Rogaland county, Norway. It is located about 8 kilometres (5.0 mi) east of the town of Egersund. The 3.95-square-kilometre (1.53 sq mi) lake is a major reservoir for the local energy company Dalane Energi, and has a capacity of 20,000,000 cubic metres (5.3×10^{9} US gal), the second largest in the area after the lake Spjodevatnet with 24,000,000 cubic metres (6.3×10^{9} US gal).

The lake also serves a recreational function. The Opplev Dalane (Explore Dalane) hiking path runs past the lake, and an open hut for hikers opened in December 2007 at Imeseid. The lake also has a sandy beach.

== See also ==
- List of lakes in Norway
