= Hestnes =

Village in Eigersund Municipality, Norway

- Village
- Interactive map of Hestnes
- Coordinates: 58.42205°N 6.01122°E
- Country: Norway
- Region: Western Norway
- County: Rogaland
- District: Dalane
- Municipality: Eigersund Municipality
- Elevation: 12 m (39 ft)
- Time zone: UTC+01:00 (CET)
  - Summer (DST): UTC+02:00 (CEST)
- Post Code: 4372 Egersund

Hestnes is a small village in Eigersund Municipality in Rogaland county, Norway. The village is on the southern edge of the town of Egersund. The population of Hestnes in 2023 was 225, but since that time it has been considered part of the Egersund urban area.

== Residential Area Development and Nature ==
Hestnes is a developing residential site that is located approximately 4 kilometres (2.5 mi) south of the town center of Egersund. It was previously considered a separate village but it is now defined as part of the town of Egersund.

The last several years have seen considerable development at Hestnes with new detached and semi-detached appearances built alongside the longstanding residential properties. Plans by the council are a mixed residential development to take place on the adjacent site at Rundevoll, and bettering local infrastructure, including kindergarten, school and bike path availability.

Although it's near urban services, it has a strong feel of nature in community life. There is a walking path very close to Hestnes that is popular among the local residents, as it opens to the North Sea, small islets, and local landscapes with forested areas and small streams and old cabin remains. It is often referenced to as one of the prettiest walkable paths in Rogaland that is close and accessible.
