= Eigerøy Church =

Church in Rogaland, Norway

- Eigerøy kyrkje
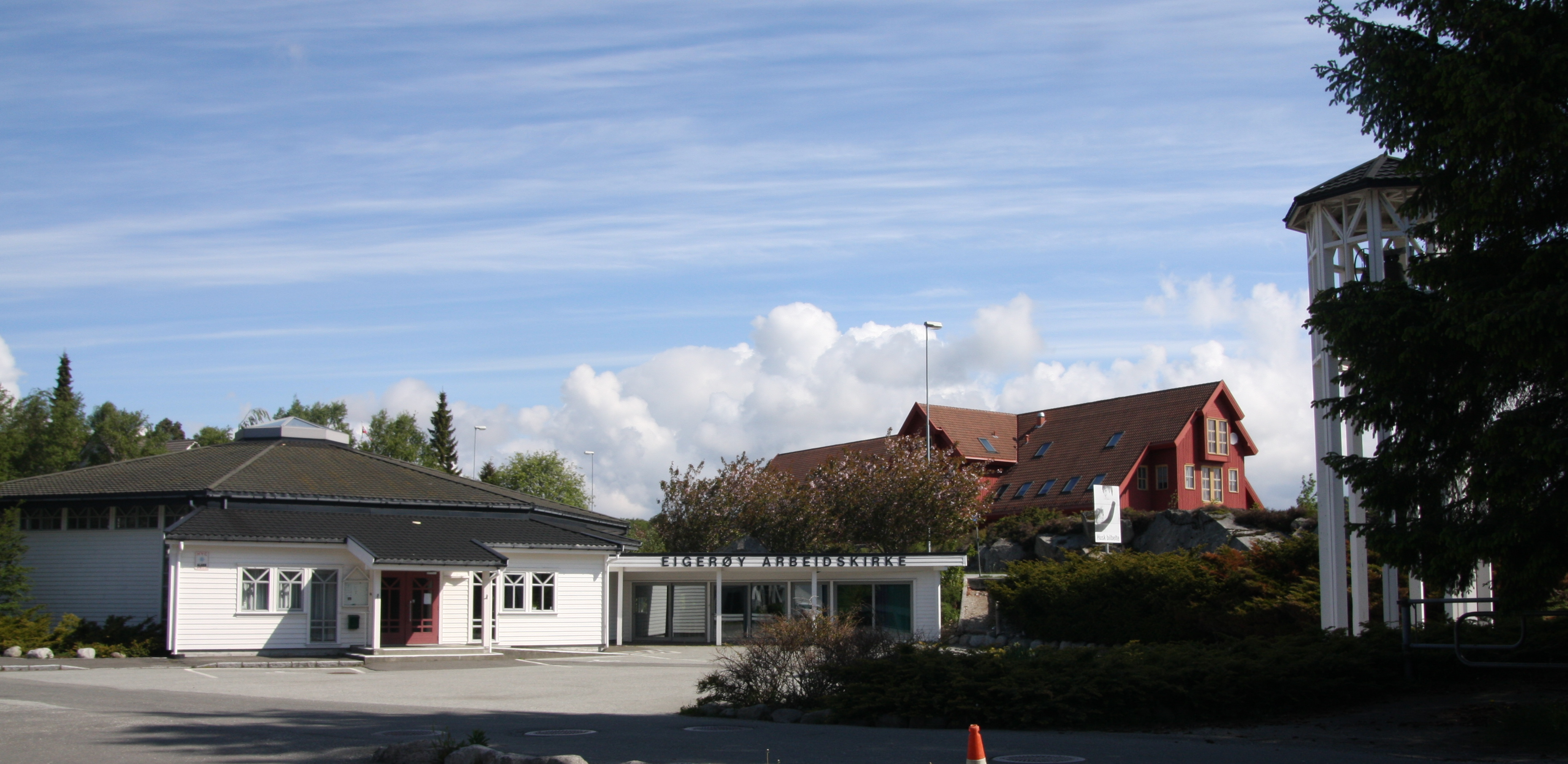
- View of the church
- Eigerøy Church
- 58.448151°N 5.976478°E
- Location: Eigersund Municipality, Rogaland
- Country: Norway
- Denomination: Church of Norway
- Churchmanship: Evangelical Lutheran

History
- Status: Parish church
- Consecrated: 30 Aug 1998

Architecture
- Functional status: Active
- Completed: 1998 (28 years ago)

Specifications
- Materials: Wood

Administration
- Diocese: Stavanger bispedømme
- Deanery: Dalane prosti
- Parish: Eigerøy

Eigerøy Church (Norwegian: Eigerøy kirke) is a parish church of the Church of Norway in Eigersund Municipality in Rogaland county, Norway. It is located on the island of Eigerøya. It is the church for the Eigerøy parish which is part of the Dalane prosti (deanery) in the Diocese of Stavanger. The white, wooden church was built in a modern style in 1998. The building was consecrated on 30 August 1998.

== See also ==
- List of churches in Rogaland
