= Bakkebø Church =

Church in Rogaland, Norway

- Bakkebø kyrkje
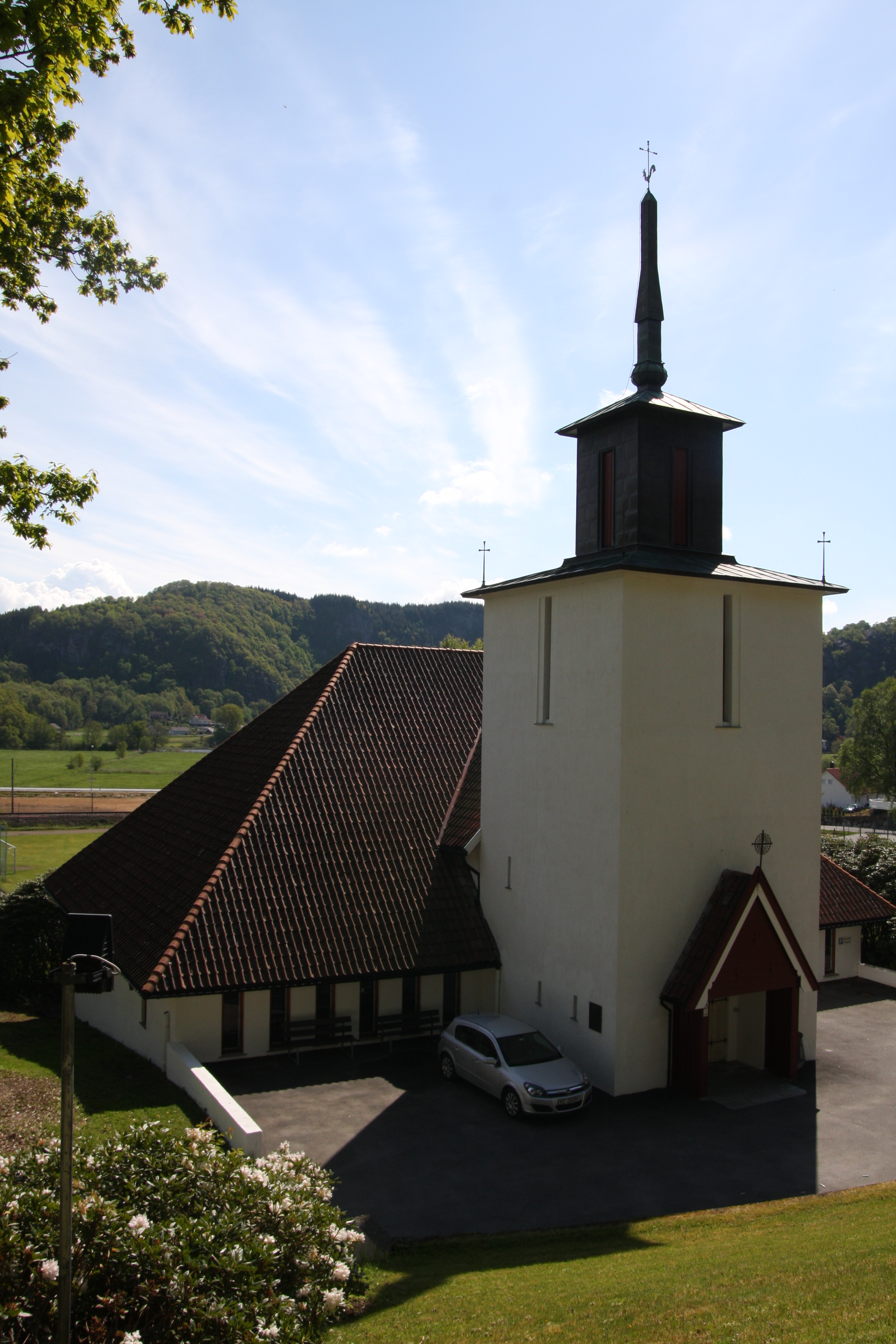
- View of the church
- Bakkebø Church
- 58.470861°N 06.022542°E
- Location: Eigersund Municipality, Rogaland
- Country: Norway
- Denomination: Church of Norway
- Churchmanship: Evangelical Lutheran

History
- Status: Parish church
- Consecrated: 29 May 1960

Architecture
- Functional status: Active
- Architect(s): Arnstein Arneberg and Olav S. Platou
- Architectural type: Rectangular
- Completed: 1960 (66 years ago)

Specifications
- Capacity: 400
- Materials: Concrete

Administration
- Diocese: Stavanger bispedømme
- Deanery: Dalane prosti
- Parish: Egersund
- Norwegian Cultural Heritage Site
- Type: Church
- Status: Not protected
- ID: 83842

Bakkebø Church (Norwegian: Bakkebø kirke) is a parish church of the Church of Norway in Eigersund Municipality in Rogaland county, Norway. It is located in the northern part of the town of Egersund. It is one of the two churches for the Egersund parish which is part of the Dalane prosti (deanery) in the Diocese of Stavanger. The white, concrete church was built in a rectangular style in 1960 using designs by the architects Arnstein Arneberg and Olav S. Platou. The church seats about 400 people. It was consecrated on 29 May 1960.

In the first years, the church had two electronic organs, and in 1974 a pipe organ was built by Jehmlich Orgelbau Dresden.

== See also ==
- List of churches in Rogaland
