= Egersund Church =

Church in Rogaland, Norway

- Egersund kyrkje
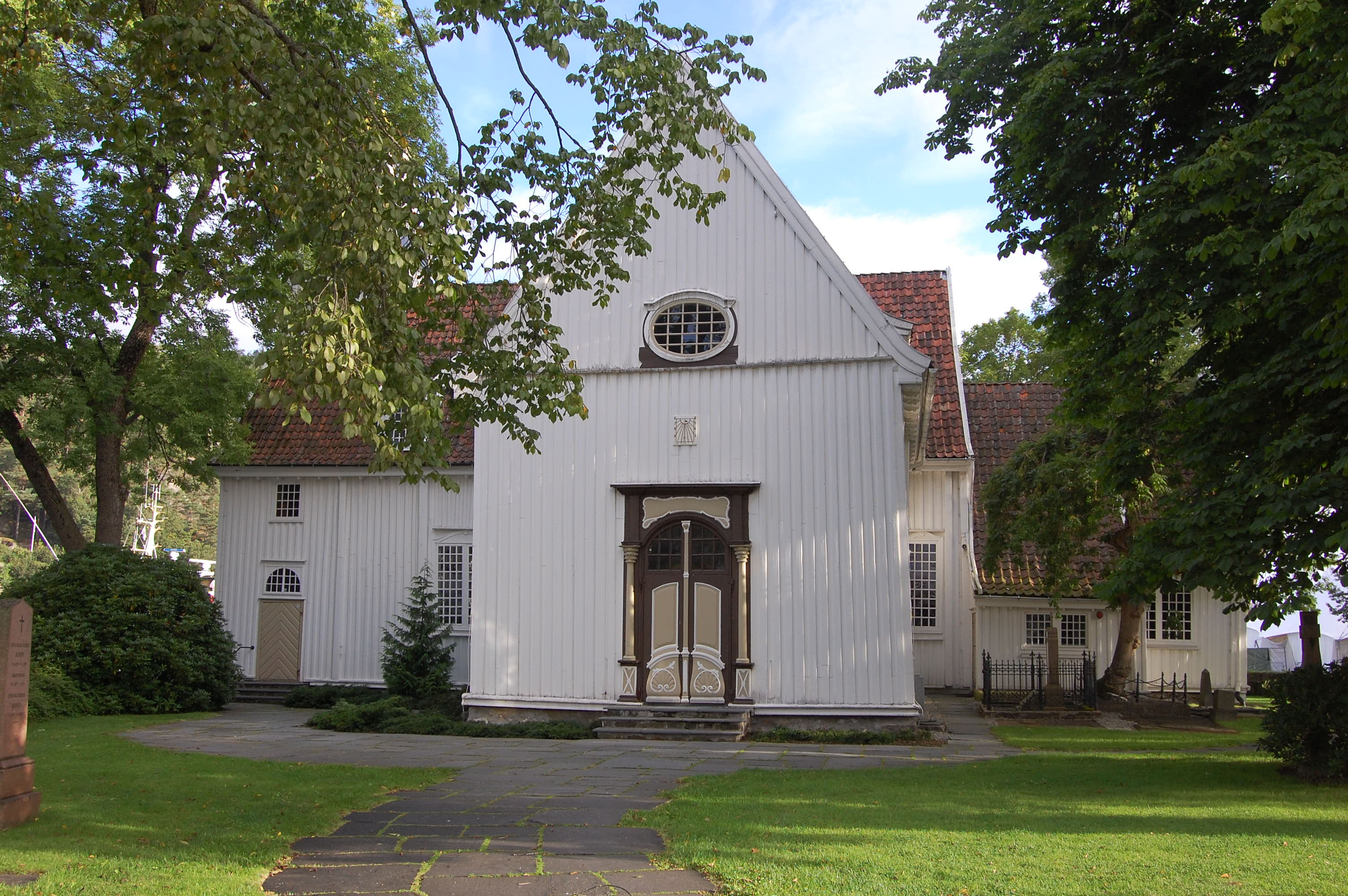
- View of the church
- Egersund Church
- 58.451907°N 05.99990°E
- Location: Eigersund Municipality, Rogaland
- Country: Norway
- Denomination: Church of Norway
- Churchmanship: Evangelical Lutheran

History
- Status: Parish church
- Founded: 11th century

Architecture
- Functional status: Active
- Architectural type: Cruciform
- Completed: c. 1623 (403 years ago)

Specifications
- Capacity: 1,090
- Materials: Wood

Administration
- Diocese: Stavanger bispedømme
- Deanery: Dalane prosti
- Parish: Egersund
- Norwegian Cultural Heritage Site
- Type: Church
- Status: Automatically protected
- ID: 84052

Egersund Church (Norwegian: Egersund kirke) is a parish church of the Church of Norway in Eigersund Municipality in Rogaland county, Norway. It is located in the centre of the town of Egersund. It is one of the two churches for the Egersund parish which is part of the Dalane prosti (deanery) in the Diocese of Stavanger. The white, wooden church was built in a cruciform style in 1623 using designs by an unknown architect. The church seats about 1,090 people.

== History ==
The earliest existing historical records of the church date back to the year 1292, but it was not new that year. The first church may have been a stave church and it was dedicated to St. Mary. In 1292, it was written about in a letter from the Pope, and it was called "Ecclesia sancte Marie de Eikundasund" (St. Mary's Church of Egersund). Its date of construction is not known, but there is historical evidence to show that a church has been on this site since possibly the 11th century AD. The church was located at Aarstad in what is now the town of Egersund, right along the harbour.

Around the year 1623 or 1624, the old church was torn down and replaced with a new timber-framed long church on the same site. The new church was situated so that the choir was on the east end of the building. During the Norwegian church auction in 1726, the church was sold by King Frederick IV to the town judge and two other local businessmen in order to pay down the debts from the Great Northern War. The church was later purchased back by the parish so it was no longer privately owned.

From 1785 to 1788, the church underwent a massive renovation and expansion project. The church was converted to a cruciform design by adding transverse arms to the north and south sides of the church. The ceilings were raised and vaulted so that tiered galleries were added around the perimeter of the church interior. This expansion greatly increased the capacity of the church and making it the second-largest church in all of Stavanger county at that time.

In 1814, this church served as an election church (Norwegian: valgkirke). Together with more than 300 other parish churches across Norway, it was a polling station for elections to the 1814 Norwegian Constituent Assembly which wrote the Constitution of Norway. This was Norway's first national elections. Each church parish was a constituency that elected people called "electors" who later met together in each county to elect the representatives for the assembly that was to meet at Eidsvoll Manor later that year.

In 1927, the church was redecorated and restored to bring it closer to its 17th century appearance.

== Media gallery ==
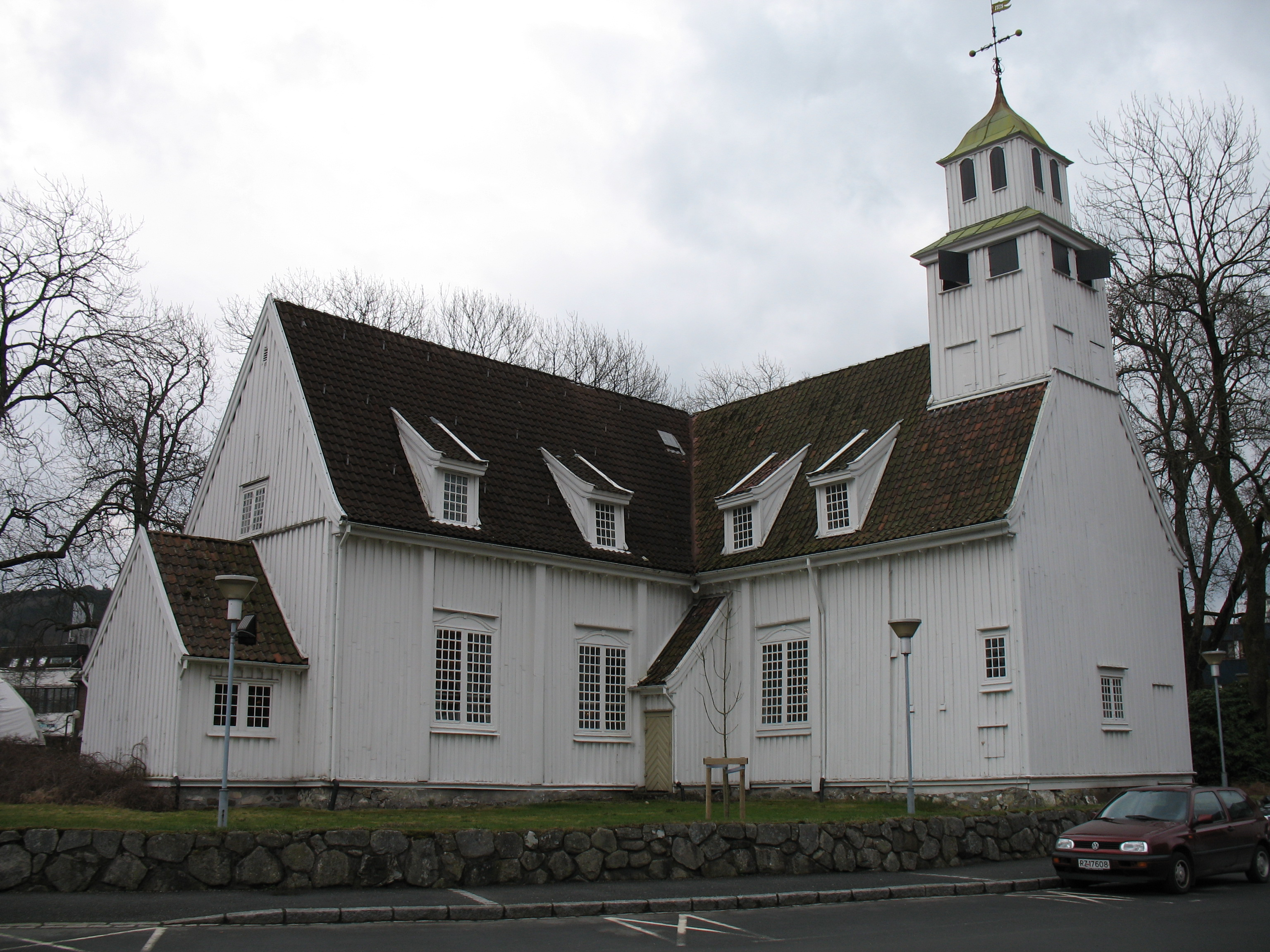

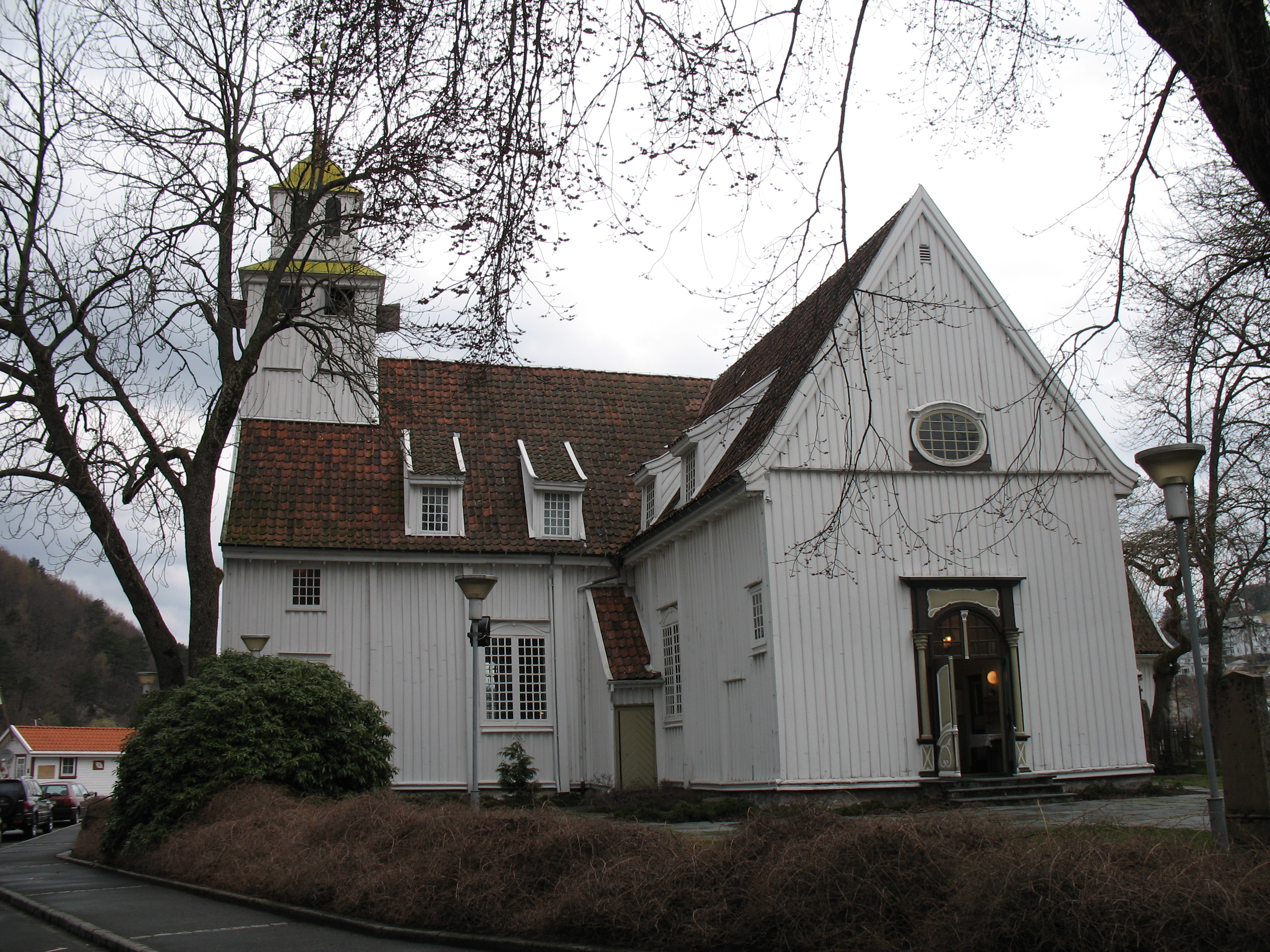

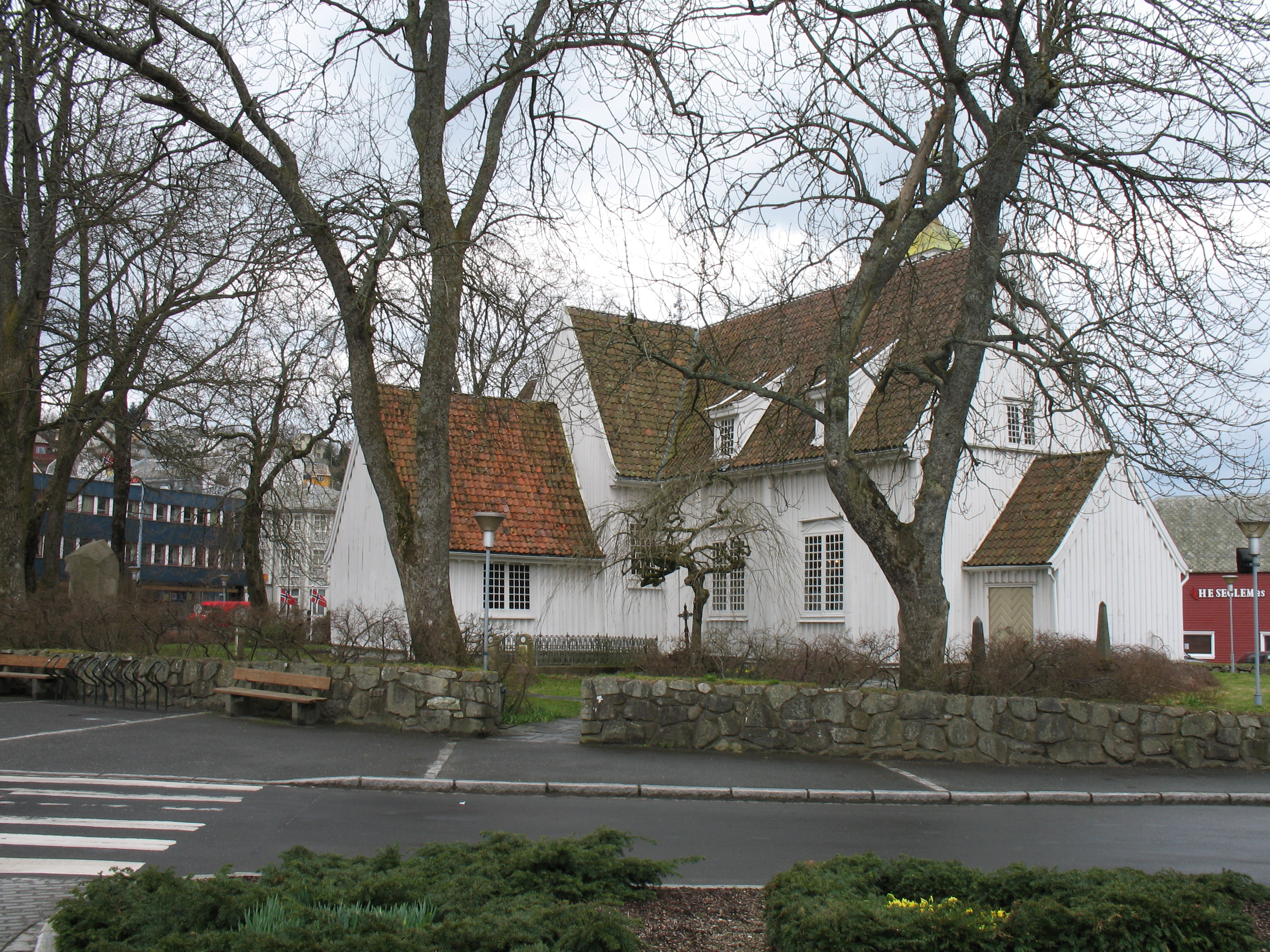

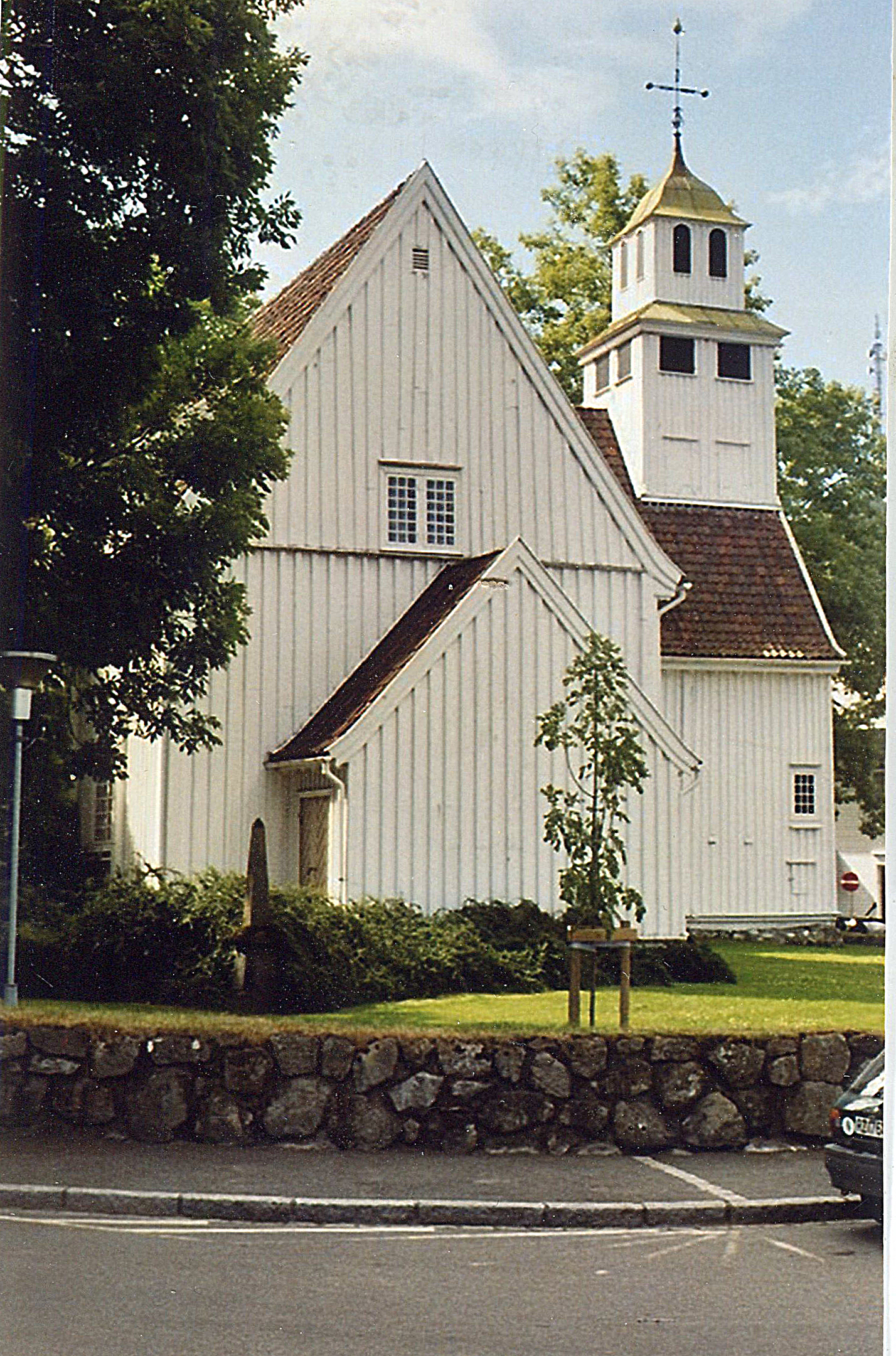

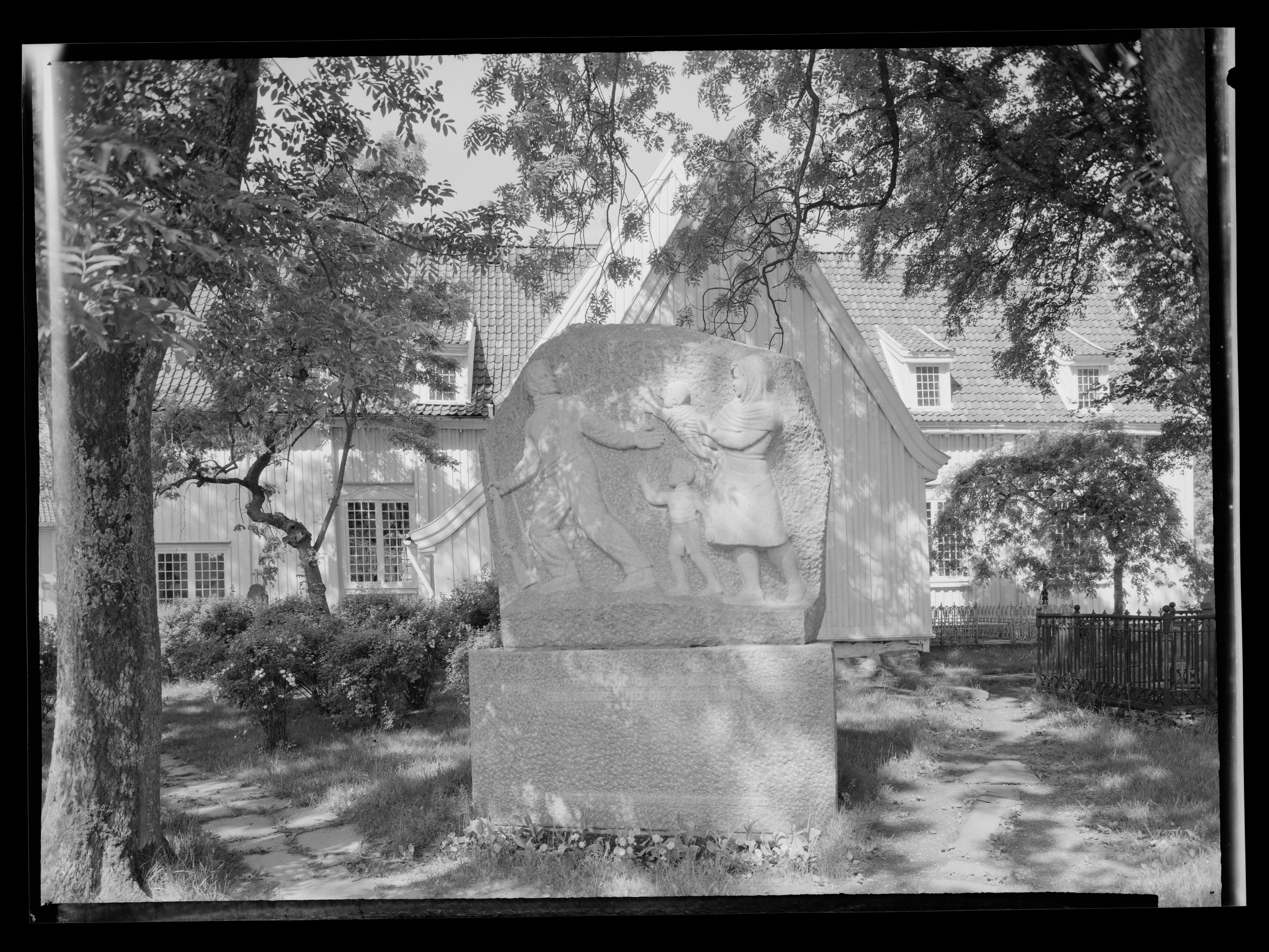

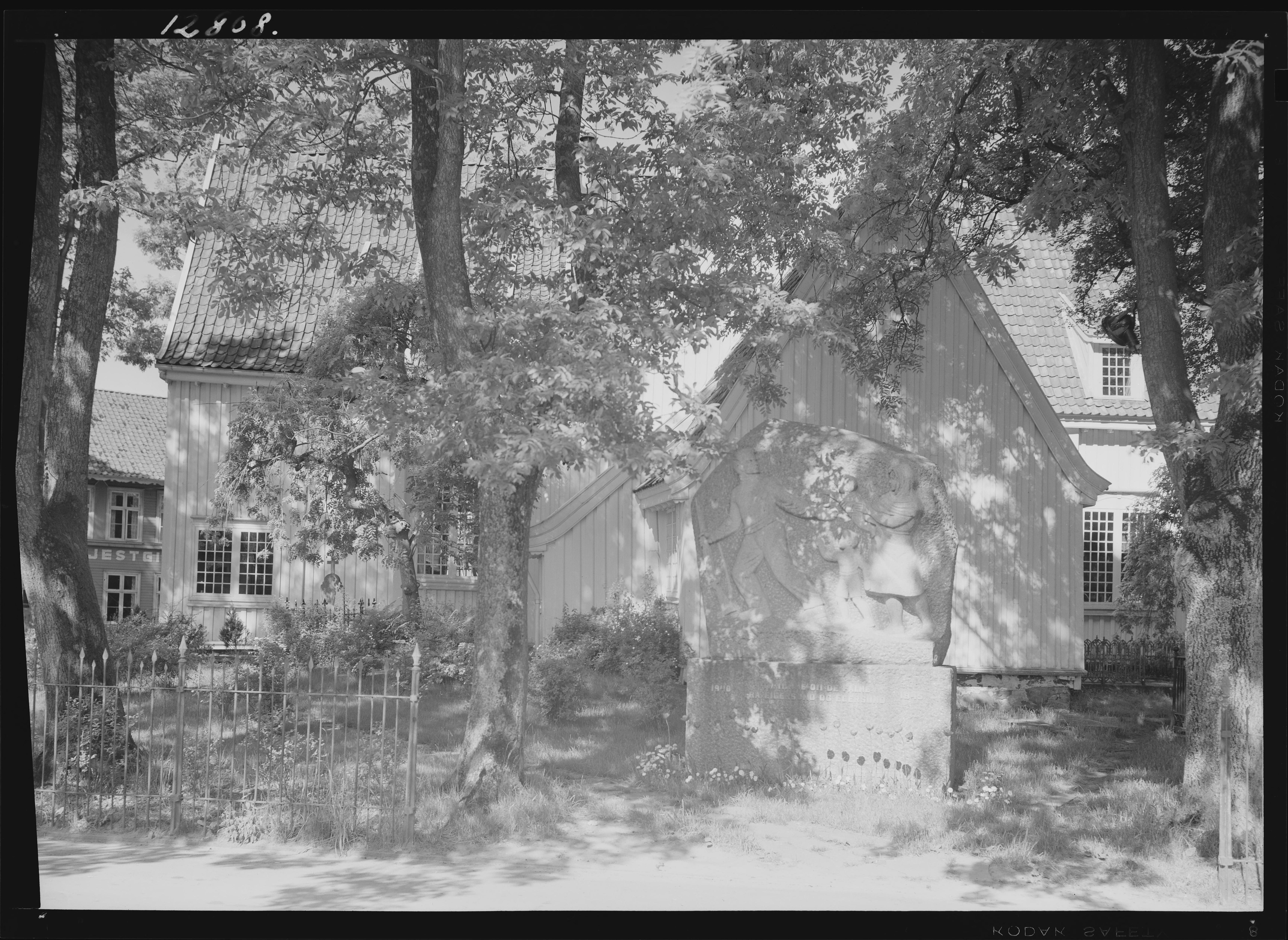

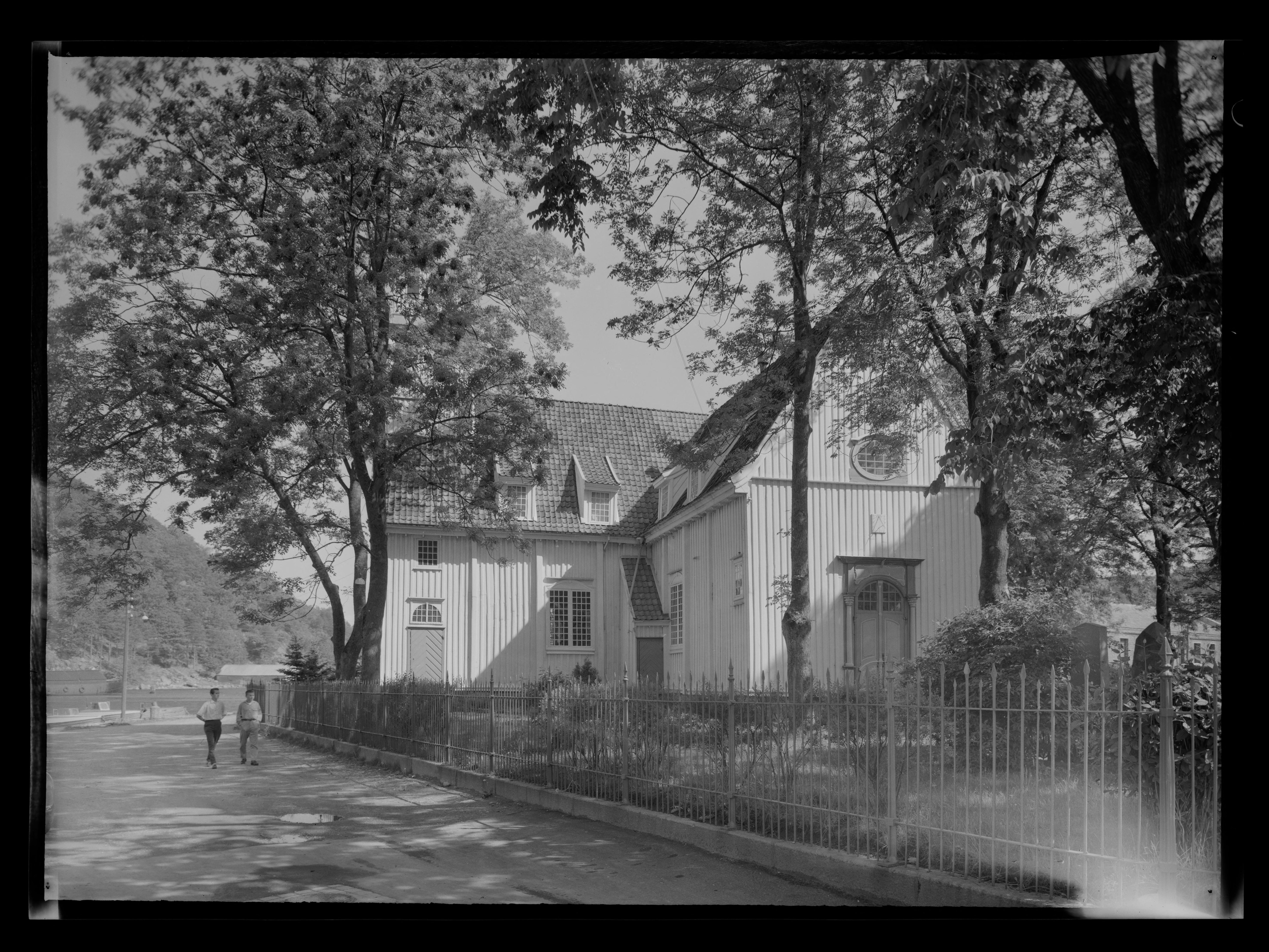

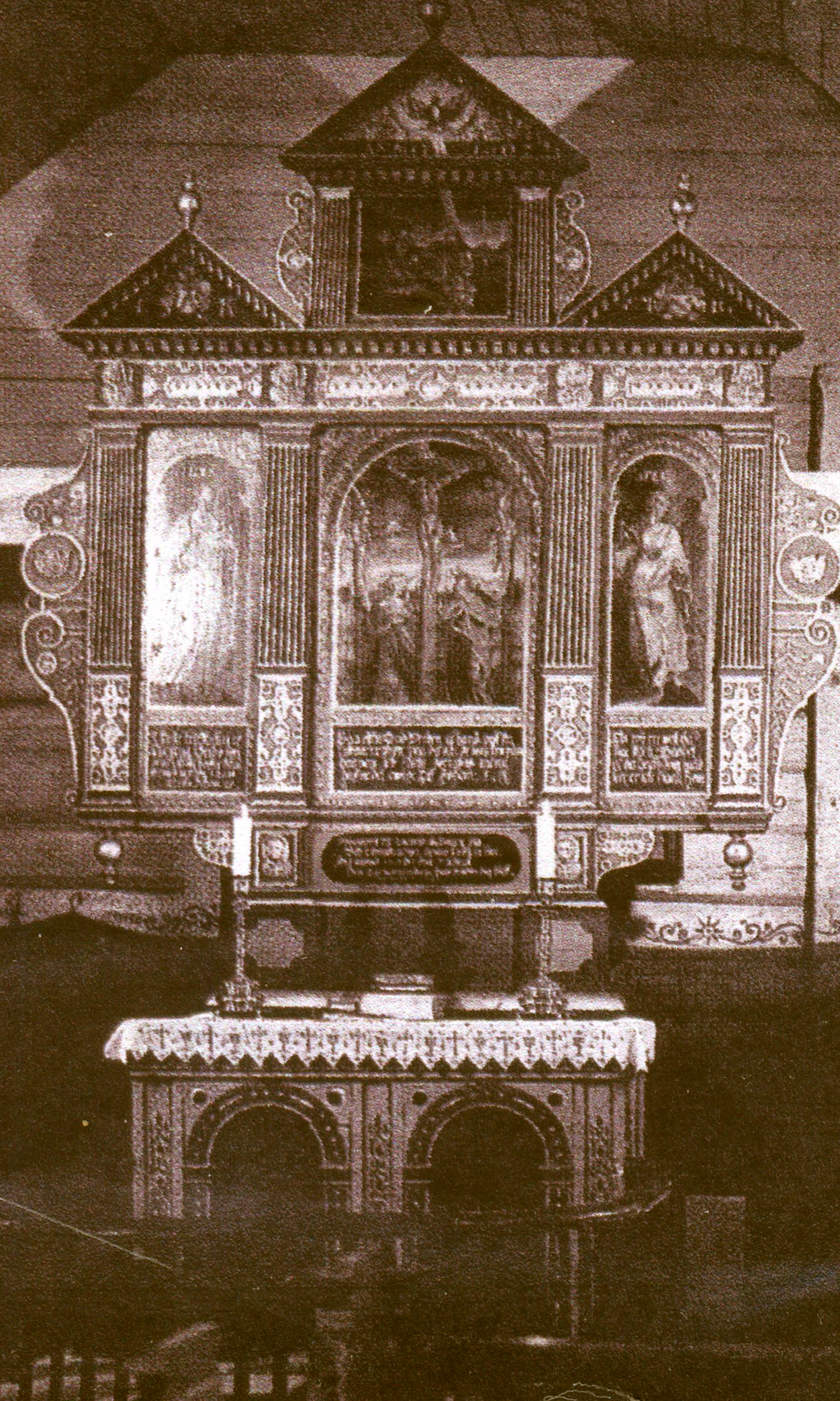

== See also ==
- List of churches in Rogaland
