= Helleland Municipality =

Former municipality in Rogaland, Norway

Helleland Municipality Helleland herred
- Former municipality
- Rogaland within Norway

- Helleland within Rogaland
- Coordinates: 58°31′14″N 06°06′57″E
- Country: Norway
- County: Rogaland
- District: Dalane
- Established: 1 Jan 1838
  - Created as: Formannskapsdistrikt
- Disestablished: 1 Jan 1965
  - Succeeded by: Eigersund Municipality
- Administrative centre: Helleland

Government
  - Mayor (1945-1965): John Munkejord

Area (upon dissolution)
  - Total: 148.2 km^{2} (57.2 sq mi)
  - Rank: #370 in Norway
- Highest elevation: 736 m (2,415 ft)

Population (1964)
  - Total: 869
  - Rank: #493 in Norway
  - Density: 5.9/km^{2} (15/sq mi)
  - Change (10 years): ▼ −10.2%

Official language
  - Norwegian form: Neutral
- Time zone: UTC+01:00 (CET)
  - Summer (DST): UTC+02:00 (CEST)
- ISO 3166 code: NO-1115

Helleland is a former municipality in Rogaland county, Norway. The 148.2-square-kilometre (57.2 sq mi) municipality existed from 1838 until its dissolution in 1965. The area is now part of Eigersund Municipality in the traditional district of Dalane. The administrative centre was the village of Helleland where the Helleland Church is located.

Prior to its dissolution in 1965, the 148.2-square-kilometre (57.2 sq mi) municipality was the 370th largest by area out of the 525 municipalities in Norway. Helleland Municipality was the 493rd most populous municipality in Norway with a population of about 869. The municipality's population density was 5.9 inhabitants per square kilometre (15/sq mi) and its population had decreased by 10.2% over the previous 10-year period.

== General information ==
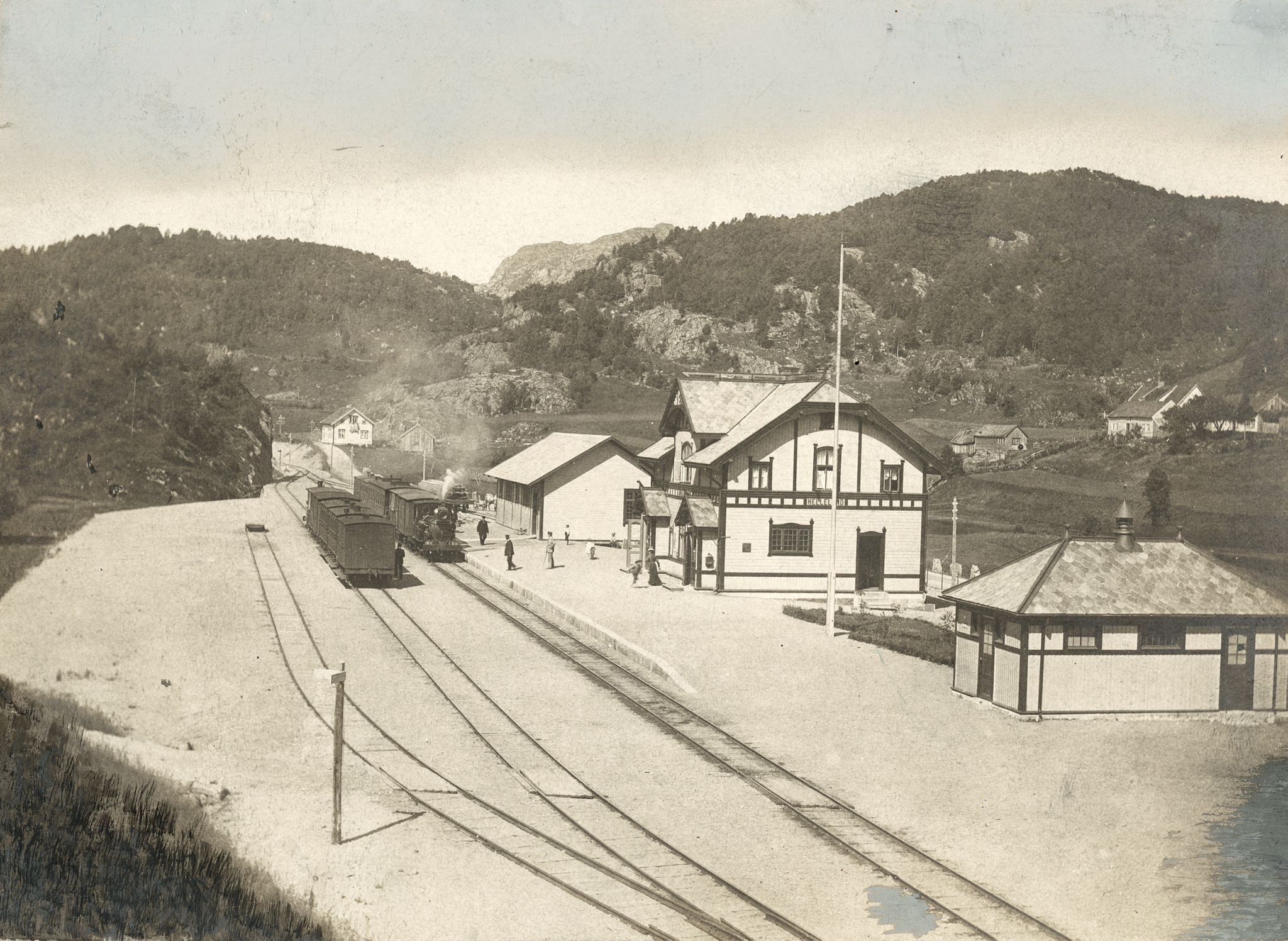
Helleland Station

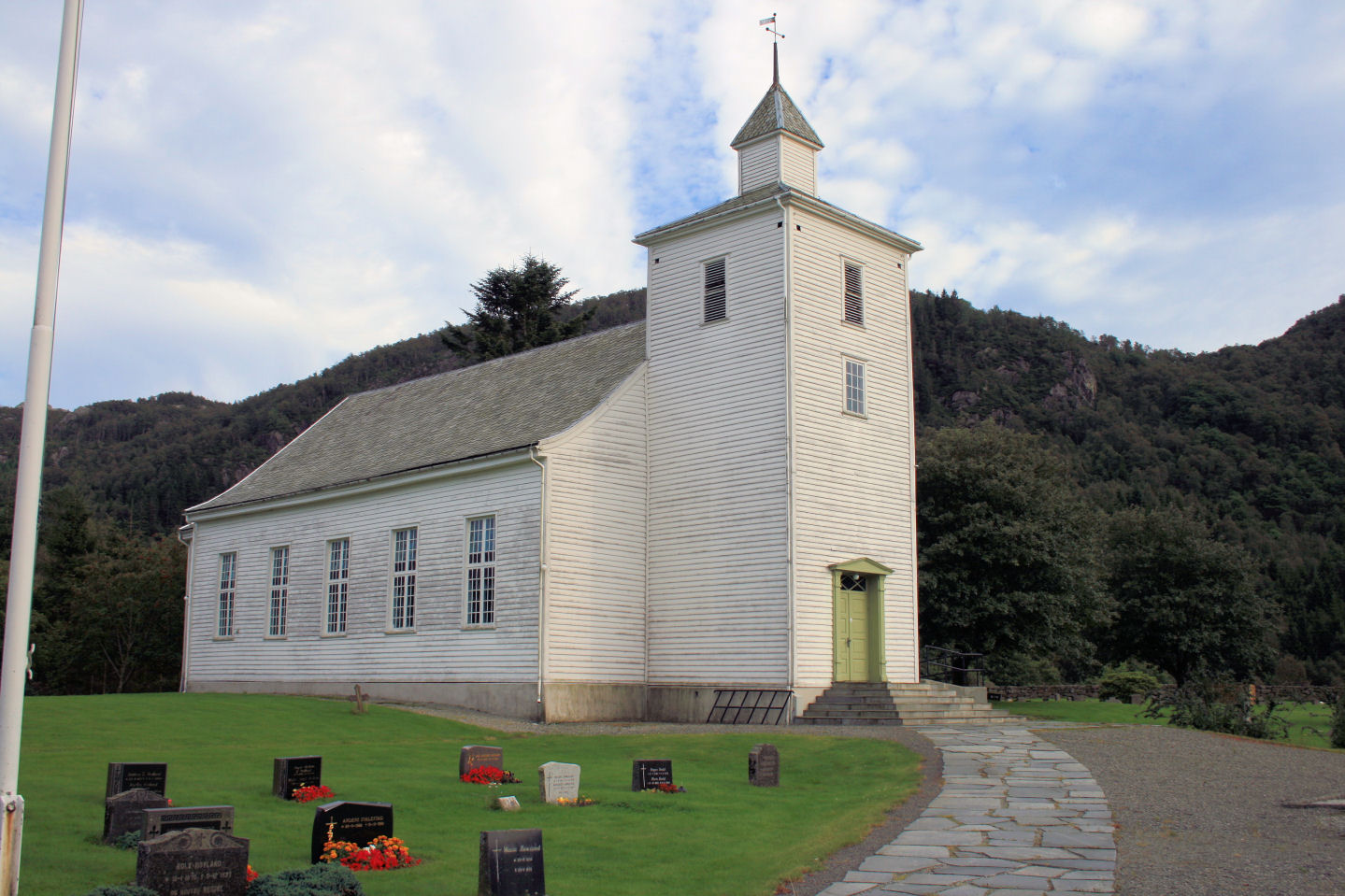
Helleland Church

The parish of Helleland was established as a municipality on 1 January 1838 (see formannskapsdistrikt law). During the 1960s, there were many municipal mergers across Norway due to the work of the Schei Committee. On 1 January 1965, Helleland Municipality was dissolved and it was merged with the following areas to form a much larger Eigersund Municipality:

- the town of Egersund (population: 3,787)
- all of Helleland Municipality (population: 851)
- all of Eigersund Municipality (population: 4,664)
- the Gyadalen and Grøsfjell areas of Heskestad Municipality (population: 114)

=== Name ===
The municipality (originally the parish) is named after the old Helleland farm (Old Norse: Helliland) since the first Helleland Church was built there. The first element comes from the dative case of hellir which means "cave" or "cavern". The last element is land which means "land" or "district".

=== Churches ===
The Church of Norway had one parish (sokn) within Helleland Municipality. At the time of the municipal dissolution, it was part of the Helleland prestegjeld and the Dalane prosti (deanery) in the Diocese of Stavanger.

Churches in Helleland Municipality
Parish (sokn)	Church name	Location of the church	Year built
Helleland	Helleland Church	Helleland	1832

== Geography ==
The municipality was located in the Dalane region to the northeast of the town of Egersund. The highest point in the municipality was the 736-metre (2,415 ft) tall mountain Rygja, located on the northeastern border with Heskestad Municipality. Bjerkreim Municipality was located to the north, Heskestad Municipality was located to the east, and Eigersund Municipality was located to the southwest.

== Government ==
While it existed, Helleland Municipality was responsible for primary education (through 10th grade), outpatient health services, senior citizen services, welfare and other social services, zoning, economic development, and municipal roads and utilities. The municipality was governed by a municipal council of directly elected representatives. The mayor was indirectly elected by a vote of the municipal council. The municipality was under the jurisdiction of the Dalane District Court and the Gulating Court of Appeal.

=== Municipal council ===
The municipal council (Herredsstyre) of Helleland Municipality was made up of 13 representatives that were elected to four year terms. The tables below show the historical composition of the council by political party.

Helleland herredsstyre 1963–1965
Party name (in Norwegian)	Number of representatives
Labour Party (Arbeiderpartiet)	2
Local List(s) (Lokale lister)	11
Total number of members:	13
Note: On 1 January 1965, Helleland Municipality became part of Eigersund Municipality.

Helleland herredsstyre 1959–1963
Party name (in Norwegian)	Number of representatives
Labour Party (Arbeiderpartiet)	1
Local List(s) (Lokale lister)	12
Total number of members:	13

Helleland herredsstyre 1955–1959
Party name (in Norwegian)	Number of representatives
Labour Party (Arbeiderpartiet)	1
Local List(s) (Lokale lister)	12
Total number of members:	13

Helleland herredsstyre 1951–1955
Party name (in Norwegian)	Number of representatives
Labour Party (Arbeiderpartiet)	2
Local List(s) (Lokale lister)	10
Total number of members:	12

Helleland herredsstyre 1947–1951
Party name (in Norwegian)	Number of representatives
Labour Party (Arbeiderpartiet)	2
Farmers' Party (Bondepartiet)	4
Local List(s) (Lokale lister)	6
Total number of members:	12

Helleland herredsstyre 1945–1947
Party name (in Norwegian)	Number of representatives
Labour Party (Arbeiderpartiet)	2
Local List(s) (Lokale lister)	10
Total number of members:	12

Helleland herredsstyre 1937–1941*
Party name (in Norwegian)	Number of representatives
List of workers, fishermen, and small farmholders (Arbeidere, fiskere, småbrukere liste)	1
Joint List(s) of Non-Socialist Parties (Borgerlige Felleslister)	11
Total number of members:	12
Note: Due to the German occupation of Norway during World War II, no elections were held for new municipal councils until after the war ended in 1945.

=== Mayors ===
The mayor (Norwegian: ordførar) of Helleland Municipality was the political leader of the municipality and the chairperson of the municipal council. The following people have held this position:

- 1838–1847: Peder Jakobsen Feed
- 1848–1859: Tønnes Tønnessen Svalestad
- 1860–1863: Peder Jakobsen Lien
- 1864–1865: Tønnes Tønnesson Svalestad
- 1866–1869: Jonas Thomassen Birkeland
- 1870–1877: Peder Jakobsen Lien
- 1878–1879: Helge Ommundsen Slettebø
- 1880–1881: Tønnes Jakobsen Gydal
- 1882–1885: Peder Jakobsen Lien
- 1886–1887: Jørgen Anton Meldal Pedersen Hogstad
- 1888–1891: Ommund Helgesen Slettebø
- 1892–1895: Peder Jakobsen Lien
- 1896–1907: Jonas Nilsen Svalestad
- 1908–1917: Theodor Torkellson Hovland (V)
- 1918–1925: Retsius Hansson Polden
- 1925–1925: Hans Rasmussen Kvassheim
- 1926–1928: Anton Emil Jonasson Birkeland
- 1929–1934: Nils Jonassen Svalestad
- 1935–1941: Retsius Hansson Polden
- 1942–1945: Tønnes Hetland (NS)
- 1945–1945: Jon Birkeland
- 1945–1965: John Munkejord

== See also ==
- List of former municipalities of Norway
