= Johan Fredrik Feyer =

Johan Fredrik Feyer (16 July 1821 – 26 June 1880) was a Norwegian industrial pioneer and factory owner.

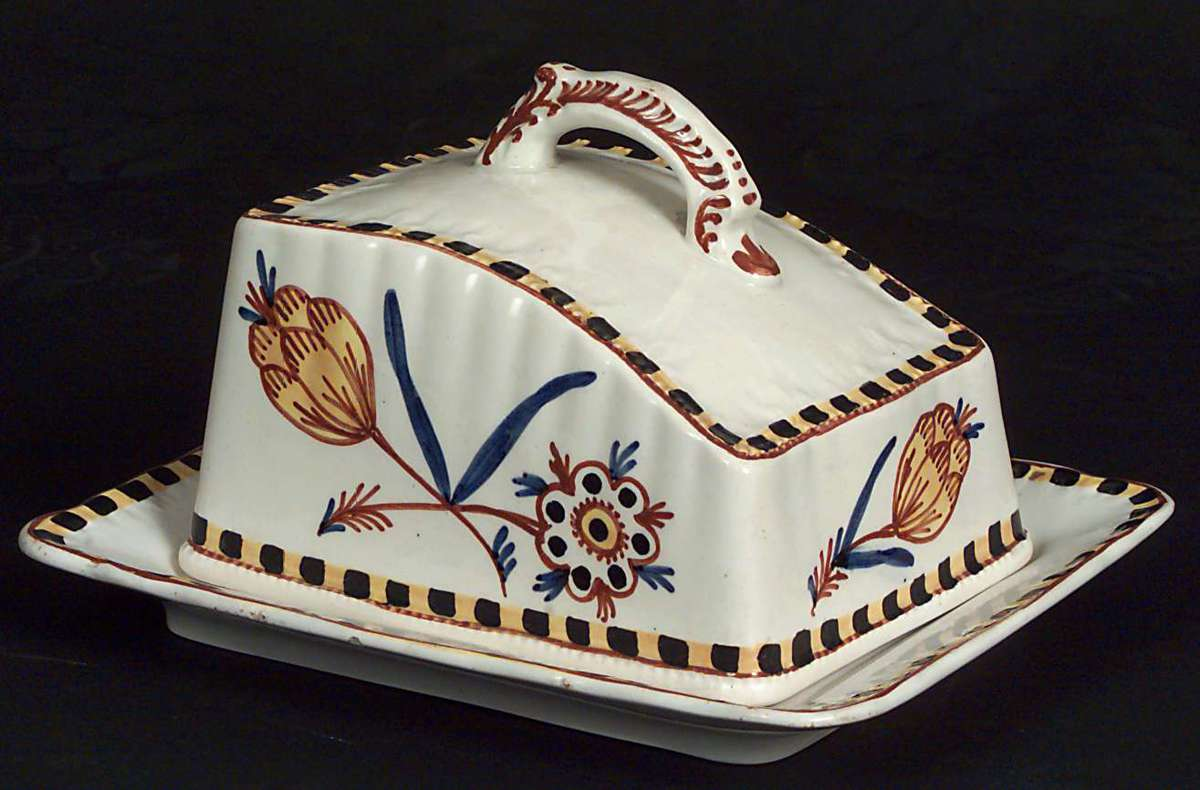
Ceramic pot from Egersunds Fayancefabrik (Norsk Folkemuseum)

He was born in Christiania (now Oslo), Norway. He was the son of Christian Feyer (1793-1879) and Helene Othilie Falck (1792-1865). His father was a state official and court administrator (sorenskriver). While he was young, his family moved to Egersund in Rogaland. He was educated by the parish priest for Nærbø and Varhaug with further education in Christiania. During the 1840s, he traveled to Great Britain to study stoneware production. In 1846 he returned to Egersund where the following year he established a pottery plant, Egersund Potteria, which became Norway's leading stoneware manufacturer during the 1850s.

From 1865 the factory was known as Egersunds Fayancefabrik, producing the fine tin-glazed pottery on earthenware known as faience. By 1876, the factory encountered a financial crisis and was administered by the courts. The estate was not insolvent and the factory continued. Feyer was offered a position which he declined. He subsequently left Egersund and settled in Christiania.
