= Olaf Aurdal =

Norwegian politician (born 1939)

Olaf Aurdal (born 14 April 1939) is a Norwegian politician for the Conservative Party.

He served as a deputy representative to the Norwegian Parliament from Rogaland during the term 1989–1993.

On the local level he was mayor of Eigersund Municipality from 1987 to 1989, deputy mayor from 1983 to 1987 and 1990 to 1991, and a long-time municipality council member. From 1987 to 1991 he was also a member of Rogaland county council.
