= Trollpikken =

Rock formation in Rogaland, Norway

- Rock formation
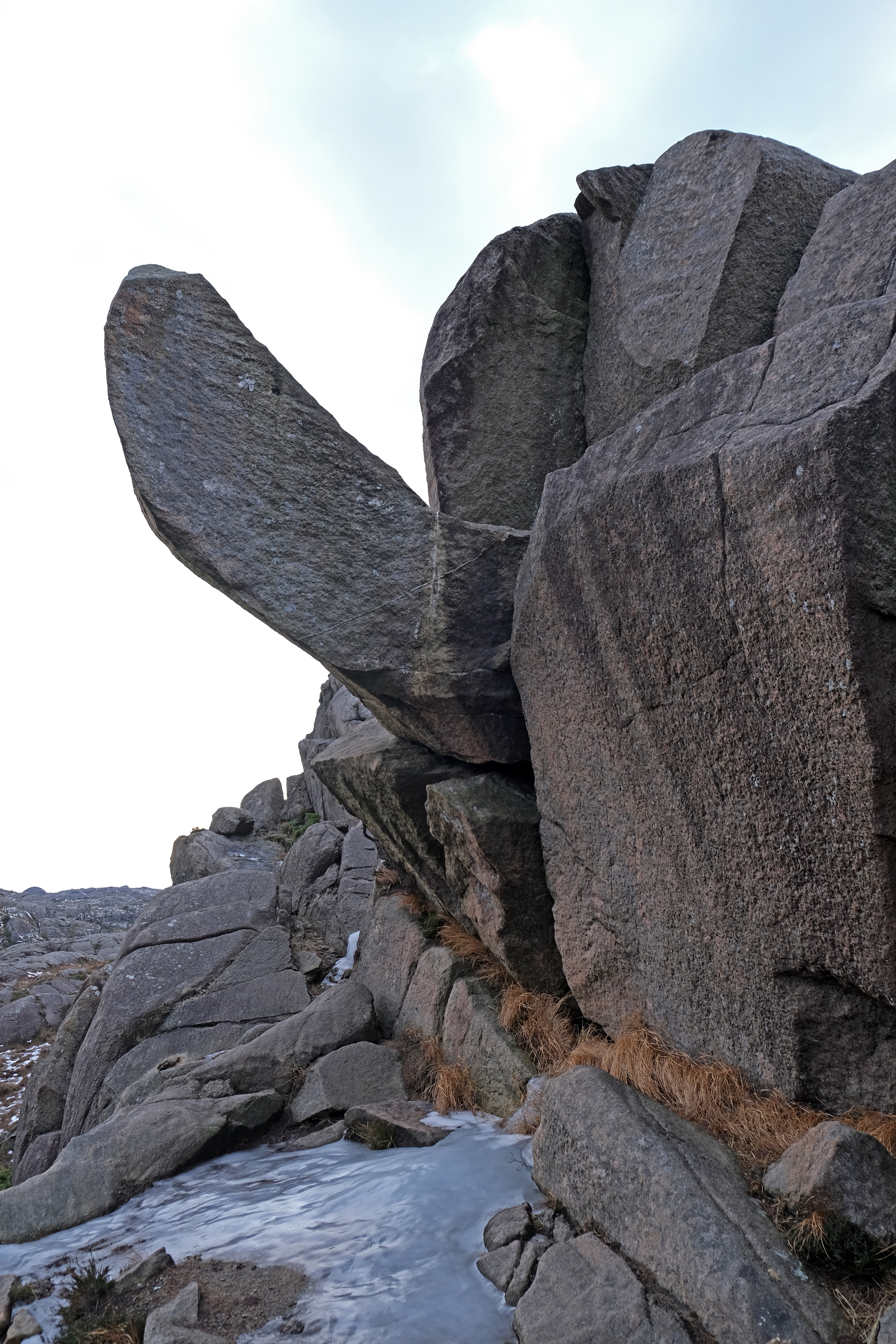
- Trollpikken in 2023
- Interactive map of Trollpikken
- Coordinates: 58°28′11″N 6°04′49″E
- Location: Rogaland, Norway

Trollpikken (lit. 'the Troll's dick') is a rock formation in Eigersund Municipality in Rogaland county, Norway. The formation is located between Kjervall and Veshovda. It is a rock jutting out from a cliff face to a height of almost 12 metres (39 ft) resembles an erect penis. In June 2017, the rock was severed using power tools; it was reattached the following month after a crowdfunding campaign.

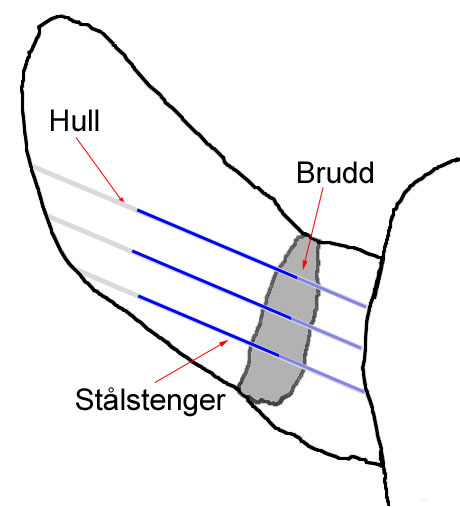
Diagram of reconstruction showing inserted metal rods

== History ==
The local tourist board was discussing using Trollpikken to draw tourists in a similar manner to Trolltunga (lit. 'the troll's tongue') and Preikestolen (lit. 'the preacher's pulpit') by providing parking when on June 24, 2017, joggers discovered that the approximately 10-tonne (9.8-long-ton; 11-short-ton) formation had been severed using power tools. 226,000 kroner was raised online to reattach it using a crane assembled on-site; a contractor told a Norwegian TV station, "We have the Viagra it takes." It was successfully reattached on July 7, using a combination of cement, glue and metal fittings. By late that month, parking and signs had been provided and NRK reported that at least one suspect had been arrested for the vandalism.

== Name ==
Kjetil Bentsen named the rock formation in January 2017; an effort is underway to have it marked on maps. A staff member at the Romsdal Museum indicated that numerous rock formations in Norway have similarly humorous names, although pikk is a relatively new word in the language for the penis. Bentsen and one other have applied to the Norwegian Patent Office for trademark rights to the name.
