= Helleland =

Village in Eigersund Municipality, Norway

- Village
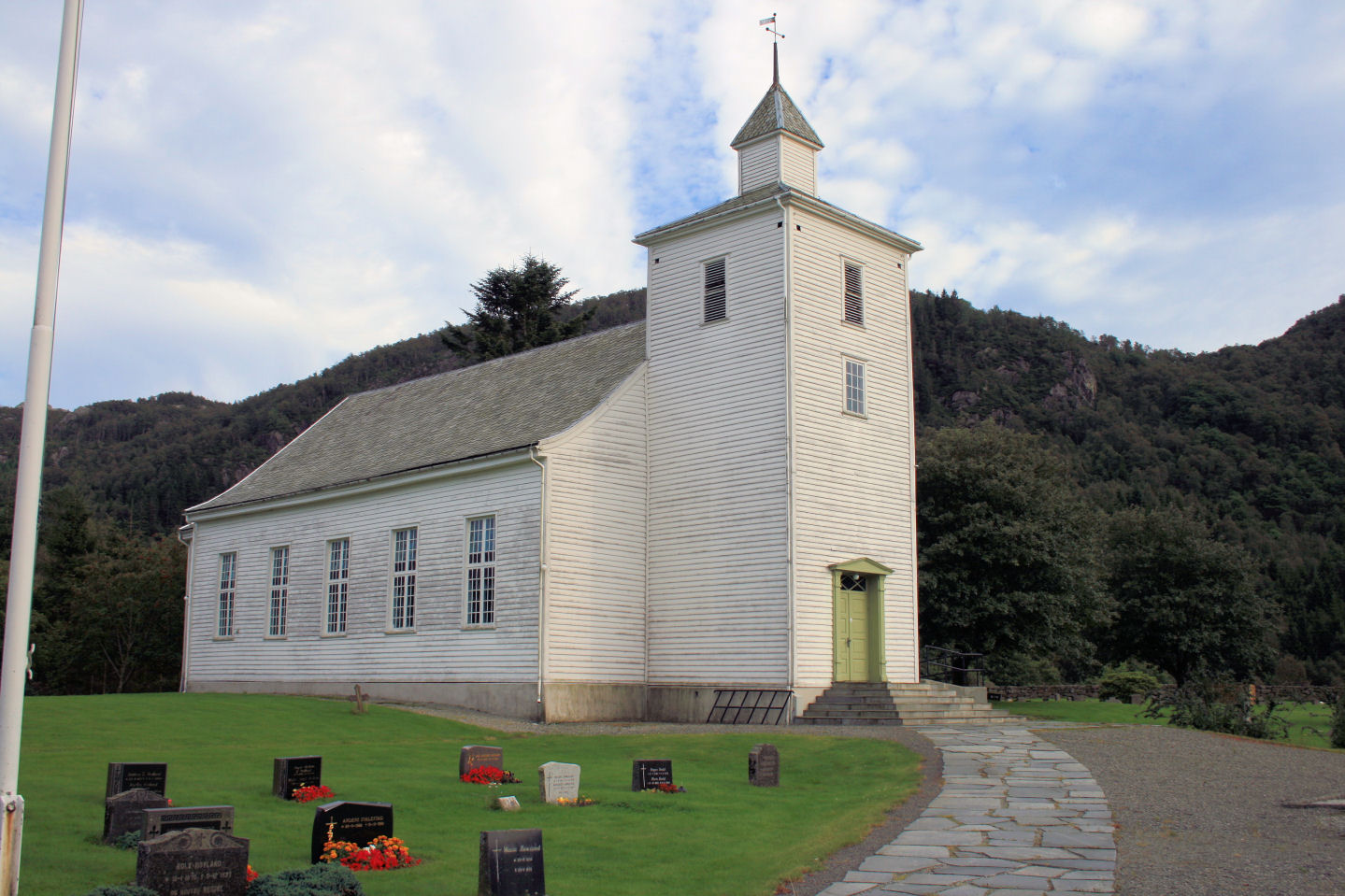
- View of the village church
- Interactive map of Helleland
- Coordinates: 58.52384°N 6.1172°E
- Country: Norway
- Region: Western Norway
- County: Rogaland
- District: Dalane
- Municipality: Eigersund Municipality
- Elevation: 95 m (312 ft)
- Time zone: UTC+01:00 (CET)
  - Summer (DST): UTC+02:00 (CEST)
- Post Code: 4376 Helleland

Helleland is a village in Eigersund Municipality in Rogaland county, Norway. The village is located along the river Hedlandsåna and the European route E39 highway, about 13 kilometres (8.1 mi) northeast of the town of Egersund. The Sørlandet Line runs along the river near Helleland, stopping at Helleland Station.

== History ==
Historically, the Helleland prestegjeld included all the churches in Helleland, Bjerkreim, Øvrebygd, and Heskestad. The main church for the prestegjeld was Helleland Church in Helleland. The Helleland parish was established as Helleland Municipality under the formannskapsdistrikt law on 1 January 1838. That municipality existed until 1965. Since then, the parish of Helleland has just included the "rural" northern part of Eigersund Municipality.

Helleland Church (Helleland kirke) dates from 1832. It was built of wood and has 500 seats. The architect was Hans Linstow (1787–1851) who also designed the Royal Palace in Oslo and much of the surrounding park and the street Karl Johans gate.

At Helleland there are memorials dedicated to the British aircraft which crashed during the occupation of Norway by Nazi Germany in connection with the Operation Freshman sabotage attempt, a part of action which was aimed at the Vemork hydroelectric plant, site of the heavy water production.
