= Jan Petter Rasmussen =

Norwegian politician

- Born: 1 June 1947 (age 78); Stavanger, Norway
- Occupation: Politician

Jan Petter Rasmussen (born 1 June 1947) is a Norwegian politician.

He was born in Stavanger to Otto Rasmussen and Jenny Bakke. Rasmussen served as mayor of Eigersund Municipality from 1990 to 1996. He was elected representative to the Storting for the period 1997–2001 for the Labour Party.
