= Eigerøya =

Island in Rogaland, Norway

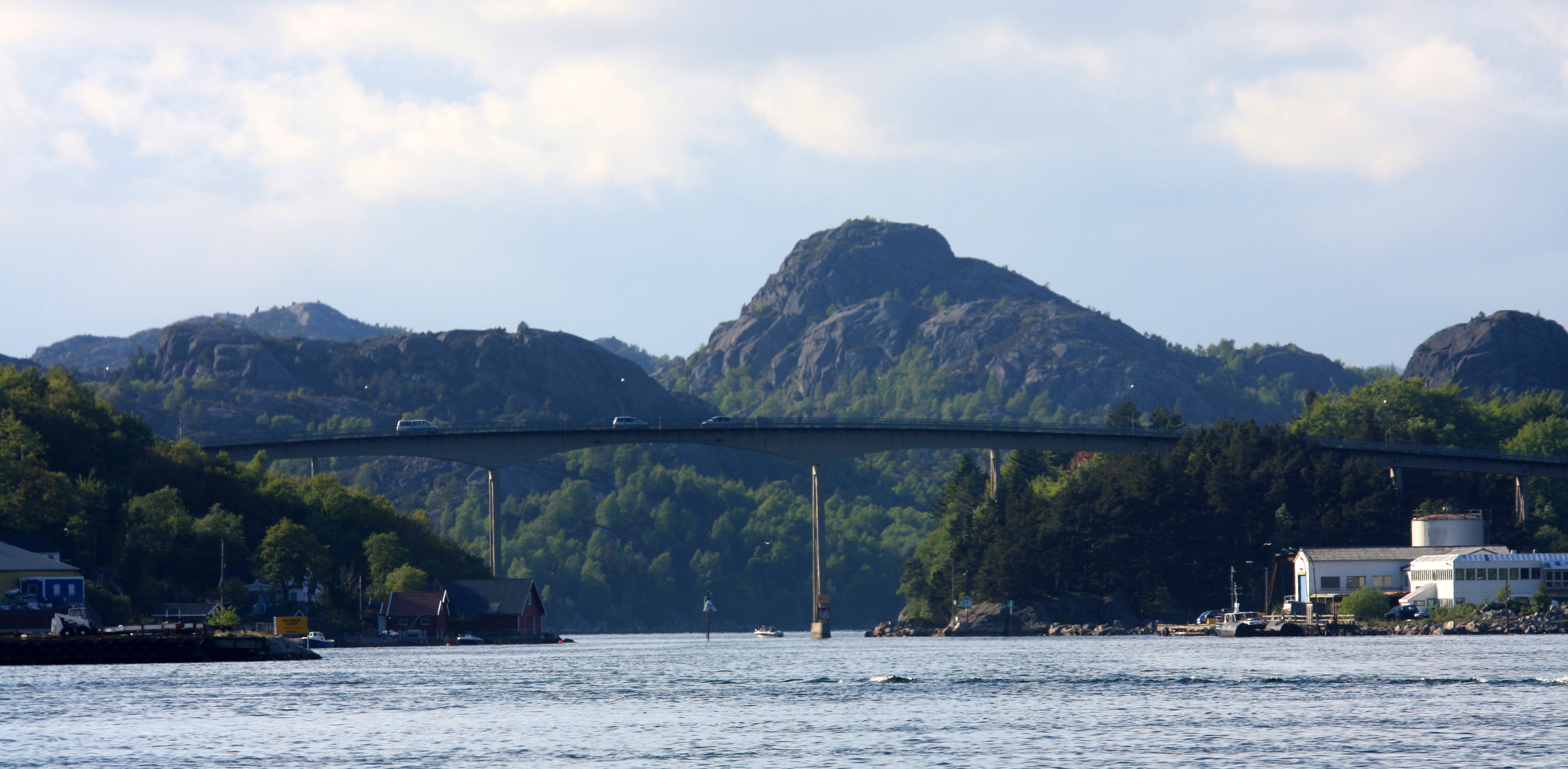
- Eigerøy Bridge connects Eigerøya to the mainland
- Interactive map of the island

Geography
- Location: Rogaland, Norway
- Coordinates: 58.4423°N 5.8934°E
- Area: 19.9 km^{2} (7.7 sq mi)
- Length: 6.5 km (4.04 mi)
- Width: 7 km (4.3 mi)
- Highest elevation: 131 m (430 ft)
- Highest point: Varden

Administration
- Norway
- County: Rogaland
- Municipality: Eigersund Municipality

Demographics
- Population: 2394 (2015)
- Pop. density: 120.3/km^{2} (311.6/sq mi)

Eigerøya is an island in Eigersund Municipality in Rogaland county, Norway. The 19.9-square-kilometre (7.7 sq mi) island lies just off the mainland coast in the town of Egersund. The highest point on the island is the 131-metre (430 ft) tall Varden. The U-shaped island is divided into two parts by the Lundarviga bay. The northwestern (smaller) side of the island is called Nordre Eigerøya and the larger side on the southeast is called Søre Eigerøya.

Eigerøya is separated from the mainland by a narrow 13-kilometre (8.1 mi) long strait. The Eigerøy Bridge crosses the strait and connects Eigerøya to the mainland. The island has fish processing industry and other industries. Two lighthouses are located at the island: Eigerøy Lighthouse and Vibberodden Lighthouse.

A naval battle was fought off the island by the British and Batavian navies at the action of 22 August 1795.

== See also ==
- List of islands of Norway
