= Eigerøy Lighthouse =

Coastal lighthouse in Eigersund, Norway

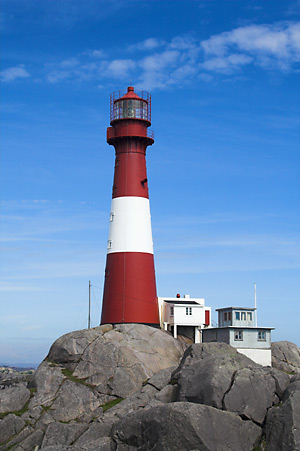
- View of the lighthouse
- Location: Rogaland, Norway
- Coordinates: 58°25′51″N 5°52′03″E

Tower
- Constructed: 1854
- Construction: Cast iron
- Automated: 1989
- Height: 33 m (108 ft)
- Shape: Tapered cylindrical tower
- Markings: Red with one white stripe
- Heritage: cultural property

Light
- Focal height: 46.5 m (153 ft)
- Lens: First order Fresnel lens
- Intensity: 3,905,000 Candela
- Range: 18.8 nmi (34.8 km; 21.6 mi)
- Characteristic: Fl(3) W 30s
- Norway no.: 094500

Eigerøy Lighthouse (Norwegian: Eigerøy fyr) is a coastal lighthouse located at the small island of Midbrødøya which is located immediately west of the island of Eigerøya in Eigersund Municipality in Rogaland county, Norway. It was established in 1854 and automated in 1989.

This was Norway's first cast iron lighthouse, and its success encouraged the building of many more on the Norwegian coastline. The light sits at an elevation of 46.5 metres (153 ft) above sea level, sitting atop a 32.9-metre (108 ft) tall tower. The light emits three white flashes every 30 seconds. The light uses a 1st order Fresnel lens and produces a 3,905,000-candela light. The light can be seen from all directions for up to 18.8 nautical miles (34.8 km; 21.6 mi).

The tower is attached to a 2-story service building. The lighthouse is painted red with one white horizontal band. The lighthouse was automated in 1989 and it remains under the control of the Kystverket. There are a limited number of tours available. It is accessible by road and the tower is open for touring on Sundays in July.

== See also ==
- Lighthouses in Norway
- List of lighthouses in Norway
