= Eigersund Municipality =

Municipality in Rogaland, Norway

Eigersund Municipality Eigersund kommune
- Municipality
- Egersund herred (historic name); Egersund landdistrikt (historic name)
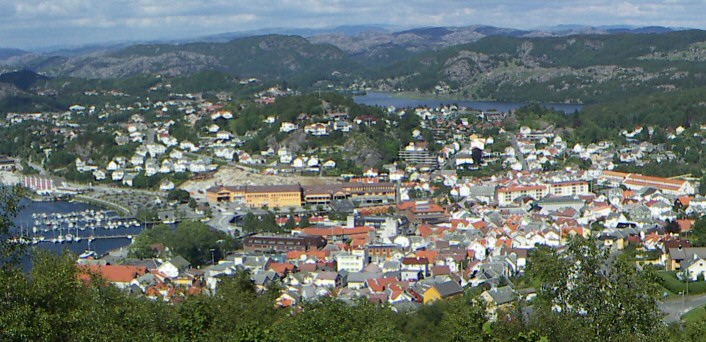
- View of the town of Egersund

- Flag Coat of arms

- Rogaland within Norway

- Eigersund within Rogaland
- Coordinates: 58°28′42″N 06°03′47″E
- Country: Norway
- County: Rogaland
- District: Dalane
- Established: 1 Jan 1838
  - Created as: Formannskapsdistrikt
- Administrative centre: Egersund

Government
  - Mayor (2023): Anja Hovland (H)

Area
  - Total: 432.51 km^{2} (166.99 sq mi)
  - Land: 387.44 km^{2} (149.59 sq mi)
  - Water: 45.07 km^{2} (17.40 sq mi) 10.4%
  - Rank: #227 in Norway
- Highest elevation: 903.93 m (2,965.6 ft)

Population (2026)
  - Total: 15,546
  - Rank: #80 in Norway
  - Density: 35.9/km^{2} (93/sq mi)
  - Change (10 years): ▲ +4%
- Demonym: Eigersunder

Official language
  - Norwegian form: Neutral
- Time zone: UTC+01:00 (CET)
  - Summer (DST): UTC+02:00 (CEST)
- ISO 3166 code: NO-1101
- Website: Official website

Eigersund is a municipality in Rogaland county, Norway. It is in the traditional district of Dalane. The administrative centre of the municipality is the town of Egersund. The town was known for its pottery factory (closed in 1979) and it is among Norway's biggest fishing ports. The villages of Helleland, Hellvik, and Hestnes are also in Eigersund.

The island of Eigerøya lies just off shore from Egersund. The island has several well-known businesses and attractions including the Eigerøy war memorial from World War II.

The 432.51-square-kilometre (166.99 sq mi) municipality is the 227th largest by area out of the 357 municipalities in Norway. Eigersund Municipality is the 80th most populous municipality in Norway with a population of 15,546. The municipality's population density is 35.9 inhabitants per square kilometre (93/sq mi) and its population has increased by 4% over the previous 10-year period.

== General information ==
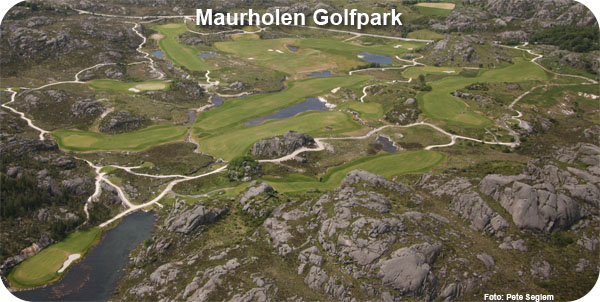
Aerial view of a golf course in Eigersund

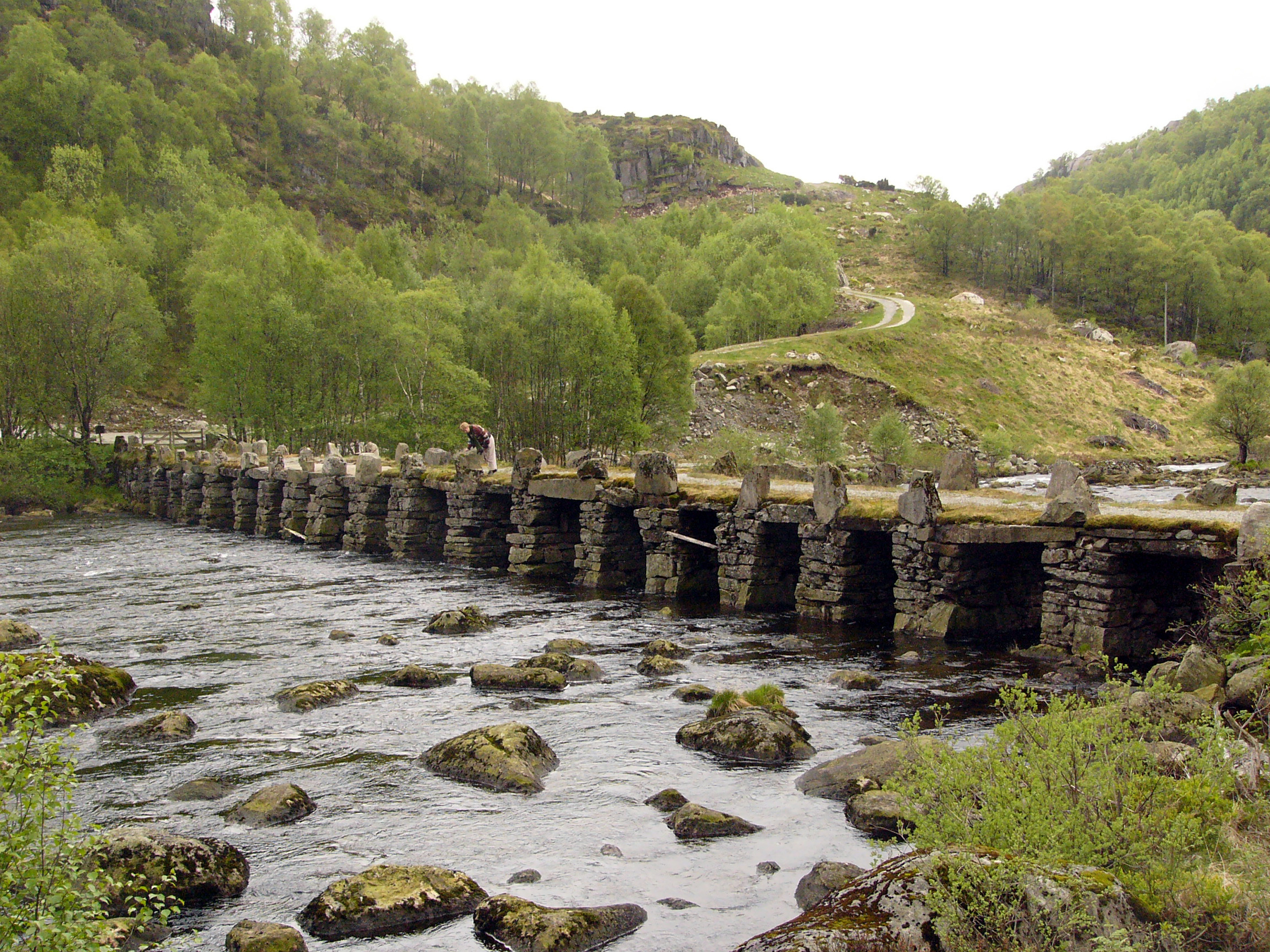
Historic stone bridge

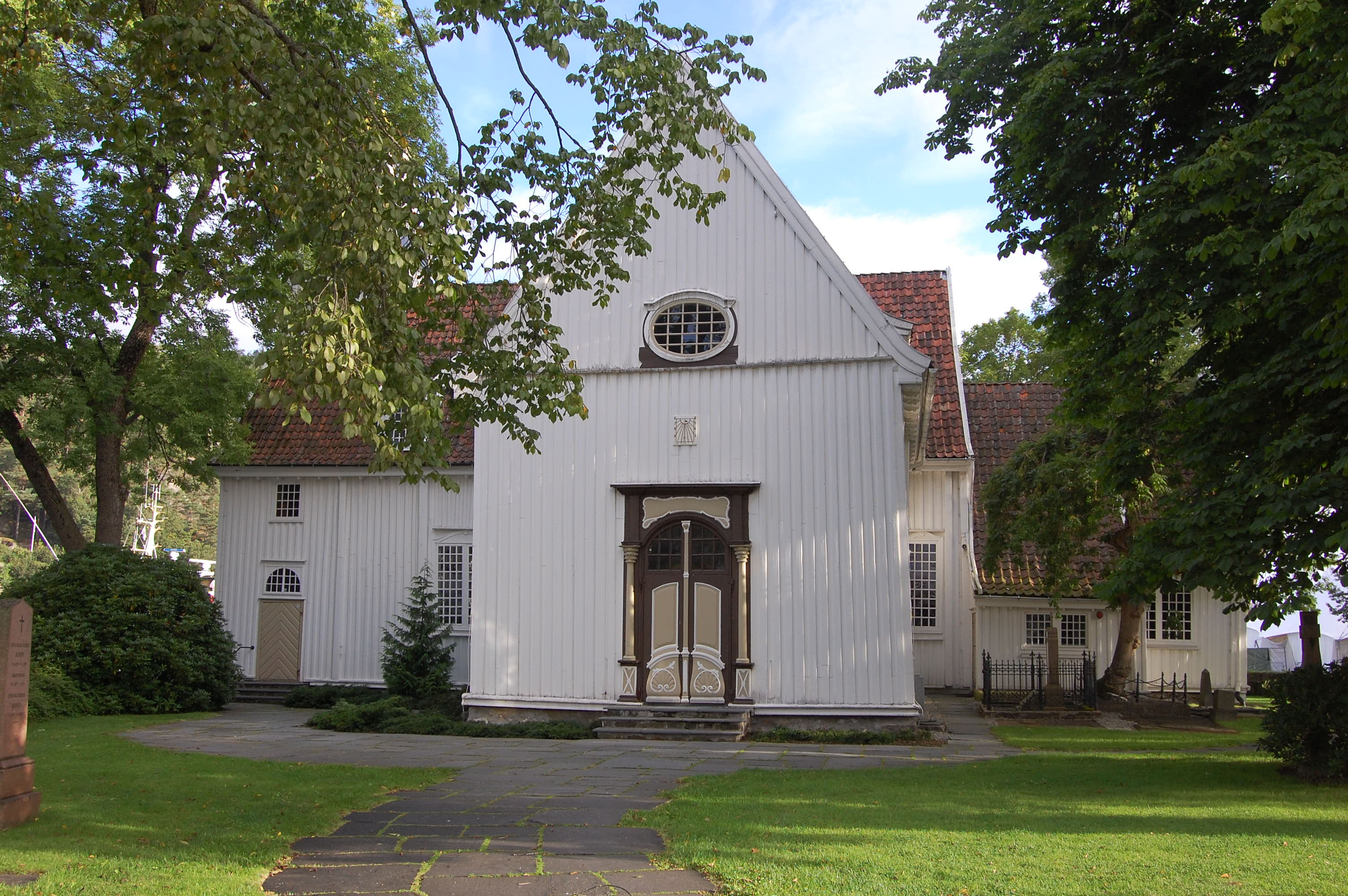
Egersund Church

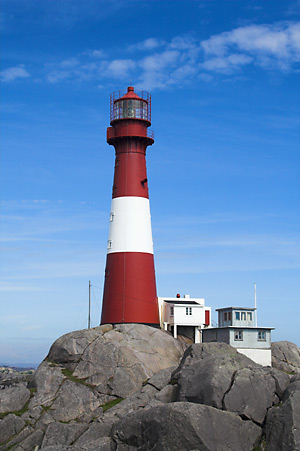
Eigerøy Lighthouse

The rural parish surrounding the town of Egersund was established as the municipality of Egersund landdisstrikt (lit. 'Egersund rural district', later called Eigersund Municipality) on 1 January 1838 (see formannskapsdistrikt law). In 1839, the northwestern district (population: 825) was separated to form the new Ogne Municipality.

On 12 December 1868, a small area of Eigersund Municipality (population: 41) was transferred to neighboring Sokndal Municipality. In 1947, an area of Eigersund Municipality immediately surrounding the town of Egersund (population: 515) was transferred into the town of Egersund and another area in Sokndal Municipality (population: 7) was transferred to Eigersund Municipality.

During the 1960s, there were many municipal mergers in Norway due to the work of the Schei Committee. On 1 January 1965, the following areas were merged to form a much larger Eigersund Municipality:

- the town of Egersund (population: 3,787)
- all of Eigersund Municipality (population: 4,664)
- all of Helleland Municipality (population: 851)
- the Gyadalen and Grøsfjel areas of Heskestad Municipality (population: 114).

On 1 January 1967, the Tjørn farm (population: 10) was transferred from Eigersund Municipality to Sokndal Municipality.

=== Name ===
The municipality (originally the parish) is named after the Eigersundet strait (Old Norse: Eikundarsund). The first element is the genitive case of the name of the island of Eikund (now Eigerøya). The name of the island comes from the word eik which means "oak" followed by the suffix -und which means "plentiful of" (i.e. "the island covered with oak trees"). The last element is sund which means "strait" or "sound".

"Egersund" vs. "Eigersund"

Historically, the name of the municipality was spelled Egersund. On 3 November 1917, a royal resolution changed the spelling of the name of the municipality to Eigersund. The town of Egersund within the municipality, however, did not change and it kept the old spelling. The form of the name spelled without the diphthong [ei] (Egersund) is the Danish language form of the name and at that time the municipal name was changed to use the Norwegian language form. The town kept the old spelling for historic purposes.

=== Coat of arms ===
The coat of arms was granted on 20 October 1972. The official blazon is "Vert, an oak leaf Or" (Norwegian: På grønn bunn et opprett gull eikeblad). This means the arms have a green field (background) and the charge is an oak leaf. The oak leaf has a tincture of Or which means it is commonly colored yellow, but if it is made out of metal, then gold is used. The arms are canting arms since the name is derived from Eikundarsund and the eik part means "oak". Oaks are also very common in the municipality. The arms were designed by Hallvard Trætteberg. The municipal flag has the same design as the coat of arms.

=== Churches ===
The Church of Norway has three parishes (sokn) within Eigersund Municipality. It is part of the Dalane prosti (deanery) in the Diocese of Stavanger.

Churches in Eigersund Municipality
Parish (sokn)	Church name	Location of the church	Year built
Egersund	Egersund Church	Egersund	1607
Egersund	Bakkebø Church	Egersund	1960
Eigerøy	Eigerøy Church	Eigerøya	1998
Helleland	Helleland Church	Helleland	1832

== History ==
The place that became the town of Egersund is mentioned in Snorri Sturluson's writings. Later, Christian IV set up a battery there.

== Government ==
Eigersund Municipality is responsible for primary education (through 10th grade), outpatient health services, senior citizen services, welfare and other social services, zoning, economic development, and municipal roads and utilities. The municipality is governed by a municipal council of directly elected representatives. The mayor is indirectly elected by a vote of the municipal council. The municipality is under the jurisdiction of the Sør-Rogaland District Court and the Gulating Court of Appeal.

=== Municipal council ===
The municipal council (Kommunestyre) of Eigersund Municipality is made up of 31 representatives that are elected to four year terms. The tables below show the current and historical composition of the council by political party.

Eigersund kommunestyre 2023–2027
Party name (in Norwegian)	Number of representatives
Labour Party (Arbeiderpartiet)	8
Progress Party (Fremskrittspartiet)	7
Conservative Party (Høyre)	7
Industry and Business Party (Industri‑ og Næringspartiet)	2
Christian Democratic Party (Kristelig Folkeparti)	3
Centre Party (Senterpartiet)	2
Socialist Left Party (Sosialistisk Venstreparti)	1
Liberal Party (Venstre)	1
Total number of members:	31

Eigersund kommunestyre 2019–2023
Party name (in Norwegian)	Number of representatives
Labour Party (Arbeiderpartiet)	10
Progress Party (Fremskrittspartiet)	6
Conservative Party (Høyre)	5
Christian Democratic Party (Kristelig Folkeparti)	3
Centre Party (Senterpartiet)	4
Socialist Left Party (Sosialistisk Venstreparti)	2
Liberal Party (Venstre)	1
Total number of members:	31

Eigersund kommunestyre 2015–2019
Party name (in Norwegian)	Number of representatives
Labour Party (Arbeiderpartiet)	10
Progress Party (Fremskrittspartiet)	5
Conservative Party (Høyre)	6
Christian Democratic Party (Kristelig Folkeparti)	5
Centre Party (Senterpartiet)	3
Socialist Left Party (Sosialistisk Venstreparti)	1
Liberal Party (Venstre)	1
Total number of members:	31

Eigersund kommunestyre 2011–2015
Party name (in Norwegian)	Number of representatives
Labour Party (Arbeiderpartiet)	8
Progress Party (Fremskrittspartiet)	4
Conservative Party (Høyre)	8
Christian Democratic Party (Kristelig Folkeparti)	6
Centre Party (Senterpartiet)	2
Socialist Left Party (Sosialistisk Venstreparti)	1
Liberal Party (Venstre)	2
Total number of members:	31

Eigersund kommunestyre 2007–2011
Party name (in Norwegian)	Number of representatives
Labour Party (Arbeiderpartiet)	9
Progress Party (Fremskrittspartiet)	6
Conservative Party (Høyre)	10
Christian Democratic Party (Kristelig Folkeparti)	5
Centre Party (Senterpartiet)	2
Socialist Left Party (Sosialistisk Venstreparti)	1
Liberal Party (Venstre)	2
Total number of members:	35

Eigersund kommunestyre 2003–2007
Party name (in Norwegian)	Number of representatives
Labour Party (Arbeiderpartiet)	8
Progress Party (Fremskrittspartiet)	6
Conservative Party (Høyre)	10
Christian Democratic Party (Kristelig Folkeparti)	4
Centre Party (Senterpartiet)	3
Socialist Left Party (Sosialistisk Venstreparti)	1
Liberal Party (Venstre)	3
Total number of members:	35

Eigersund kommunestyre 1999–2003
Party name (in Norwegian)	Number of representatives
Labour Party (Arbeiderpartiet)	18
Progress Party (Fremskrittspartiet)	4
Conservative Party (Høyre)	9
Christian Democratic Party (Kristelig Folkeparti)	8
Centre Party (Senterpartiet)	3
Liberal Party (Venstre)	3
Total number of members:	45

Eigersund kommunestyre 1995–1999
Party name (in Norwegian)	Number of representatives
Labour Party (Arbeiderpartiet)	16
Progress Party (Fremskrittspartiet)	3
Conservative Party (Høyre)	8
Christian Democratic Party (Kristelig Folkeparti)	9
Centre Party (Senterpartiet)	5
Liberal Party (Venstre)	4
Total number of members:	45

Eigersund kommunestyre 1991–1995
Party name (in Norwegian)	Number of representatives
Labour Party (Arbeiderpartiet)	16
Progress Party (Fremskrittspartiet)	2
Conservative Party (Høyre)	9
Christian Democratic Party (Kristelig Folkeparti)	7
Centre Party (Senterpartiet)	6
Socialist Left Party (Sosialistisk Venstreparti)	2
Liberal Party (Venstre)	3
Total number of members:	45

Eigersund kommunestyre 1987–1991
Party name (in Norwegian)	Number of representatives
Labour Party (Arbeiderpartiet)	13
Progress Party (Fremskrittspartiet)	3
Conservative Party (Høyre)	12
Christian Democratic Party (Kristelig Folkeparti)	9
Centre Party (Senterpartiet)	4
Socialist Left Party (Sosialistisk Venstreparti)	1
Liberal Party (Venstre)	3
Total number of members:	45

Eigersund kommunestyre 1983–1987
Party name (in Norwegian)	Number of representatives
Labour Party (Arbeiderpartiet)	14
Progress Party (Fremskrittspartiet)	2
Conservative Party (Høyre)	13
Christian Democratic Party (Kristelig Folkeparti)	9
Centre Party (Senterpartiet)	3
Socialist Left Party (Sosialistisk Venstreparti)	1
Liberal Party (Venstre)	3
Total number of members:	45

Eigersund kommunestyre 1979–1983
Party name (in Norwegian)	Number of representatives
Labour Party (Arbeiderpartiet)	11
Conservative Party (Høyre)	16
Christian Democratic Party (Kristelig Folkeparti)	10
New People's Party (Nye Folkepartiet)	1
Centre Party (Senterpartiet)	3
Socialist Left Party (Sosialistisk Venstreparti)	1
Liberal Party (Venstre)	3
Total number of members:	45

Eigersund kommunestyre 1975–1979
Party name (in Norwegian)	Number of representatives
Labour Party (Arbeiderpartiet)	11
Conservative Party (Høyre)	9
Christian Democratic Party (Kristelig Folkeparti)	11
New People's Party (Nye Folkepartiet)	3
Centre Party (Senterpartiet)	5
Socialist Left Party (Sosialistisk Venstreparti)	1
Liberal Party (Venstre)	2
Cross-Party Alternative (Tverrpolitisk Alternativ)	3
Total number of members:	45

Eigersund kommunestyre 1971–1975
Party name (in Norwegian)	Number of representatives
Labour Party (Arbeiderpartiet)	14
Conservative Party (Høyre)	6
Christian Democratic Party (Kristelig Folkeparti)	8
Centre Party (Senterpartiet)	6
Liberal Party (Venstre)	5
Total number of members:	39

Eigersund kommunestyre 1967–1971
Party name (in Norwegian)	Number of representatives
Labour Party (Arbeiderpartiet)	15
Conservative Party (Høyre)	5
Christian Democratic Party (Kristelig Folkeparti)	7
Centre Party (Senterpartiet)	5
Liberal Party (Venstre)	7
Total number of members:	39

Eigersund kommunestyre 1963–1967
Party name (in Norwegian)	Number of representatives
Labour Party (Arbeiderpartiet)	7
Conservative Party (Høyre)	3
Christian Democratic Party (Kristelig Folkeparti)	4
Centre Party (Senterpartiet)	3
Liberal Party (Venstre)	4
Total number of members:	21

Eigersund herredsstyre 1959–1963
Party name (in Norwegian)	Number of representatives
Labour Party (Arbeiderpartiet)	6
Christian Democratic Party (Kristelig Folkeparti)	4
Centre Party (Senterpartiet)	3
Liberal Party (Venstre)	6
Local List(s) (Lokale lister)	2
Total number of members:	21

Eigersund herredsstyre 1955–1959
Party name (in Norwegian)	Number of representatives
Labour Party (Arbeiderpartiet)	6
Christian Democratic Party (Kristelig Folkeparti)	4
Farmers' Party (Bondepartiet)	4
Liberal Party (Venstre)	7
Total number of members:	21

Eigersund herredsstyre 1951–1955
Party name (in Norwegian)	Number of representatives
Labour Party (Arbeiderpartiet)	4
Christian Democratic Party (Kristelig Folkeparti)	4
Farmers' Party (Bondepartiet)	2
Liberal Party (Venstre)	6
Total number of members:	16

Eigersund herredsstyre 1947–1951
Party name (in Norwegian)	Number of representatives
Labour Party (Arbeiderpartiet)	4
Christian Democratic Party (Kristelig Folkeparti)	3
Farmers' Party (Bondepartiet)	3
Liberal Party (Venstre)	6
Total number of members:	16

Eigersund herredsstyre 1945–1947
Party name (in Norwegian)	Number of representatives
Labour Party (Arbeiderpartiet)	5
Liberal Party (Venstre)	8
Local List(s) (Lokale lister)	3
Total number of members:	16

Eigersund herredsstyre 1937–1941*
Party name (in Norwegian)	Number of representatives
Labour Party (Arbeiderpartiet)	2
Joint List(s) of Non-Socialist Parties (Borgerlige Felleslister)	13
Local List(s) (Lokale lister)	1
Total number of members:	16
Note: Due to the German occupation of Norway during World War II, no elections were held for new municipal councils until after the war ended in 1945.

=== Mayors ===
The mayor (Norwegian: ordfører) of Eigersund Municipality is the political leader of the municipality and the chairperson of the municipal council. The following people have held this position:

- 1838–1839: Torger Andersen Fodtland
- 1840–1841: Peder Torgersen Skadberg
- 1842–1843: Bernt Theophiliussen Bowitz
- 1844–1845: Tønnes Johnsen Aarstad
- 1846–1849: Jonas Sigmundsen Slettebø
- 1850–1853: Tønnes Johnsen Aarstad
- 1854–1855: Trond Aarstad
- 1856–1859: Anders Torgersen Tengs
- 1860–1861: Ole Sivertsen Svanæs
- 1862–1863: Anders Torgersen Tengs
- 1864–1865: Reinert Larsen Skjelbred
- 1866–1867: Anders Torgersen Tengs
- 1868–1869: Ole Sivertsen Svanes
- 1870–1873: Anders Torgersen Tengs
- 1874–1875: Anders Andersen Ege
- 1876–1879: Anders Torgersen Tengs
- 1880–1881: Salve Petersen Koldal
- 1882–1883: Anders Torgersen Tengs
- 1884–1887: Lars Bernhard Hansen Aase
- 1888–1893: Ingvald Aarstad
- 1894–1895: Tønnes Olsen Svanes
- 1896–1897: Ole Andreas Pedersen Slettebø
- 1898–1907: Ingvald Aarstad
- 1908–1910: Halvard Mjølsnes
- 1911–1913: Erik Stefanussen Heigrestad
- 1914–1916: Anders Larsen Øglend
- 1917–1919: Hans Ommundsen Slettebø
- 1920–1922: Anders Larsen Øglend
- 1923–1925: Hans Ommundsen Slettebø
- 1926–1931: Trygve Eie
- 1932–1937: Hans Ommundsen Slettebø
- 1938–1942: Trygve Eie
- 1946–1956: Jonas Severin Rodvelt
- 1956–1964: Tønnes Lædre
- 1965–1967: Sem Varhaug (Sp)
- 1967–1967: John Munkejord (H)
- 1968–1971: Tor Friestad (KrF)
- 1971–1971: Erling Bergundhaugen (Ap)
- 1972–1975: Rasmann Polden (Sp)
- 1976–1983: Bjørn Bårdsen (KrF)
- 1984–1987: Jostein Sirevåg (KrF)
- 1988–1989: Olaf Aurdal (H)
- 1990–1996: Jan Petter Rasmussen (Ap)
- 1996–1996: Solveig Ege Tengesdal (KrF)
- 1996–2003: Marit Myklebust (Ap)
- 2003–2007: John Skaara (H)
- 2007–2011: Terje Jørgensen Jr. (H)
- 2011–2015: Leif Erik Egaas (H)
- 2015–2023: Odd Stangeland (Ap)
- 2023–present: Anja Hovland (H)

== Geography ==
Eigersund Municipality extends from the North Sea coast in the west to the border with Sirdal Municipality in Agder county in the east. It borders Hå Municipality and Bjerkreim Municipality to the north and Sokndal Municipality to the south. The municipality is centered on the town of Egersund, and includes the island of Eigerøya. The landscape includes many rivers and lakes, as well as woods and several barren rocky and heather-clad moors. The lakes Grøsfjellvatnet, Eiavatnet, Nodlandsvatnet, and Teksevatnet lie in the municipality. The highest point in the municipality is the 903.93-metre (2,965.6 ft) tall mountain Store Skykula, located on the border with Bjerkreim Municipality.

=== Eigerøya ===
Eigerøya is an island off the coast of Egersund. The island is connected to the mainland over Eigerøy bridge, which was completed in 1951. The island's coastline is characterized by a number of small bays, as well as Lundarviga. Eigerøya is divided almost in two of the large bay of Lundarviga. The island is surrounded by a number of small islets. Eigerøy Lighthouse and Vibberodden Lighthouse are both located along the shores of Eigerøya.

=== Climate ===
Climate data for Eigerøya
Month	Jan	Feb	Mar	Apr	May	Jun	Jul	Aug	Sep	Oct	Nov	Dec	Year
Mean daily maximum °C (°F)	3.0 (37.4)	2.8 (37.0)	4.3 (39.7)	7.4 (45.3)	12.2 (54.0)	14.8 (58.6)	16.2 (61.2)	16.6 (61.9)	13.6 (56.5)	10.8 (51.4)	7.1 (44.8)	4.8 (40.6)	9.5 (49.1)
Daily mean °C (°F)	1.1 (34.0)	0.7 (33.3)	2.3 (36.1)	4.8 (40.6)	9.0 (48.2)	12.1 (53.8)	13.4 (56.1)	14.1 (57.4)	11.7 (53.1)	9.1 (48.4)	5.2 (41.4)	2.7 (36.9)	7.2 (45.0)
Mean daily minimum °C (°F)	−0.5 (31.1)	−1.0 (30.2)	0.5 (32.9)	2.4 (36.3)	7.0 (44.6)	9.6 (49.3)	11.4 (52.5)	12.1 (53.8)	9.6 (49.3)	7.0 (44.6)	3.3 (37.9)	1.1 (34.0)	5.2 (41.4)
Average precipitation mm (inches)	121 (4.8)	80 (3.1)	95 (3.7)	68 (2.7)	77 (3.0)	76 (3.0)	96 (3.8)	117 (4.6)	154 (6.1)	168 (6.6)	163 (6.4)	135 (5.3)	1,350 (53.1)
Average precipitation days (≥ 1 mm)	16.2	10.7	13.1	10.9	9.9	9.5	10.3	11.2	15.9	17.3	19.3	17.5	161.8
Source: Norwegian Meteorological Institute

== Transportation ==
European route E39 runs through the municipality, passing the village of Helleland. The Sørlandet Line runs through the municipality, stopping at Egersund Station and Hellvik Station.

== Notable people ==
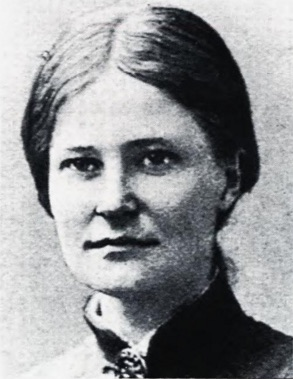
Anna Bugge, 1880s

- Michael Birkeland (1830 in Eigersund – 1896), a historian, civil servant, and politician
- Peter C. Assersen (1839 in Egersund – 1906), a civil engineer and Rear Admiral in US Navy
- Bernt B. Lomeland (1836 in Helleland – 1900), a school teacher and lay minister
- Elisabeth Fedde (1850–1921), a Lutheran Deaconess who lived in Egersund from 1895
- Anna Bugge (1862 in Egersund – 1928), a Norwegian & Swedish feminist, lawyer, diplomat, and politician
- Jacob Thorkelson (1876 in Egersund – 1945), a US Congressman from Montana
- Jack Nielsen (1896 in Egersund – 1981), a Norwegian tennis player and six-time national champion
- Paulus Svendsen (1904 in Egersund – 1989), a literary historian, wrote biographies of Western philosophers
- Thorbjørn Feyling (1907 in Egersund – 1985), a ceramist with Stavangerflint AS
- Johnny Stenberg (born 1925 in Eigersund - 1990), a politician who was mayor of Meråker from 1966 to 1973
- John Olav Larssen (1927 in Hellvik – 2009), an evangelical preacher and missionary
- Gunnar Kvassheim (born 1953 in Eigersund), a journalist and Norwegian politician
- Bengt Sæternes (born 1975 in Egersund), a former footballer with 478 club caps and 7 for Norway
