= Helleland Church =

Church in Rogaland, Norway

- Helleland kyrkje
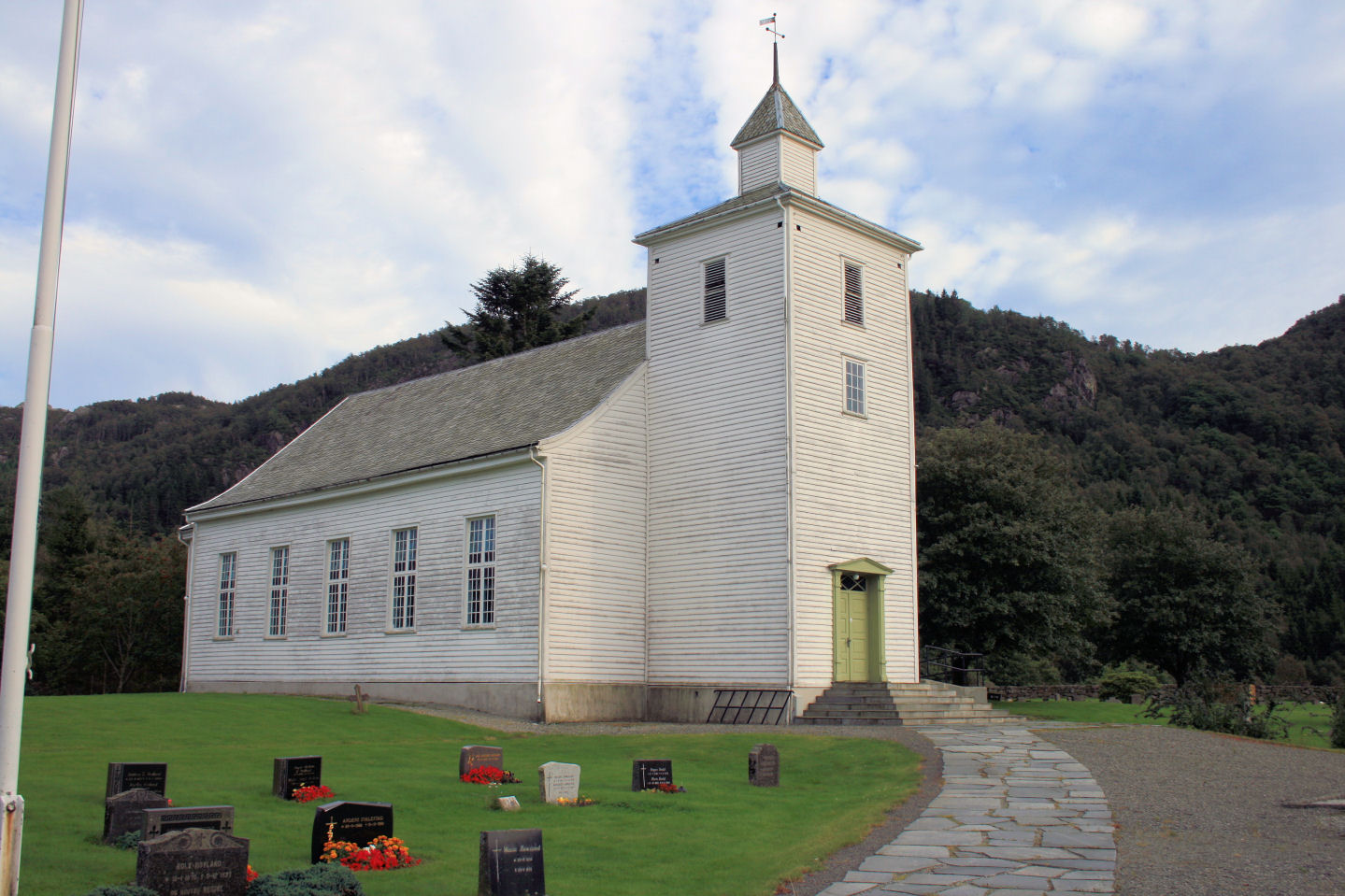
- View of the church
- Helleland Church
- 58.520651°N 6.159958°E
- Location: Eigersund Municipality, Rogaland
- Country: Norway
- Denomination: Church of Norway
- Churchmanship: Evangelical Lutheran

History
- Status: Parish church
- Founded: 13th century
- Consecrated: 1832

Architecture
- Functional status: Active
- Architect: Hans Linstow
- Architectural type: Long church
- Completed: 1832 (194 years ago)

Specifications
- Capacity: 500
- Materials: Wood

Administration
- Diocese: Stavanger bispedømme
- Deanery: Dalane prosti
- Parish: Helleland
- Norwegian Cultural Heritage Site
- Type: Church
- Status: Automatically protected
- ID: 84537

Helleland Church (Norwegian: Helleland kirke) is a parish church of the Church of Norway in Eigersund Municipality in Rogaland county, Norway. It is located in the village of Helleland. It is the church for the Helleland parish which is part of the Dalane prosti (deanery) in the Diocese of Stavanger. The white, wooden church was built in a long church style in 1832 using plans drawn up by the architect Hans Linstow. The church seats about 500 people.

== History ==
The earliest existing historical records of the church date back to the year 1380, but it was built well before that time. The first church may have been a stave church dating back to the 13th century. In 1629, the old church was torn down and replaced with a new timber-framed building in a long church style. Some of the materials from the old church were reused in the construction of the new church.

In 1814, this church served as an election church (Norwegian: valgkirke). Together with more than 300 other parish churches across Norway, it was a polling station for elections to the 1814 Norwegian Constituent Assembly which wrote the Constitution of Norway. This was Norway's first national elections. Each church parish was a constituency that elected people called "electors" who later met together in each county to elect the representatives for the assembly that was to meet at Eidsvoll Manor later that year.

In 1832, the church was torn down and replaced with a new church on the same site (this is the present church which is still in use). The new church was much larger, seating about 500 people.

== See also ==
- List of churches in Rogaland
