= Egersund =

Town in Rogaland, Norway

- Town/City
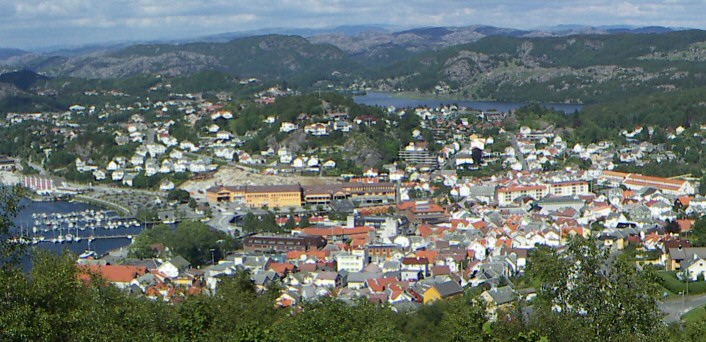
- View of the town
- Interactive map of Egersund
- Coordinates: 58.45246°N 6.00178°E
- Country: Norway
- Region: Western Norway
- County: Rogaland
- District: Dalane
- Municipality: Eigersund Municipality
- Established as
- Ladested: 18 July 1798

Area
  - Total: 7.01 km^{2} (2.71 sq mi)
- Elevation: 2 m (6.6 ft)

Population (2025)
  - Total: 11,902
  - Density: 1,698/km^{2} (4,400/sq mi)
- Demonym: Egersundar
- Time zone: UTC+01:00 (CET)
  - Summer (DST): UTC+02:00 (CEST)
- Post Code: 4370 Egersund
- Former municipality
- Egersund ladested
- Rogaland within Norway

- Egersund within Rogaland
- Country: Norway
- County: Rogaland
- District: Dalane
- Established: 1 Jan 1838
  - Created as: Formannskapsdistrikt
- Disestablished: 1 Jan 1964
  - Succeeded by: Eigersund Municipality
- Administrative centre: Egersund

Government
  - Mayor (1954-1964): Karl Jensen (H)

Area (upon dissolution)
  - Total: 0.64 km^{2} (0.25 sq mi)
  - Rank: #680 in Norway

Population (1963)
  - Total: 3,823
  - Rank: #238 in Norway
  - Density: 5,973.4/km^{2} (15,471/sq mi)
  - Change (10 years): ▼ −6.3%

Official language
  - Norwegian form: Bokmål
- Time zone: UTC+01:00 (CET)
  - Summer (DST): UTC+02:00 (CEST)
- ISO 3166 code: NO-1101

Egersund (Norwegian: [/eːɡɛˈʂʉn/]) is a town in Eigersund Municipality in Rogaland county, Norway. The town is located along the southwestern coast of Norway, about 75 kilometres (47 mi) south of the city of Stavanger. The town is situated along a strait which separates the mainland from the island of Eigerøya. From 1838 until 1964, the town was also an independent municipality.

The 7.01-square-kilometre (1,730-acre) town has a population (2025) of 11,902 and a population density of 1,698 inhabitants per square kilometre (4,400/sq mi).

Egersund has one of the best natural harbours in Norway, and it used to be the largest harbour in Norway when measured in quantity of fish brought in each year (surpassed by Ålesund in 2006). The tidal range, the difference in height between high tide and low tide, is practically zero due to the presence of an amphidromic point. Several internationally known companies have divisions here, like Navico (earlier Robertson autopilots) and Jeppesen Norway formerly C-MAP Norway (producer of electronic sea-maps). In addition, the Aker Solutions corporation owns and runs a large installation here which specializes in the building of parts for oil platforms. Most of the industry is related to the sea and to boats.

== History ==
=== Early history ===
People have lived around the area of Egersund since the Stone Age. There are several places around Egersund where one can find ruins of settlements dating back to the age of migrations in Norway (400–600 BC).

=== Middle Ages ===
There used to be a church here, the Church of St. Mary, mentioned in 1292 in a privilege of indulgence issued in Rome on 5 February 1292 by Pope Nicholas IV as Ecclesia beatæ Mariæ de Eikundarsund. It was the first church in Egersund, and was the parish church of the St. Mary parish. It is believed to have been located where the present Egersund Church stands today. Old folklore from Egersund also says that before the Church of St. Mary, an altar where people sacrificed to the old Norse gods was placed here, but this has not been verified from any sources except old stories.

There was also a chapel, the chapel of St. Laurenti, mentioned in a letter issued on 5 February 1308 as Ecclesia beati Laurentii de Eikundarsund, where Pope Clement V gives King Håkon V Magnusson extensive privileges concerning the King's 14 chapels (including the chapel of St. Laurenti), which was founded by himself or his father, King Magnus Lagabøte, and his grandfather, King Håkon Håkonson. Since these chapels often were built on the king's estates, it is presumed to have been on grounds owned by the Husaby estate. An old tradition says it was located at what is now "Strandgata 43", but the exact position is somewhat uncertain.

=== 17th and 18th centuries ===
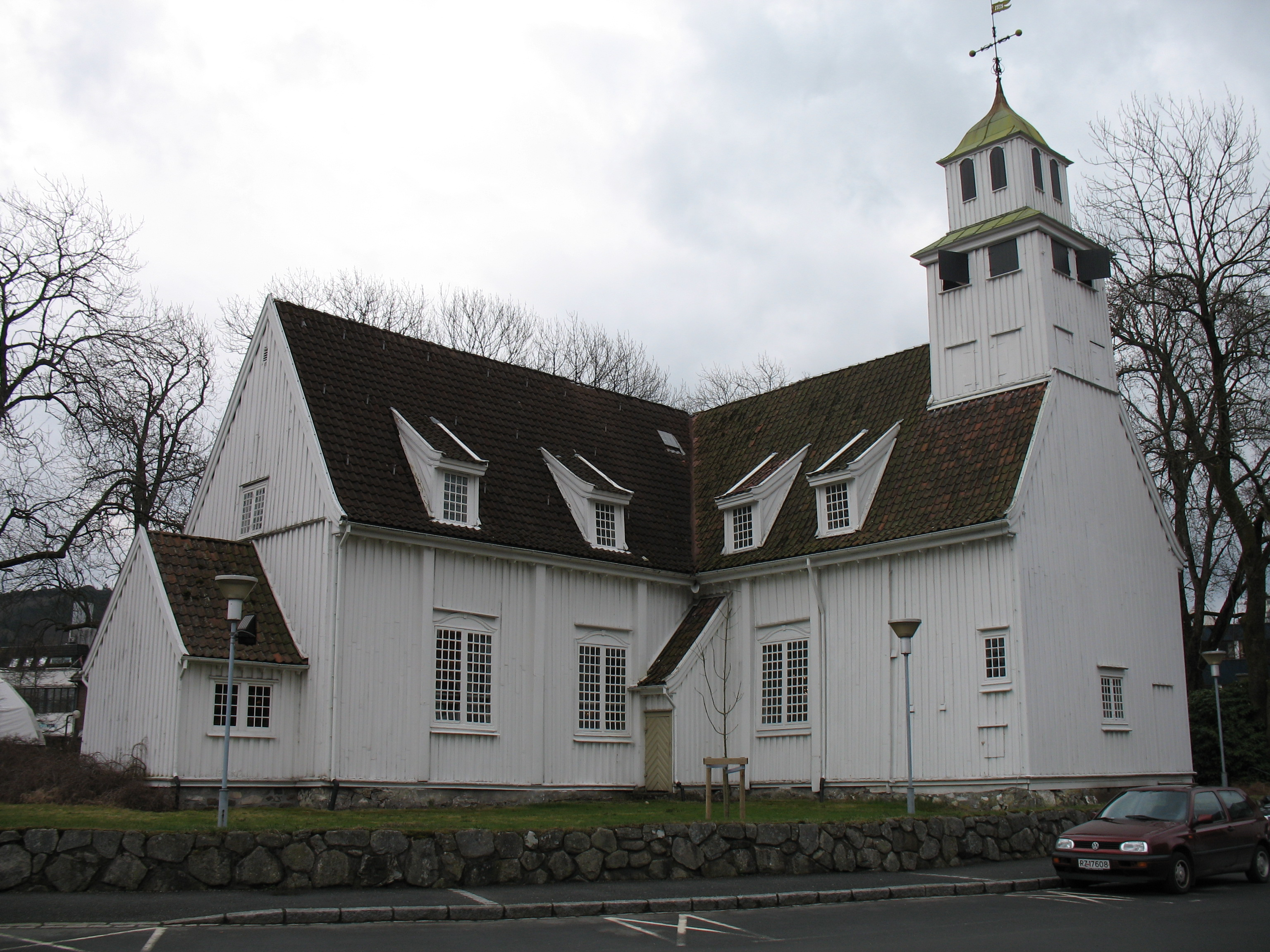
Present-day Egersund Church

In 1623 the old church (probably the Church of St. Mary) was demolished and a new Egersund Church was erected. This building still stands today.

On 18 July 1798, the village of Egersund was established as a ladested with its own customs office.

=== 19th and 20th centuries ===
The ladested of Egersund was established as a municipality on 1 January 1838 under the new formannskapsdistrikt law. This gave Egersund the municipal self-government that was now uniformly given to all areas of Norway.

In 1843, a fire destroyed two thirds of the town, allowing a major redesign of streets. In 1847, Johan Feyer founded A/S Egersunds Fayancefabriks Co., which became the town's major employer until closing in 1979.

On 7 July 1859, there was another major fire, and another again on 20 October 1862. This was the last major town fire, since town planners finally understood wooden structures' vulnerability and reconstructed buildings using extra wide streets to prevent fires from spreading.

In 1878, the Jærensbanen railway line between Egersund and the city of Stavanger opened with Egersund Station in the center of the town. In 1905, Egersund became the first town in Rogaland county to get electrical lighting.

On 9 April 1940, the German military invaded Norway and they occupy Egersund during World War II. Egersund had strategic importance because of its harbour, as well as because the telegraph line between Norway and England was situated there. The Germans built large camps in the area. The occupation lasted until the end of the war.

In 1947, the town was growing rapidly and an area of the neighboring Eigersund Municipality (population: 515) was transferred into the town of Egersund.

During the 1960s, the Schei Committee met in Norway to discuss the municipal structure in the nation. It was decided that the number of cities and municipalities in Norway was too large. On 1 January 1965, the town of Egersund lost its status as a self-governing municipality. On that date, the following places were all merged into the new, larger Eigersund Municipality, with the town of Egersund as the new administrative centre:

- the town of Egersund (population: 3,787)
- all of Eigersund Municipality (population: 4,664)
- all of Helleland Municipality (population: 851)
- the Gyadalen and Grøsfjell areas of Heskestad Municipality (population: 114)

=== Name ===
The town (originally the parish) is named after the Eigersundet strait (Old Norse: Eikundarsund). The first element is the genitive case of the name of the island of Eikund (now Eigerøya). The name of the island comes from the word eik which means "oak" followed by the suffix -und which means "plentiful of" (i.e. "the island covered with oak trees"). The last element is sund which means "strait" or "sound". The name is among the oldest place names in Norway. It can already be found in the form Eikundarsund in the Norse saga of Olav the Holy, written by Icelandic author Snorri Sturlasson in the 13th century. From around the year 1000 Olav the Holy's fleet was here often. We can also find the name in texts and scaldic poems from Olav's saga.

"Egersund" vs. "Eigersund"

During the 1910s, the name of the municipality was changed from Egersund to Eigersund, but the town of Egersund within Eigersund Municipality kept the old spelling. The form of the name spelled without the diphthong [ei] (Egersund) is the Danish language form of the name and at that time the municipal name was changed to use the Norwegian language form. The town kept the old spelling for historic purposes.

== Municipal self-government (1838-1964) ==
From 1838 until 1964, the town of Egersund was an independent municipality. While it existed like this, Egersund MunicipalityMunicipality was responsible for primary education (through 10th grade), outpatient health services, senior citizen services, welfare and other social services, zoning, economic development, and municipal roads and utilities. The municipality was governed by a municipal council of directly elected representatives. The mayor was indirectly elected by a vote of the municipal council. The municipality was under the jurisdiction of the Dalane District Court and the Gulating Court of Appeal.

=== Municipal council ===
The municipal council (Bystyre) of Egersund Municipality was made up of 29 representatives that were elected to four year terms. The tables below show the historical composition of the council by political party.

Egersund bystyre 1963
Party name (in Norwegian)	Number of representatives
Labour Party (Arbeiderpartiet)	13
Conservative Party (Høyre)	7
Christian Democratic Party (Kristelig Folkeparti)	5
Liberal Party (Venstre)	4
Total number of members:	29
Note: On 1 January 1964, the town of Egersund became part of Eigersund Municipality.

Egersund bystyre 1959–1963
Party name (in Norwegian)	Number of representatives
Labour Party (Arbeiderpartiet)	13
Conservative Party (Høyre)	6
Communist Party (Kommunistiske Parti)	1
Christian Democratic Party (Kristelig Folkeparti)	5
Liberal Party (Venstre)	4
Total number of members:	29

Egersund bystyre 1955–1959
Party name (in Norwegian)	Number of representatives
Labour Party (Arbeiderpartiet)	13
Conservative Party (Høyre)	6
Communist Party (Kommunistiske Parti)	1
Christian Democratic Party (Kristelig Folkeparti)	6
Liberal Party (Venstre)	3
Total number of members:	29

Egersund bystyre 1951–1955
Party name (in Norwegian)	Number of representatives
Labour Party (Arbeiderpartiet)	12
Conservative Party (Høyre)	5
Communist Party (Kommunistiske Parti)	1
Christian Democratic Party (Kristelig Folkeparti)	6
Liberal Party (Venstre)	4
Total number of members:	28

Egersund bystyre 1947–1951
Party name (in Norwegian)	Number of representatives
Labour Party (Arbeiderpartiet)	13
Communist Party (Kommunistiske Parti)	3
Christian Democratic Party (Kristelig Folkeparti)	7
Joint list of the Liberal Party (Venstre) and the Radical People's Party (Radikale Folkepartiet)	5
Total number of members:	28
Note: The Conservative Party originally had enough votes to earn 6 representatives but the Ministry of Justice rejected all those votes due to an error in the original election list.

Egersund bystyre 1945–1947
Party name (in Norwegian)	Number of representatives
Labour Party (Arbeiderpartiet)	12
Conservative Party (Høyre)	5
Communist Party (Kommunistiske Parti)	3
Christian Democratic Party (Kristelig Folkeparti)	4
Joint list of the Liberal Party (Venstre) and the Radical People's Party (Radikale Folkepartiet)	3
Local List(s) (Lokale lister)	1
Total number of members:	28

Egersund bystyre 1937–1941*
Party name (in Norwegian)	Number of representatives
Labour Party (Arbeiderpartiet)	6
Temperance Party (Avholdspartiet)	8
Conservative Party (Høyre)	7
Communist Party (Kommunistiske Parti)	2
Liberal Party (Venstre)	5
Total number of members:	28
Note: Due to the German occupation of Norway during World War II, no elections were held for new municipal councils until after the war ended in 1945.

Egersund bystyre 1934–1937
Party name (in Norwegian)	Number of representatives
Labour Party (Arbeiderpartiet)	5
Temperance Party (Avholdspartiet)	10
Conservative Party (Høyre)	6
Communist Party (Kommunistiske Parti)	1
Liberal Party (Venstre)	6
Total number of members:	28

Egersund bystyre 1931–1934
Party name (in Norwegian)	Number of representatives
Labour Party (Arbeiderpartiet)	5
Temperance Party (Avholdspartiet)	11
Communist Party (Kommunistiske Parti)	1
Liberal Party (Venstre)	5
Joint list of the Conservative Party (Høyre) and the Free-minded People's Party (Frisinnede Folkeparti)	6
Total number of members:	28

Egersund bystyre 1928–1931
Party name (in Norwegian)	Number of representatives
Labour Party (Arbeiderpartiet)	7
Temperance Party (Avholdspartiet)	9
Communist Party (Kommunistiske Parti)	1
Liberal Party (Venstre)	4
Joint list of the Conservative Party (Høyre) and the Free-minded Liberal Party (Frisinnede Venstre)	7
Total number of members:	28

Egersund bystyre 1925–1928
Party name (in Norwegian)	Number of representatives
Labour Party (Arbeiderpartiet)	1
Temperance Party (Avholdspartiet)	9
Social Democratic Labour Party (Socialdemokratiske Arbeiderparti)	6
Liberal Party (Venstre)	4
Joint list of the Conservative Party (Høyre) and the Free-minded Liberal Party (Frisinnede Venstre)	7
Workers' Common List (Arbeidernes fellesliste)	1
Total number of members:	28

Egersund bystyre 1922–1925
Party name (in Norwegian)	Number of representatives
Labour Party (Arbeiderpartiet)	3
Temperance Party (Avholdspartiet)	10
Conservative Party (Høyre)	6
Social Democratic Labour Party (Socialdemokratiske Arbeiderparti)	5
Liberal Party (Venstre)	4
Total number of members:	28

Egersund bystyre 1919–1922
Party name (in Norwegian)	Number of representatives
Labour Party (Arbeiderpartiet)	5
Temperance Party (Avholdspartiet)	11
Conservative Party (Høyre)	8
Liberal Party (Venstre)	4
Total number of members:	28

=== Mayors ===
The mayor (Norwegian: ordfører) of Egersund Municipality was the political leader of the municipality and the chairperson of the municipal council. The following people have held this position:

- 1838–1838: Gunder Jacobsen Bjerckeland
- 1839–1839: Isach P. Brodahl
- 1840–1840: Gunder Jacobsen Bjerckeland
- 1841–1841: Isach P. Brodahl
- 1842–1842: Andreas Faye-Lund
- 1843–1843: Gunnar R. Titus Eide
- 1844–1844: Andreas Faye-Lund
- 1845–1845: Gunnar R. Titus Eide
- 1846–1846: Aanen Atlaksen
- 1847–1847: Ole A. Bodum
- 1848–1848: Tollak Bowitz
- 1849–1849: Nils A. Nøsted
- 1850–1850: Ole Hamre
- 1851–1851: Sigbjørn Egelandsdal
- 1852–1852: Ole Hamre
- 1853–1853: Johan Fredrik Feyer
- 1854–1854: Rasmus Torjusen
- 1855–1856: Michael Puntervold
- 1857–1857: Gunder Jacobsen Bjerckeland
- 1858–1858: Michael Puntervold
- 1859–1859: Gunder Jacobsen Bjerckeland
- 1860–1860: Johan Stiansen Vemmestad
- 1861–1861: Johan Feyer
- 1862–1862: Johannes Eriksen Ollestad
- 1863–1863: Fredrik Bøckman
- 1864–1864: Wilhelm Bøe
- 1865–1865: Christen M. Feyer
- 1866–1866: Iver Carlsen
- 1867–1867: Osmund Olsen Lindefjeld
- 1868–1868: Theodor Christian Bernhoft
- 1869–1869: Tønnes Houge Puntervold
- 1870–1870: Lars Samuelsen Bowitz
- 1871–1871: Anders Bøe
- 1872–1872: Wilhelm Bøe
- 1873–1874: Thorvald Rynning
- 1875–1875: Tønnes Houge Puntervold
- 1876–1877: Adolf Birkeland
- 1878–1879: Thorvald Rynning
- 1880–1881: Adolf Birkeland
- 1882–1882: Anders Bøe
- 1883–1883: Adolf Birkeland
- 1884–1885: Christen M. Feyer (H)
- 1886–1887: Adolf Birkeland (V)
- 1888–1889: Thorvald Rynning (H)
- 1889–1891: Adolf Birkeland (V)
- 1892–1894: Magnus Feyling (V)
- 1895–1898: Hans Thu (V)
- 1899–1907: Erik H. Torjusen (V)
- 1908–1909: Thomas Dybing (V)
- 1910–1915: Hans Thu (AvH)
- 1916–1916: Thomas Dybing (V)
- 1917–1917: Geirulv Albretsen (H)
- 1918–1918: Jacob G. Åse (V)
- 1919–1920: Geirulv Albretsen (H)
- 1921–1922: Christian Michelsen (H)
- 1923–1925: Ole A. Kjellberg (AvH)
- 1926–1928: I: ngjald Mehus (AvH)
- 1929–1929: Einar Øxnevad (H)
- 1930–1930: Odd H. Torjusen (V)
- 1931–1931: Einar Øxnevad (H)
- 1932–1934: Hans Berentsen (AvH)
- 1934–1935: Odd H. Torjusen (V)
- 1935–1935: Hjalmar Fardal (H)
- 1936–1936: Tollak P. Rygh (AvH)
- 1937–1937: Albert Melhus (H)
- 1938–1938: Adolf A. Albrethsen (H)
- 1939–1940: Asbjørn Hadland (V)
- 1946–1951: Edvard M. Edvardsen (Ap)
- 1952–1953: Thor Tingbø (KrF)
- 1954–1964: Karl Jensen (H)

== Transportation ==
Egersund has good connections by road to the cities of Stavanger and Kristiansand, via the European route E39 highway. There is also a more scenic coastal highway Norwegian County Road 44. There is an hourly train connections northwards to Stavanger, while express and regional trains run southwards towards Kristiansand and Oslo.

== Neighborhoods ==
Egersund is divided up into several neighborhoods

- Central (the central part of the town) It is further divided into:
  - Damsgård, Havsøyne, Husabø, Lervige, Mosbekk, Årstad, Årstaddalen
- Hestnes (far south part of the town)
- Lagård (along the lake)
- Rundevoll (central-south part of the town)
- Sandbakkan (far southeastern part of the town)
- Slettebø (far northeastern part of the town)
- Søra Eigerøy / Søra Øyne (the south part of the island of Eigerøya)
- Norda Eigerøy / Nora Øyne (the north part of the island of Eigerøya)
- Tengs (far northwestern part of the town)
- Åsan (near the bridge to Eigerøya)

== Attractions ==
- Dalane Folkemuseum: Museum of antiquities and history of Egersund.
- Egersund Fayancemuseum: Museum of the glazed earthenware and porcelain made by Egersund Fayancefabrik from 1847 till 1979.
- «Stoplesteinan». A rather unknown attraction, since it has not been embraced by the local tourist bureau. «Stoplesteinan» is a smaller «Stonehenge», i.e. a stone circle. It is more than a thousand years old, and believed by some to be almost 2000 years old. Who built it and why, is unknown. The stone circle is situated directly above Skårabrekkå just outside downtown Egersund.
- Central Egersund houses some of the best preserved wood buildings in Norway. They are built in late Empire style, and most of the buildings are protected by law.
- Magma UNESCO Global Geopark: open air geological park provided with facilities for outdoor activities to discover the amazing geological heritage of the area. From November 2017 in Egersund headquarter will be open to the public the geoVR virtual exhibition.
- Home to the popular Trollpikken rock formation.
