= Western Norway =

Region of Norway

Coordinates: 60°53′16″N 6°43′25″E

Western Norway Vestlandet (Norwegian)
- Region (landsdel)
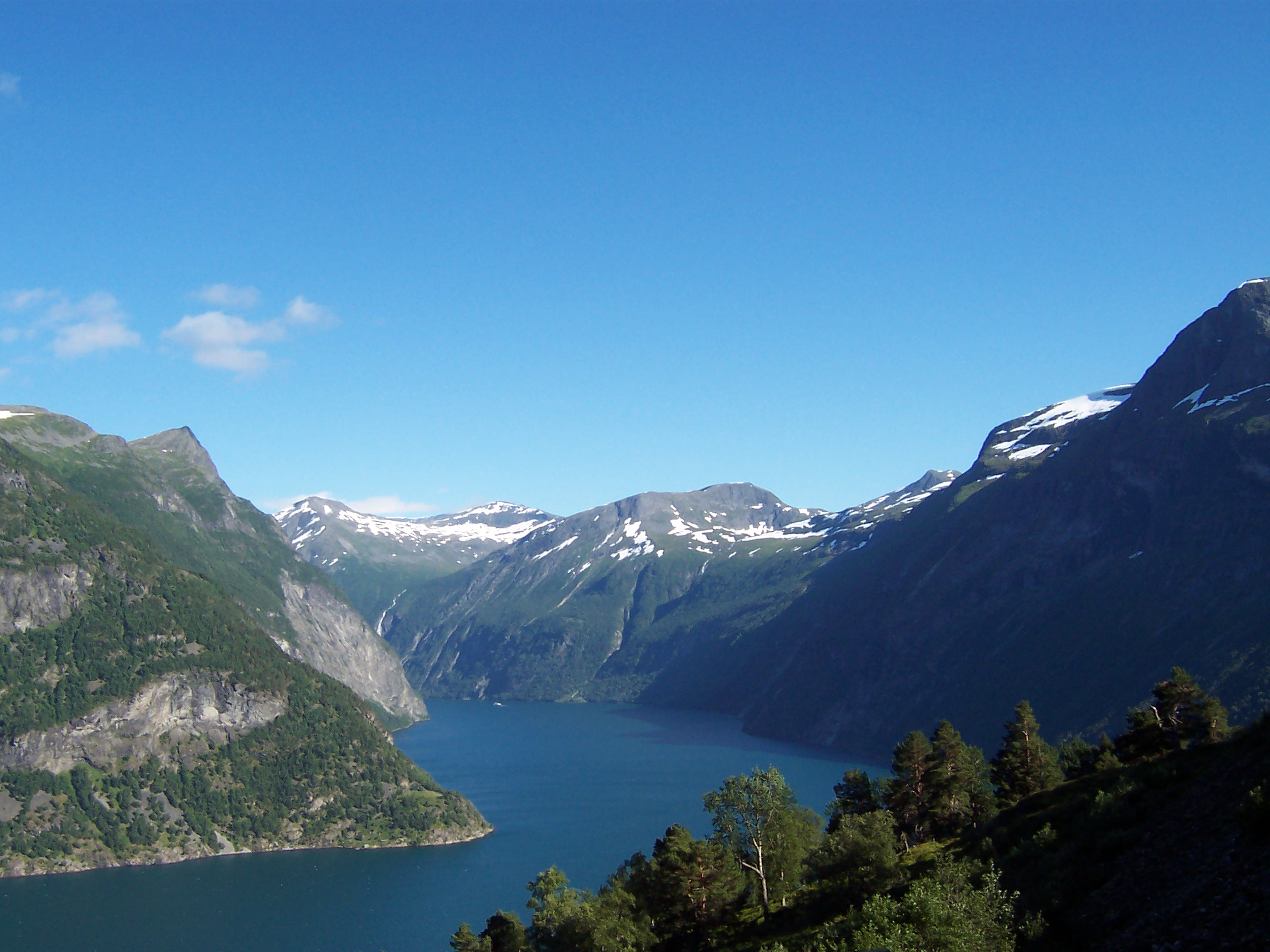

- Country: Norway
- County capitals: Bergen; Molde; Stavanger
- Counties (fylker, fylke): Møre og Romsdal; Vestland; Rogaland

Area
  - Total: 58,582 km^{2} (22,619 sq mi)
  - Land: 55,411 km^{2} (21,394 sq mi)

Population (2020 est.)
  - Total: 1,528,200
  - Density: 27.579/km^{2} (71.430/sq mi)
- Demonym: Vestlending
- Nominal GDP (2013): $57 billion
- Nominal GDP per capita (2013): $41,000
- Website: Vestlandsrådet

Western Norway (Bokmål: Vestlandet, Vest-Norge; Nynorsk: Vestlandet, Vest-Noreg) is the region along the Atlantic coast of South Norway. It consists of the counties Rogaland, Vestland, and Møre og Romsdal. The region has no official or political-administrative function. The region has a population of approximately 1.4 million people. The largest city is Bergen and the second-largest is Stavanger. Historically the regions of Agder, Vest-Telemark, Hallingdal, Valdres, and northern parts of Gudbrandsdal have been included in Western Norway.

Western Norway, as well as other parts of historical regions of Norway, shares a common history with Denmark, the Faroe Islands and Iceland and to a lesser extent the Netherlands and Britain. For example, the Icelandic horse is a close relative of the Fjord horse and both the Faroese and Icelandic languages are based on the Old West Norse.

In early Norse times, people from Western Norway became settlers at the Western Isles in the Northern Atlantic, England, Scotland, Ireland, Orkney, Shetland, France, the Faroe Islands and Iceland. During the Viking Age settlements were made at the Hebrides and Man.

In early modern times, Western Norway experienced much emigration to the United States, Canada, and to a lesser extent to the United Kingdom. This applies particularly to the US states of Minnesota, North and South Dakota, Wisconsin, Montana, and the Canadian province of Manitoba. The Icelandic and Faroese people, and many people in the British Isles, are descendants of Norsemen and Vikings who emigrated from Western Norway during the Viking Age. On the other hand, thousands of Western Norwegians are descendants of Dutch and German traders who arrived in the 16th and the 17th centuries, especially in Bergen.

Vestland is also the name of a county consisting of two former counties, viz. Hordaland and Sogn og Fjordane. The two counties were re-merged after having been split in 1763 (then called Søndre Bergenhus and Nordre Bergenhus, respectively).

== History ==
=== Early history ===
Norway's history begins on the west coast, particularly in Rogaland. Excavations and rock art tells us that it was in Rogaland that the first humans settled in Norway, when the ice retreated after the last ice age ca. 10,000 years ago. There are many artifacts from the Stone Age in Rogaland. The preliminary oldest traces of humans are found in a settlement on Galta, Rennesøy, near the ferry terminal Mortavika and Vista in Randaberg Municipality. In the beginning there has been sure short visits by people from the south who hunted along the coast. It is thought that people came from Doggerland, the North Sea land area between Denmark and England, which disappeared when the ice retreated and sea levels rose. The people who lived there must now find a new land. Some retreated south again, while a few passed the Norwegian Trench (which was considerably smaller than now) in its hunt for deer and the new country.

=== Viking Age ===
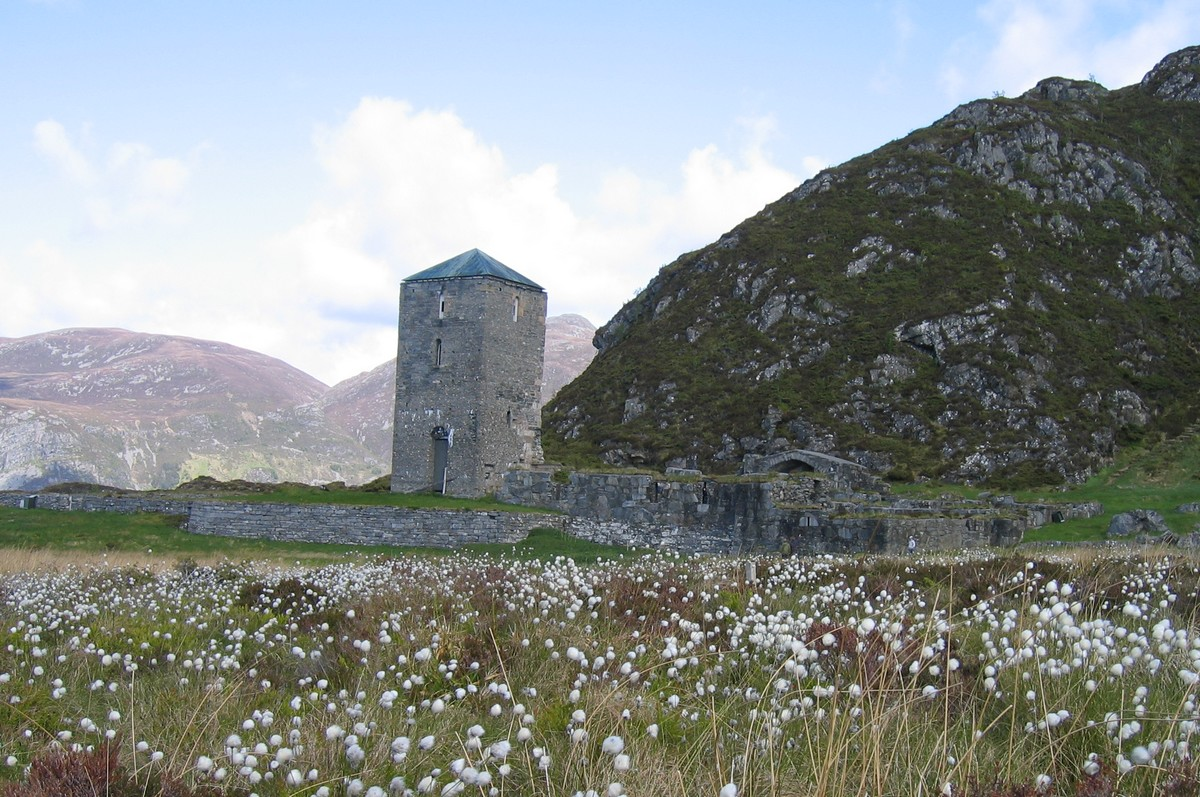
Selje Abbey was a Benedictine monastery located on the island of Selja, formerly known as Selø in Stad Municipality in Nordfjord.

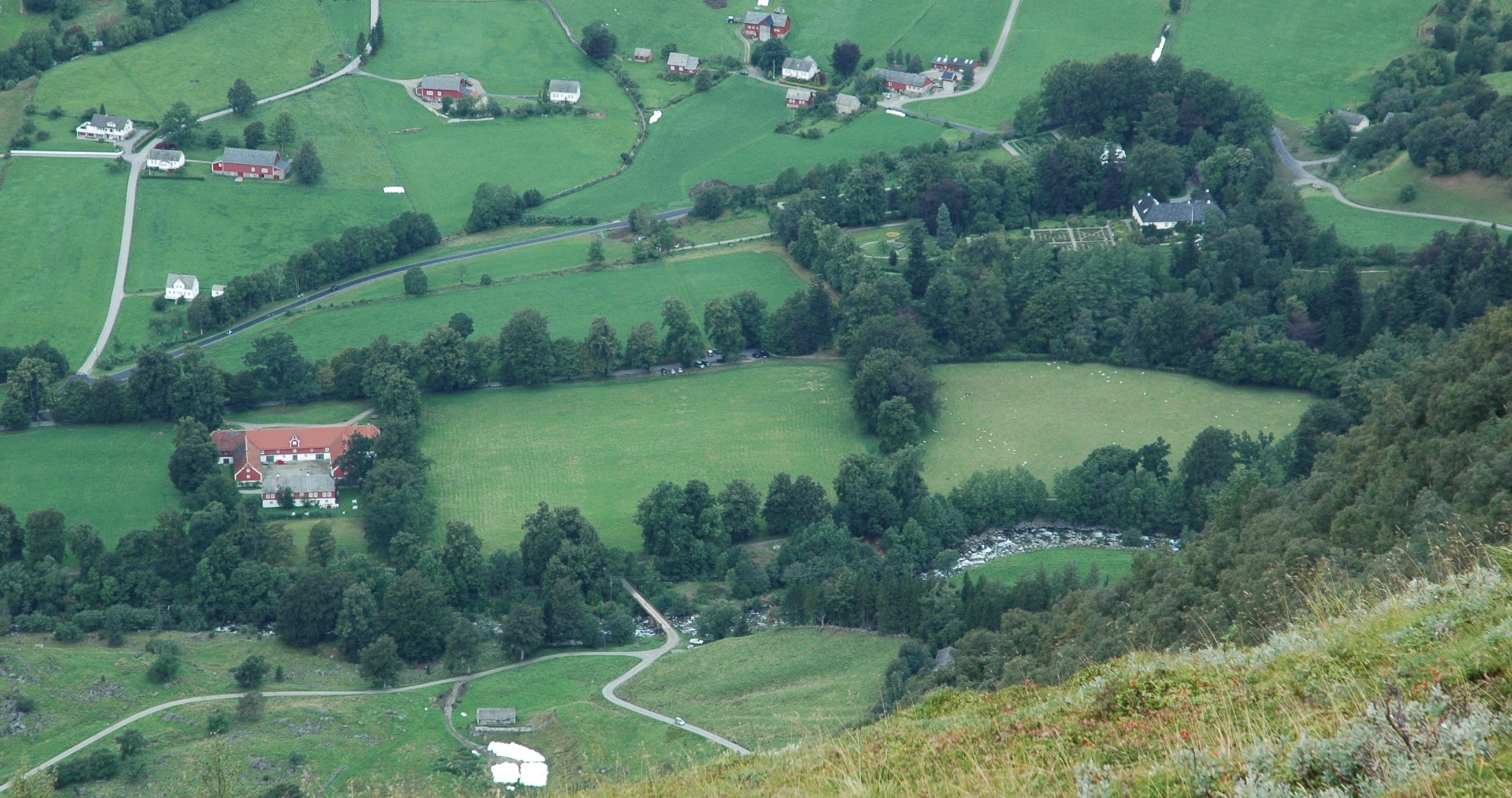
The Barony Rosendal in its garden to the right, the stud farm in red, as seen from Malmangernuten mountain. The barony is often referred to as "The smallest castle in Scandinavia".

The region includes most of the scope of the old Gulating, which was founded around the year 900. The Gulating Act divided the country into the Western counties, which consisted of the former småkongedømmene that existed in the area before the unification of the 800's and then was converted to jarle judge. These were Sunnmørafylke (Sunnmøre), Firda County (Fjordane), Sygna County (Sogn), Hordafylke (Hordaland), Rygjafylke (Rogaland) and Egdafylke (Agder).

Harald Hairfair united Norway and parts of Sweden west of Lake Vänern and Götaälv in the 9th century from his Castle Avaldsnes on Karmøy near Haugesund. Norway was named from the Way North by seafaring.

Before the millennium, iron was introduced and used in agriculture, and there was a shortage of land to cultivate. In the same period, the kings' power increased, and large tax claims caused many to seek freedom and fortune abroad. Many emigrated, and looting became an alternative source of income. Effective boats and weapons made the Vikings feared among contemporary Christian Europeans. But the images of Vikings as bloodthirsty plunderers are not always representative. The Vikings were involved in a wealthy merchant trade, not only in Europe but also including the Byzantine Empire and the Baghdad Caliphate.

Historically Vikings are often introduced with the Viking attack on Lindisfarne in 793, when they really made their mark in European history. The era ends with the Battle of Stamford Bridge in 1066. Vikings' seaworthiness and wanderlust resulted in new areas being developed. Norwegian settlers moved into the North Sea westward to Iceland, the Faroe Islands, Greenland, Shetland, Orkney, Isle of Man and the Hebrides. Settlements were established in the southeast corner of Ireland including in Dublin, Waterford and Wexford. Norwegians settled along the northwest area of England, principally in the area of modern-day Cumbria. The Norwegian Vikings also discovered Vinland, present-day America, long before Christopher Columbus.

=== Christianization ===
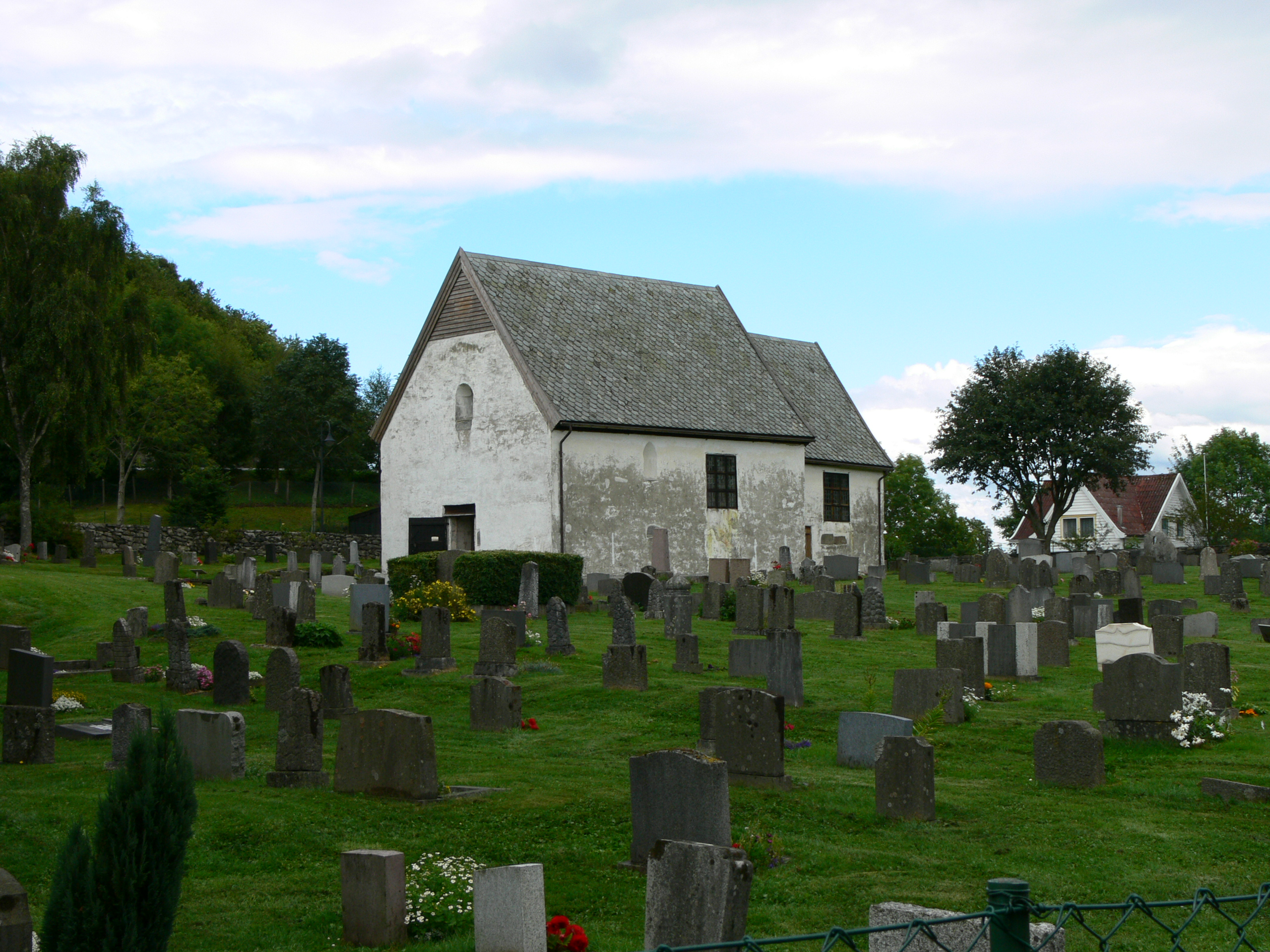
Old Moster Church, built in 995, it is one of the oldest churches in Norway. It is reported by Snorre that Olaf I of Norway had a church built there.

Christianity became the dominant religion in Norway in the 11th century, but the religion was probably known among Norwegians already in the 7th century. While Eastern Norway was introduced to Christianity by missionaries and monks from Germany and Friesland, Western Norway was mainly introduced to the religion by English, Scottish, Irish people and Vikings who had converted to Christianity. Norse paganism existed in some areas in Western Norway until being totally replaced by Christianity by the 13th century. The coastal areas were the first to be introduced to the new faith, and then the inland areas. Churches were established throughout the country.

=== Emigration to Iceland ===
The main source of information about the settlement period in Iceland is the Book of Settlements (Landnámabók), written in the 12th century, which gives a detailed account of the first settlers. According to this book, Western Norwegian sailors accidentally discovered the country. A few voyages of exploration were made soon after that and then the settlement started. Ingólfur Arnarson was said to be the first settler. He was a chieftain from Norway, arriving in Iceland with his family and dependents in 874. He built his farm in Reykjavík, the site of the present capital. During the next 60 years or so, Viking settlers from Scandinavia and also from Norse colonies in the British Isles—Ireland, Scotland and the Scottish Isles—settled in the country. There was therefore a Celtic element among the first inhabitants which has left few traces in the archaeological record, nor has it contributed more than a handful of words to the Icelandic language, which is Scandinavian dialect, more or less identical with the Viking Age Norse spoken in Western Norway, the Faroes, Shetland, Orkney, etc.

The settlement of Iceland may also be viewed in the context of the general Viking expansion of the period, plausibly linked to population pressure in Western Norway and increasing scarcity of farming land. Today it is estimated that 60% of the Icelandic population are descendants of people from Western Norway.

=== Emigration to America ===
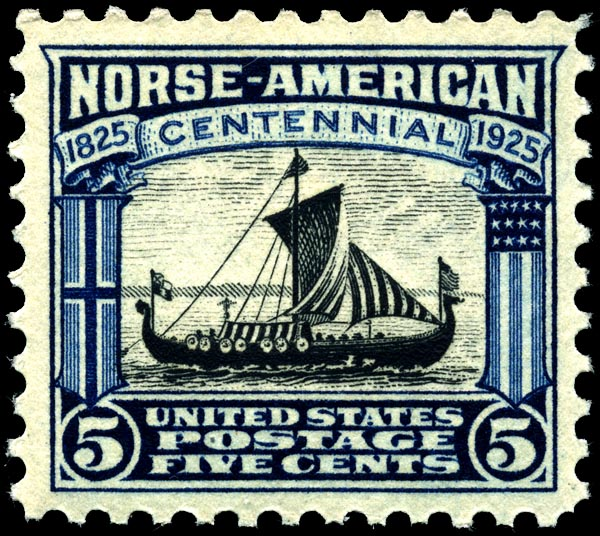
U.S. postage stamp featuring the ship Viking honoring the 100th anniversary of Norwegian immigration

For a century emigration was a central aspect of Norwegian history and more than 800,000 Norwegians emigrated to the United States. The first organized group of emigrants left Stavanger on the sloop Restoration on 4 July 1825. In 1837, Ægir left Bergen as the first ship with emigrants from Hordaland.

The Emigration Center of Western Norway is a memorial to those who left and to their descendants. The emigrant archives now include 96,000 names of emigrants from the two counties of Hordaland and Sogn og Fjordane up to 1924. This has been possible thanks to the work of many years by Jahn Sjursen, who has also collected books and other publications, pictures and objects related to Norwegian emigrants in the United States. He officially donated his collections to the Emigration Center at the opening in 1997. The Center continues to receive publications and objects for its collection. Access via the internet to the national digital records of emigrants from Norway to the United States has been developed by the University of Bergen and the Bergen Public Archives. The center's Emigrant Church was originally the Brampton Lutheran Church in Sargent County, North Dakota, built by Norwegian emigrants at the turn of the 19th century. The Brampton congregation was formed 1 July 1908. and 22 June 1996, the congregation donated their fully furnished church to the Emigration Center. It was taken down, transported to Sletta and reconstructed there by volunteers from Radøy. The church was reconsecrated by the Bishop of Bjørgvin, Ole Danholt Hagesæther, 6 July 1997.

== Geography ==
Geography of Western Norway
- Continent: Europe
- Region: Northern Europe
- Area
  - Total: 58,582 km^{2} (22,619 sq mi)
- Coastline: 26,592 km (16,524 mi)
- Borders: Norway
- Highest point: Store Skagastølstind; 2405 m
- Lowest point: North Sea; 0 m
- Largest lake: Blåsjø; 84,48 km^{2}

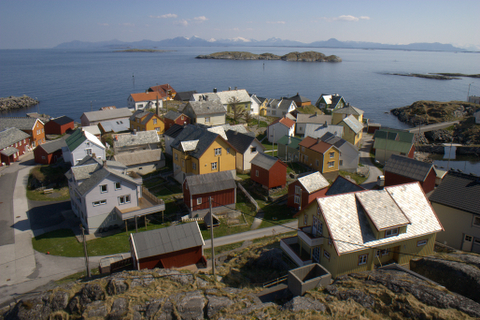
Ona is an island situated in Sandøy Municipality (now part of Ålesund Municipality) in the district of Romsdal.

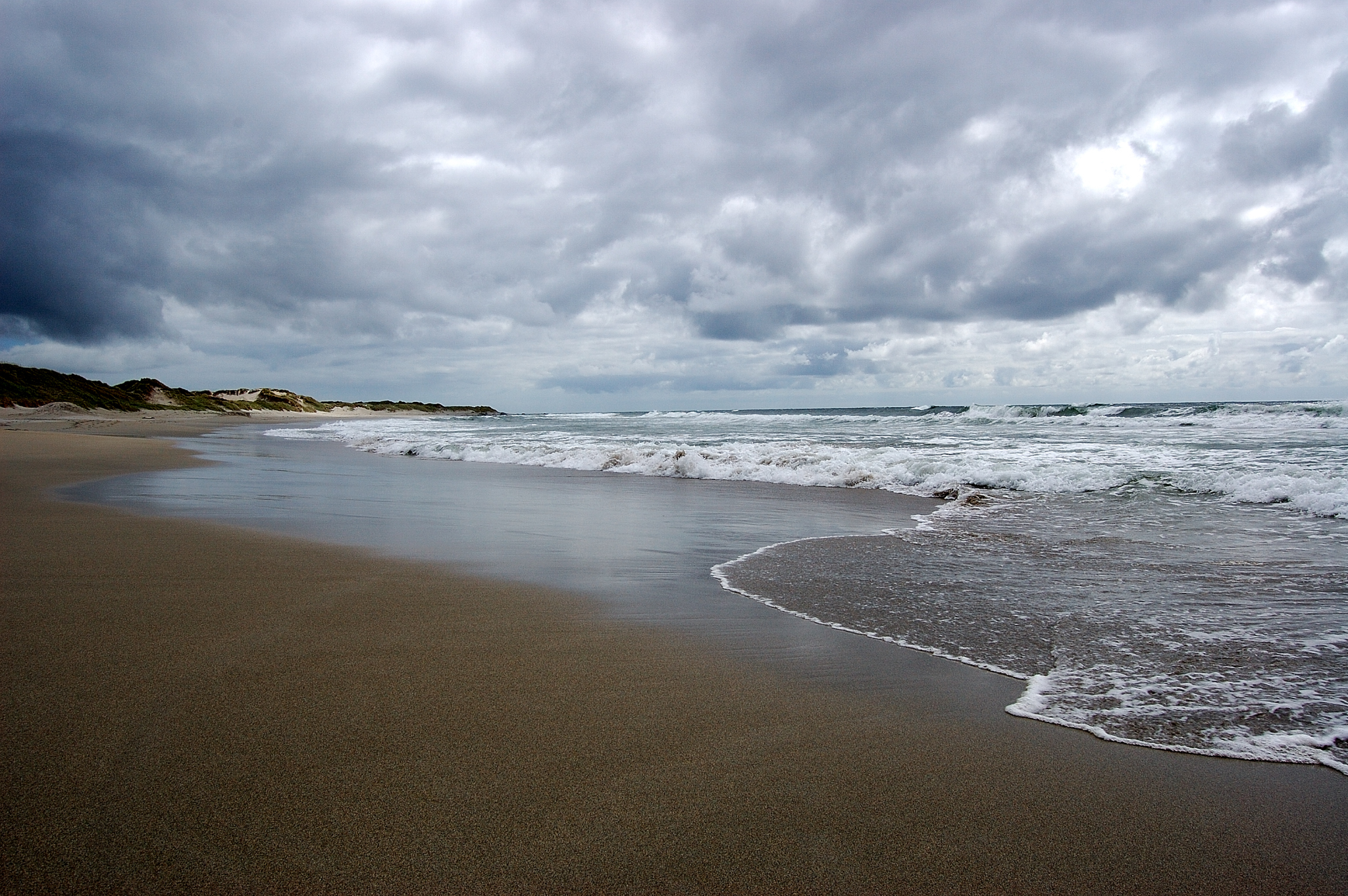
One of the many beaches along the Jæren coastline

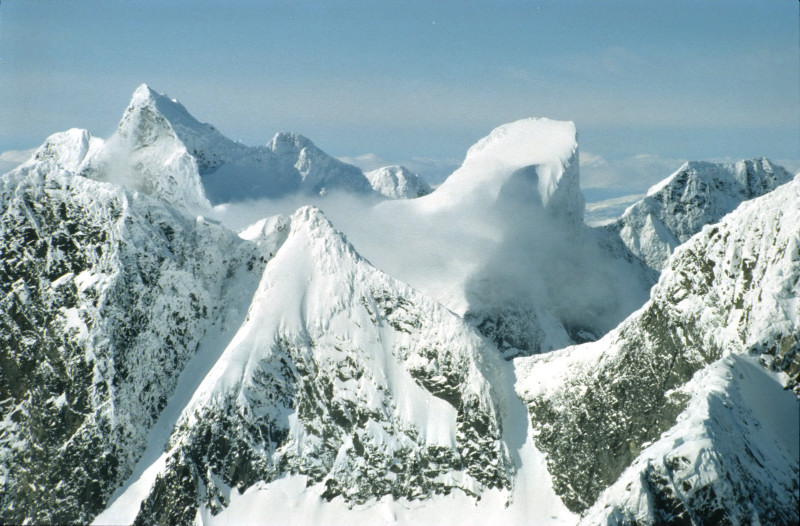
Hurrungane is a large mountainous area.

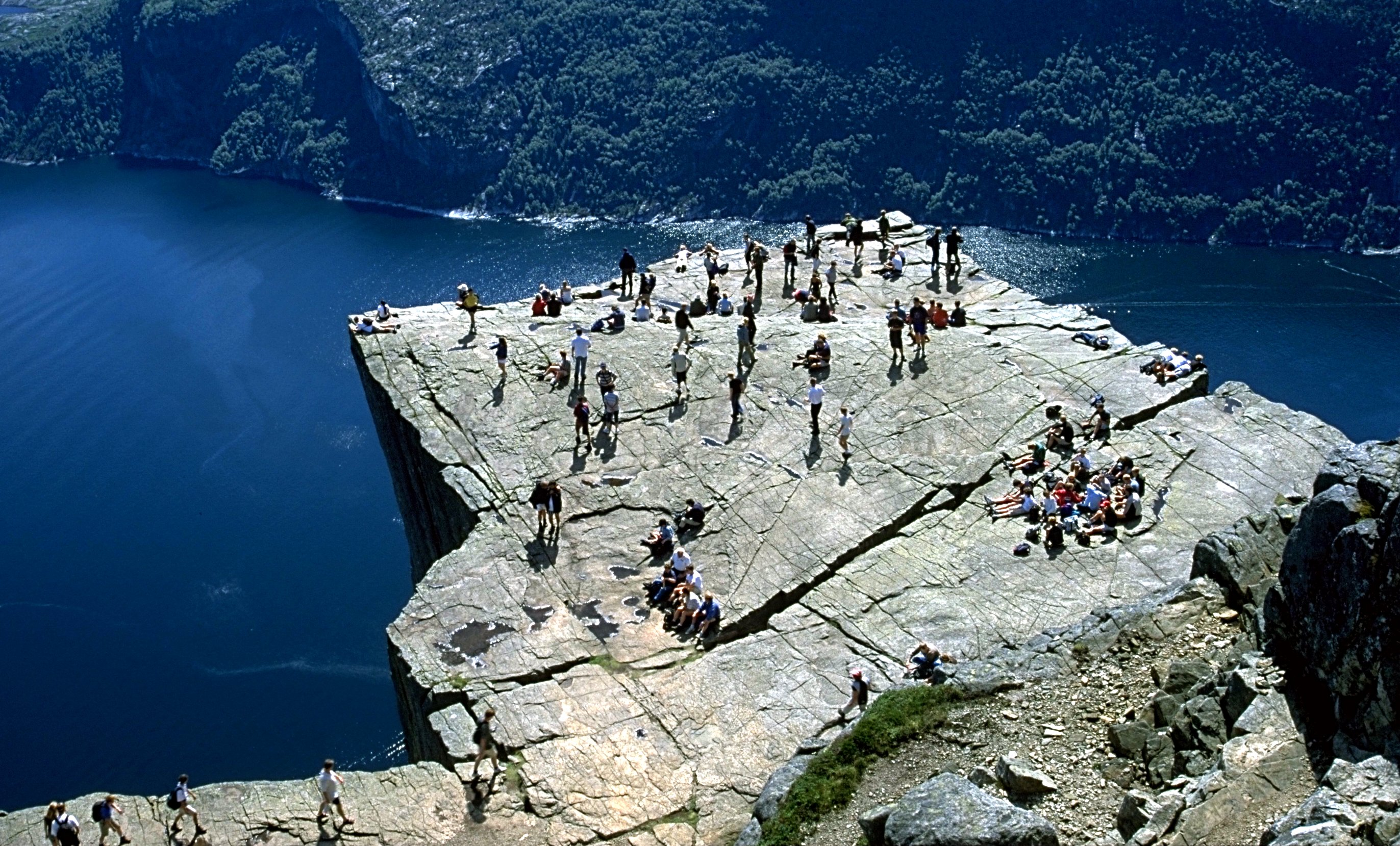
Preikestolen is a massive cliff 604 metres (1982 ft) above Lysefjorden, opposite the Kjerag plateau, in Strand Municipality.

Western Norway is the third largest region in Norway by area. It covers an area of 58,582 km^{2} (22,619 sq mi).

The United Kingdom and the Faroe Islands lie to the west across the North Sea, while Denmark lies south of its southern tip across the North Sea. It is 675 km (419 mi) from the Faroe Islands to Western Norway while Unst in the Shetland Islands is about 300 km (190 mi) away. Western Norway has a 26,592 km (16,524 mi) long coastline.

The southern part of the region is called Jæren. This is one of the major agricultural areas in Norway. Farms in other areas of Western Norway are often small. The total area of agricultural in Western Norway is 2 650 square kilometers, which is 5.3% of the total area in the region.

Western Norway is highly mountainous; in less than 10 kilometers from the Sognefjord, there are peaks that are over 2000 meters in height. The highest point is Store Skagastølstind (also known as Storen), which is 2,405 meters high. It is situated on the border between Luster Municipality and Årdal Municipality and is part of the Hurrungane range. The summit is a destination for mountaineers but is fairly difficult. First ascent by William Cecil Slingsby on 21 July 1876. There are a number of different routes, the most common being Heftye's renne (Heftye's couloir). Another route of ascent is via Andrew's renne (Andrew's couloir), first ascent A. W. Andrews and party in 1899. Store Skagastølstind and the mountaineering of the late 19th century in Norway is traditionally linked to the historical hotel Turtagrø.

There are many fjords in Western Norway, Hardangerfjorden, Boknafjorden and Sognefjorden are the longest. The Sognefjord (Sognefjorden) is the largest fjord in Norway, and the second longest in the world, after Scoresby Sund on Greenland. Located in Vestland county it stretches 205 km (127 mi) inland to the small village of Skjolden.

Providing the most spectacular fjord and mountain scenery in Norway, the region has been a tourist mecca for centuries. Except for the Jæren plain located at the extreme southern end of the region, Vestlandet is mountainous, with the Jotunheim Mountains and the Hardanger Plateau being the highest areas. The Jostedals Glacier, the largest glacier in Europe, is located in the north-central part of the region, while Hardanger Icecap (Hardangerjøkulen) and the Folgefonna Glacier are smaller ice fields in the south. Norway's longest fjord, Sogn Fjord (205 km [127 mi]), located in the central part of the region, nearly divides Vestlandet in two; farther south Hardanger Fjord stretches inland for 179 km (111 mi). Many waterfalls flow into the fjords, with the Syv Systre, Toka Gorge, and Vørings Falls (Vøringsfossen) among the best known. The rugged coastline is protected by thousands of offshore islands in a nearly continuous line. Occasionally, the northern parts of Møre og Romsdal are considered to be part of Trøndelag.

=== Statistics ===
Map references: Europe

Area:
total: 58,582 km^{2}

Area – comparative: slightly larger than Croatia, but slightly smaller than West Virginia.

Coastline: 26,592 km

Maritime claims:
contiguous zone: 10 nmi (18.5 km; 11.5 mi)
continental shelf: 200 nmi (370.4 km; 230.2 mi)
exclusive economic zone: 200 nmi (370.4 km; 230.2 mi)
territorial sea: 12 nmi (22.2 km; 13.8 mi)

=== Physical geography ===
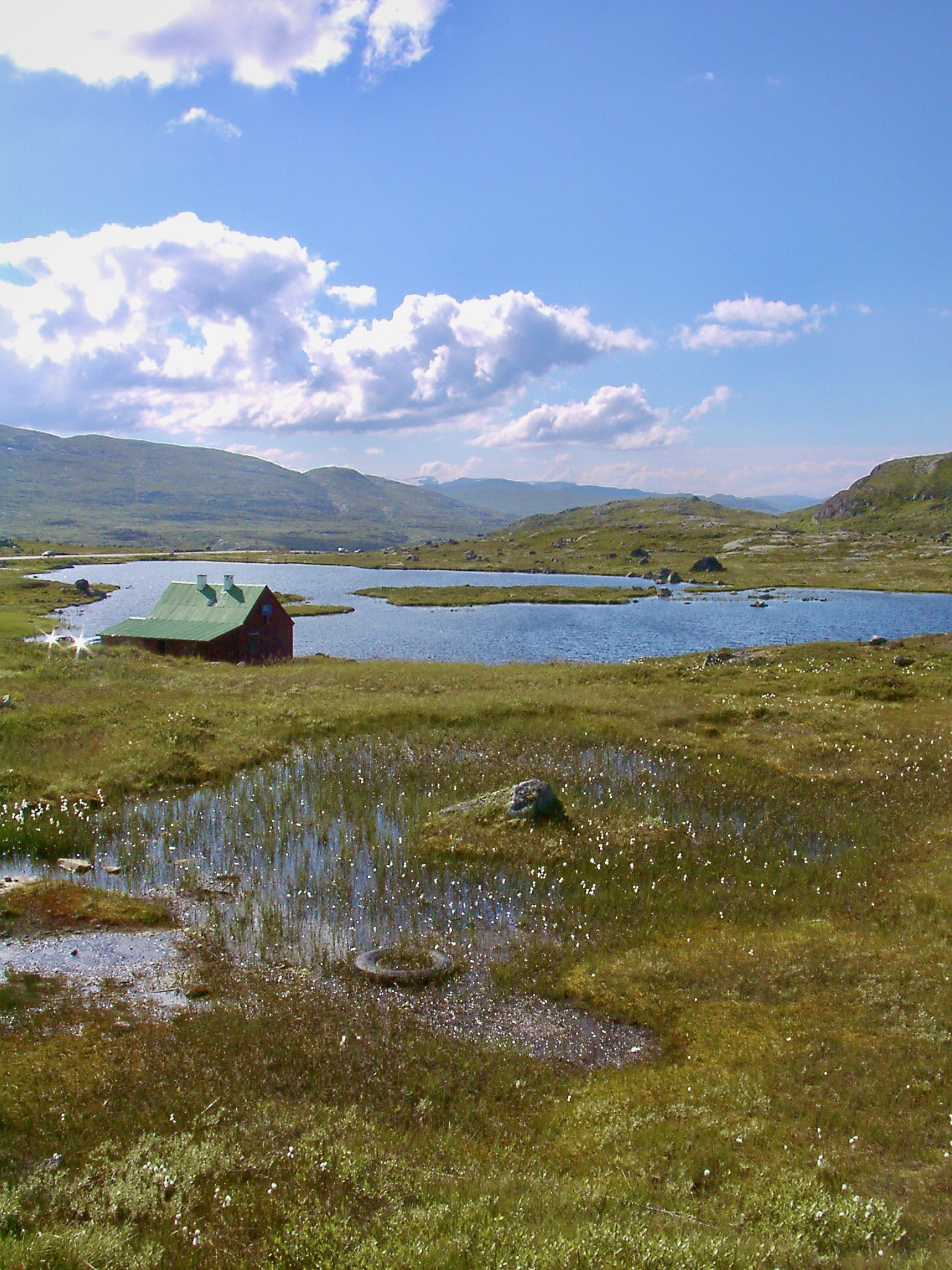
Hardangervidda National Park

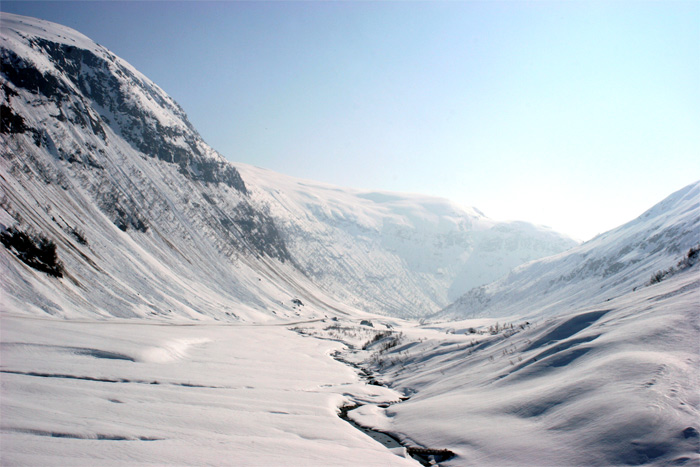
The inland valleys used to have reliable snow cover in winter.

Rivers running westward acquired tremendous erosive power. Following fracture lines marking weaknesses in the Earth's crust, they dug out gorges and canyons that knifed deep into the jagged coast. To the east the land sloped more gently, and broader valleys were formed. During repeated periods of glaciation in the Great Ice Age of the Quaternary Period (i.e., about the last 2.6 million years), the scouring action of glaciers tonguing down the V-shaped valleys that were then part of the landscape created the magnificent U-shaped drowned fjords that now grace the western coast of Norway. Enormous masses of soil, gravel, and stone were also carried by glacial action as far south as present-day Denmark and northern Germany. The bedrock, exposed in about 40 percent of the area, was scoured and polished by the movements of these materials.

From the southernmost point a swelling complex of ranges, collectively called Langfjellene, runs northward to divide eastern Norway, or Østlandet, from western Norway. The narrow coastal zone of Vestlandet has many islands, and steep-walled, narrow fjords cut deep into the interior mountain region. The major exception is the wide Jæren Plain, south of Stavanger.

Glaciation and other forces wore down the surface and created thick sandstone, conglomerate, and limestone deposits known as sparagmite. Numerous extensive areas called peneplains, whose relief has been largely eroded away, also were formed. Remains of these include the Hardanger Plateau—1,100 m (3,600 ft) above sea level—Europe's largest mountain plateau, covering about 6,500 km^{2} (2,500 sq mi).

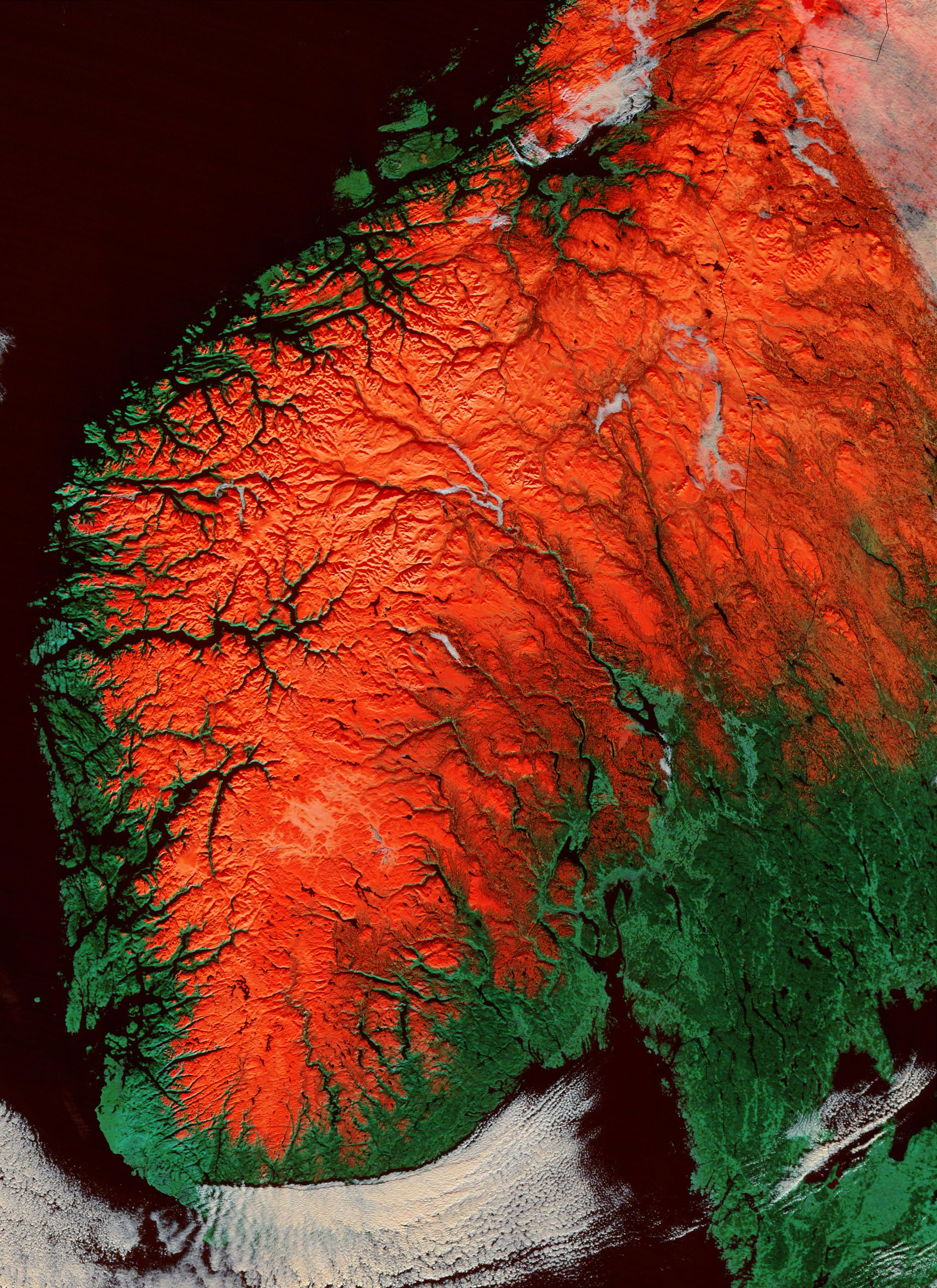
A satellite image of South Norway with snow shown as red highlights the terrain. Especially the fjords Sognefjorden and Hardangerfjorden are clearly visible.

=== Terrain ===
Glaciated; mostly high plateaus and rugged mountains broken by fertile valleys; small, scattered plains; coastline deeply indented by fjords. Frozen ground all-year can also be found in the higher mountain areas. Numerous glaciers are still found in Western Norway.

Elevation extremes:
lowest point: North Sea 0 m
highest point: Store Skagastølstind 2,405 m

=== Geology ===
The fjords of western Norway formed in connection to the east-ward tilting of much of Norway during the Cenozoic uplift of the Scandinavian Mountains. This uplift, that occurred long before the Quaternary glaciations, enabled rivers to incise deeply the Paleic relief. A study of Sognefjord suggest that the fluvial and glacial erosion that made the fjords has followed structural weaknesses in the crust. The headvalleys in particular seem to located at structural weakness zones. Western Norway bears some resemblance to other passive margins at lower latitudes like eastern Australia. In both cases a table land is dissected by valleys forming a great escarpment. The main differences is that in Norway valley and fjord bottoms have been widened by glacier erosion, valley sides steepened, and the outer regions of valleys straightened, also by glacier erosion.

The deglaciation patterns of the Bergen and Nordfjord–Sunnmøre areas in western Norway are described and correlated. In the Bergen area the coast was first deglaciated at 12,600 B.P., with a succeeding re-advance into the North Sea around 12,200 B.P. Later, during the Allerød, the inland ice retreated at least 50 km, but nearly reached the sea again during the Younger Dryas re-advance, ending at 10,000 B.P. Sunnmøre was ice-free during an interstadial 28,000–38,000 B.P. Later the inland ice reached the sea. The final deglaciation is poorly dated in Sunnmøre, while further south in Nordfjord, it started slightly before 12,300 B.P., followed by a major retreat. No large re-advance of the inland ice occurred during the Younger Dryas. However, in the Sunnmøre–Nordfjord area many local glaciers formed outside the inland ice during the Younger Dryas. Limnic sediments outside one such cirque glacier have been cored and dated, proving that the glacier did not exist at 12,300–11,000 B.P., and that it was formed and disappeared in the time interval 11,000–10,000 B.P. (Younger Dryas). The erosion rate of the cirque glacier was 0.9 mm/year.

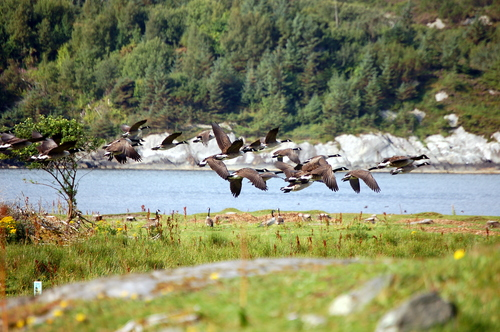
The nature reserve at the island of Herdla has many birds. Some 220 species of birds are registered.

=== Flora and fauna ===
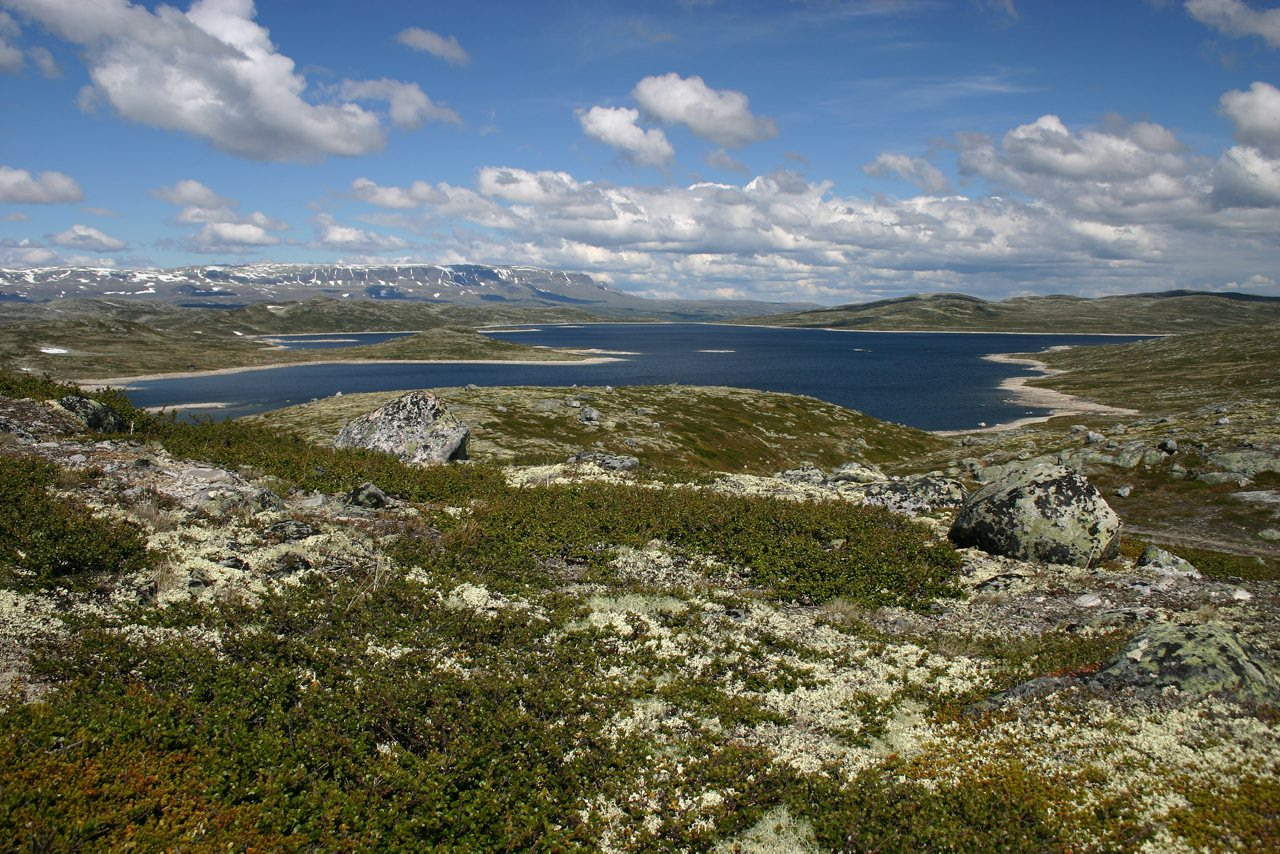
Hardangervidda landscape

Western Norway has similar flora and fauna as the rest of Norway, but there are some major differences. While almost all red deer in Norway are found here, there are few moose. Reindeer are a common sight on the Hardangervidda and in other large mountain areas. The whole of the Hardangervidda is above the tree line. Its alpine climate means that many species of Arctic animals and plants are found here, further south than anywhere else in Europe. Its wild reindeer herds are among the largest in the world, with some 15,000 animals recorded in 1996 and about 8,000 in 2008. They migrate across the plateau during the year, moving from their winter grazing lands on the east side of the Hardangervidda, where they graze on lichen, to their breeding grounds in the more fertile west of the plateau.

30,000 years ago glaciers covered vast areas of the Northern Hemisphere. As so much water was trapped on land, in the form of glacial ice, the sea lay 120 metres below its present level. This meant that the North Sea was dry land, a treeless tundra, with long, winding rivers, endless stretches of boggy land and wide, sandy heaths. Only as far south as the Mediterranean and the Black Sea were there any forests.

As the climate slowly improved and the Scandinavian Peninsula rose from the grip of the ice, plants and animals started to invade the new territory. As soon as there was dry land the first plants took root and with them came animals, birds and insects. The first of these were the Arctic animals such as wild reindeer, Arctic fox and wolverine (glutton), who followed the edge of the glacier up to the mountains. The trees came later, accompanied by a rich flora and fauna including bears, elk, marten, fox, hare, European beaver and otter.

This influx reached its climax around 3000 BC when the climate improved considerably, giving rise to the postglacial period of warmth. The average temperature rose 3 degrees. This may not sound very much, but in the mountains the tree line rises about 100 metres up the mountainside for each degree M so the consequences were dramatic. Most of the mountains of Western Norway which today occupy about three quarters of the land mass M became covered with dense forests of pine and birch. The glaciers had thawed and vanished, and extensive oak forests, not unlike those we see today in Central Europe, spread over the low-lying land. Life was hard for the animals and plants in the high mountains, as they were pressed up towards the highest peaks, which rose like islands from a sea of forest.

Along the west coast the winter is mild and snowfalls rare. Here are a number of the plants which cannot tolerate frost, for example the star hyacinth (scilla verna) and the purple heather (erica purpurea), which are otherwise only found in England, Ireland and further south. A little further inland we come upon the species which can withstand short periods of frost and snow in winter. These are found both a little further north, and in the fjords. Typical examples are the foxglove (digitalis purpurea) and the holly (ilex aquifolium), which in Norway grow only in the southwest.

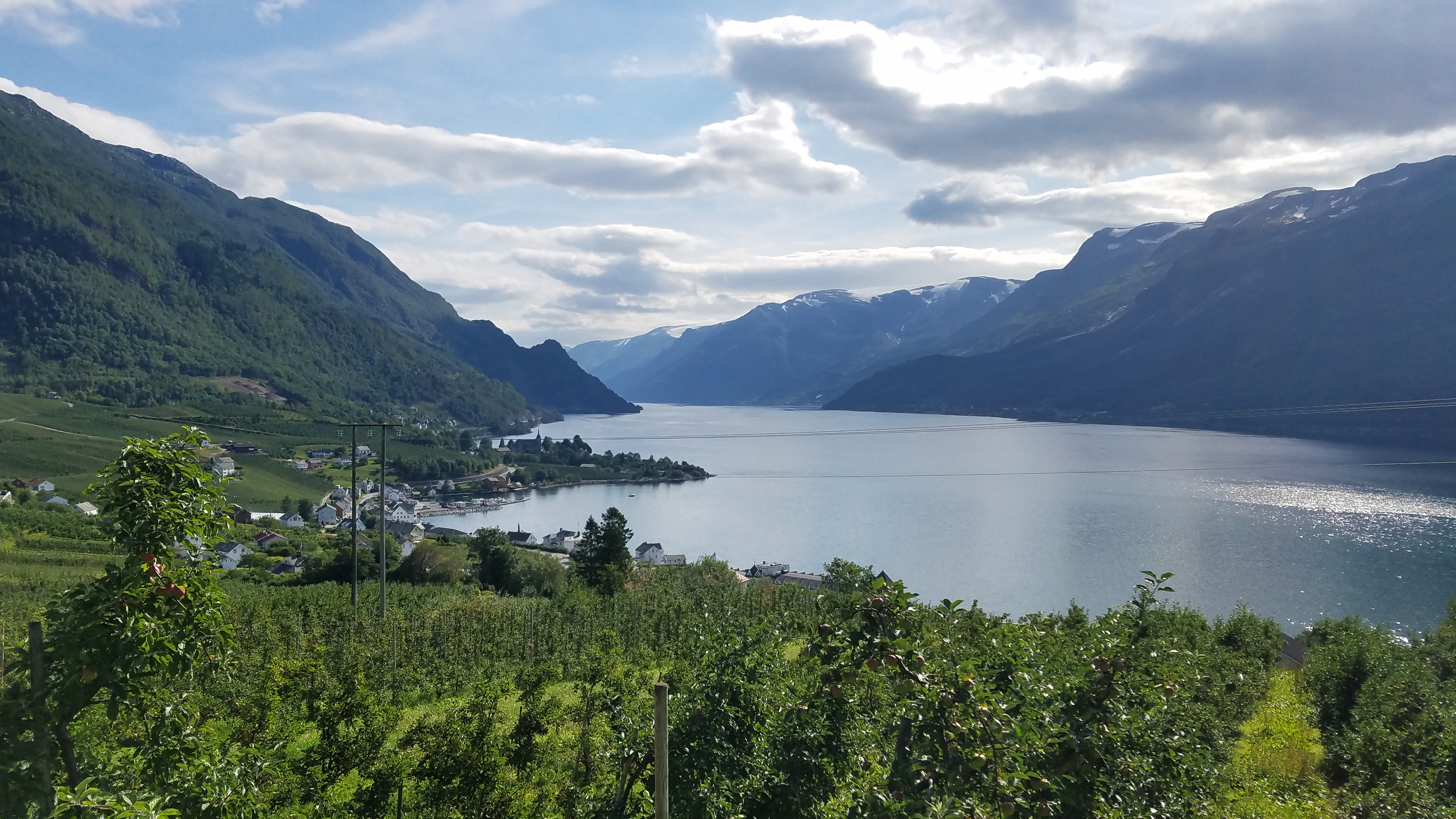
Hardanger is one of Norway's most important sources of fruit and constitutes approximately 40% of the national fruit production, including apple, plum, pear, cherry and redcurrant.

== Climate ==
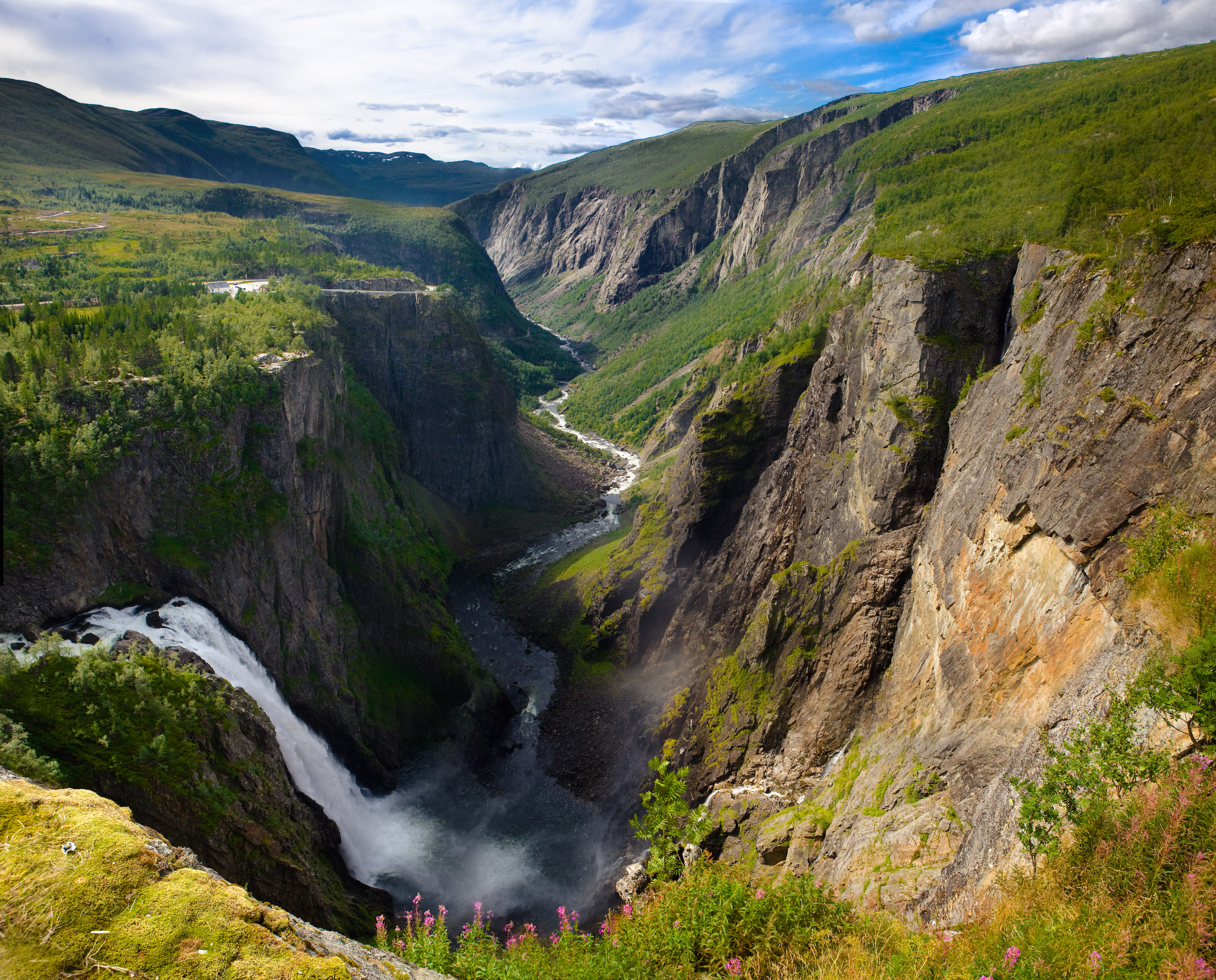
Vøringsfossen waterfall in Eidfjord Municipality

Western Norway is one of the wettest regions in Europe, with precipitation in the mountains near the coast of about 3,500 mm per year on average, and exceeding 5,000 mm in peak years. In Bergen city the average precipitation is 2,250 mm per year [1]. The wet climate is partly due to the Gulf Stream, which also gives this region a milder winter than other parts of Norway, with rain being more common than snow in the winter.

=== Summer ===
Late June to early August is when summer is at its peak. This is when the weather is at its most stable and warmest with sunny, long and bright days. It is not unusual with temperatures reaching 25 °C (77 °F) and above.

=== Autumn ===
During the course of September the landscape is painted in golden colours. Red clusters of rowan berries hang on naked branches. Autumn also means harvest time along the fjords.

=== Winter ===
Gales, rain and cloud are likely along the west coast and the rainfall is frequent and heavy. Thanks to the warming Gulf Stream, the Norwegian fjords enjoy a relatively mild climate and remain virtually ice-free even during the winter. Skiing conditions in the mountainous areas of Western Norway are highly favourable in wintertime, beginning usually in November.

=== Spring ===
During springtime the colours of vegetation in the landscape burst forth with the warmth of the sun. Orchards of flowering fruit trees can be seen along the Hardangerfjord in May.

== Economy ==
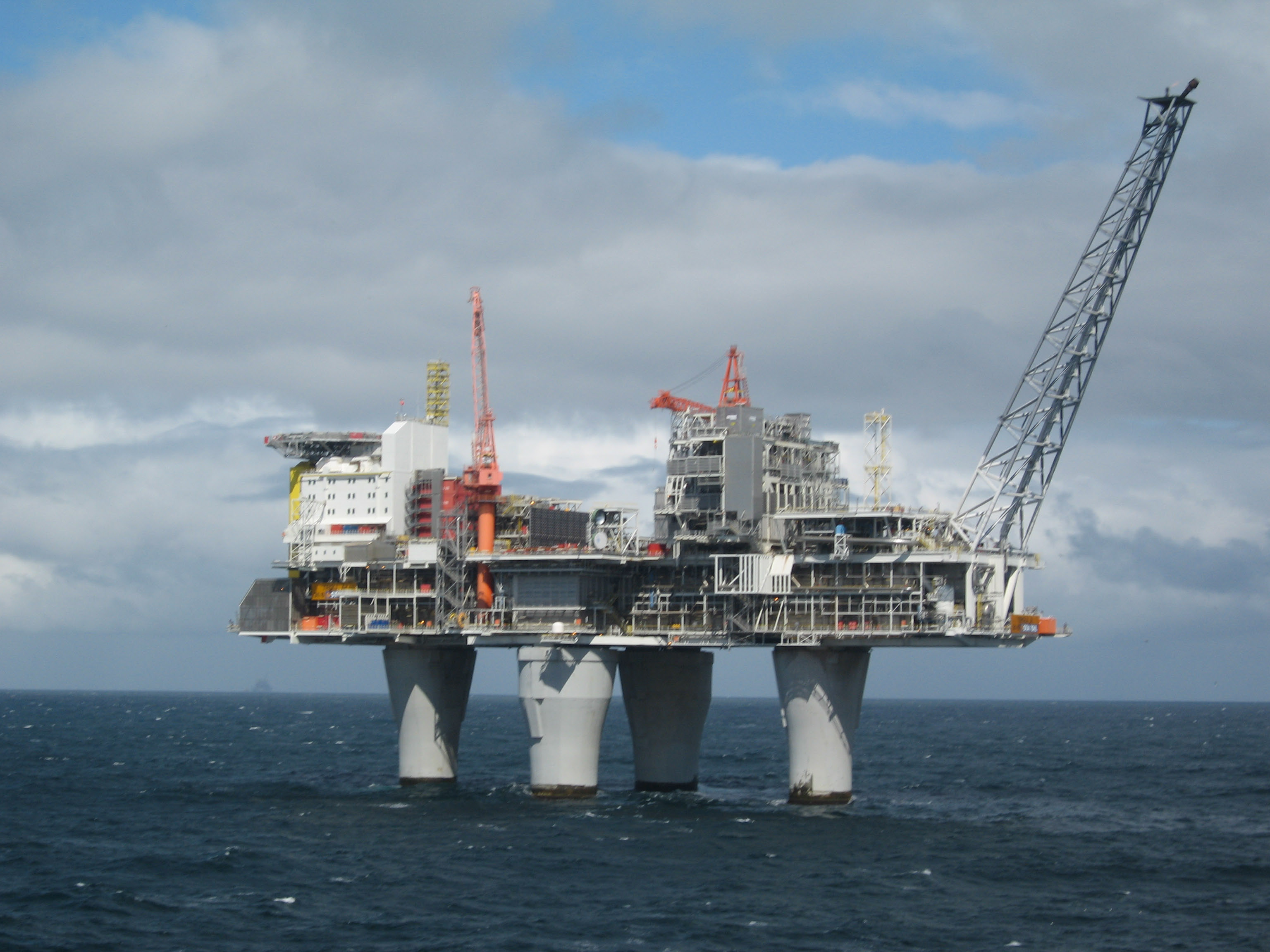
Troll gas field is a natural gas and oil field in the Norwegian sector of the North Sea, 100 km (62 mi) North-West of Bergen, 50 km (31 mi) west of the island of Fedje.

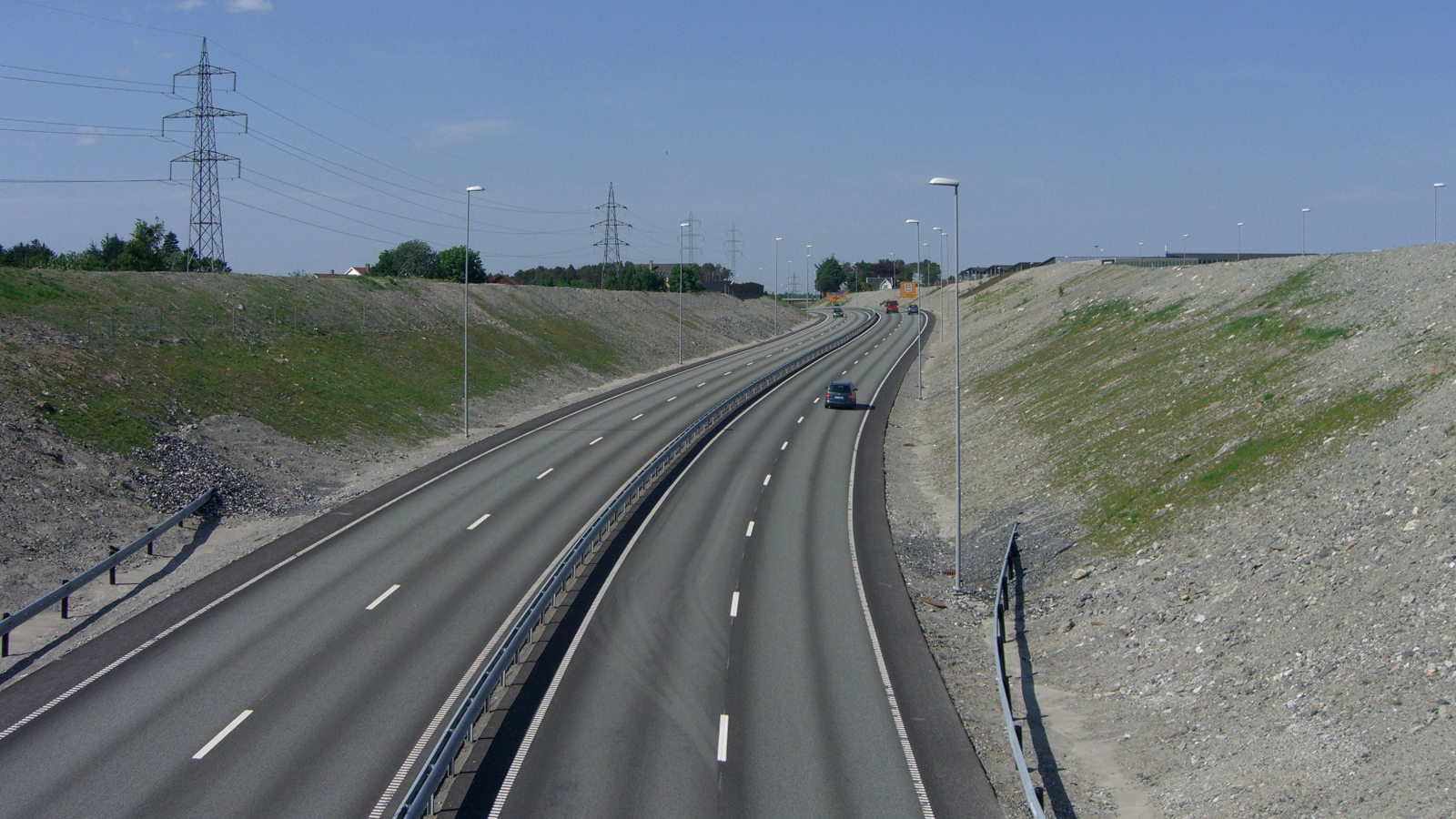
A motorvei (highway) in Sandnes Municipality

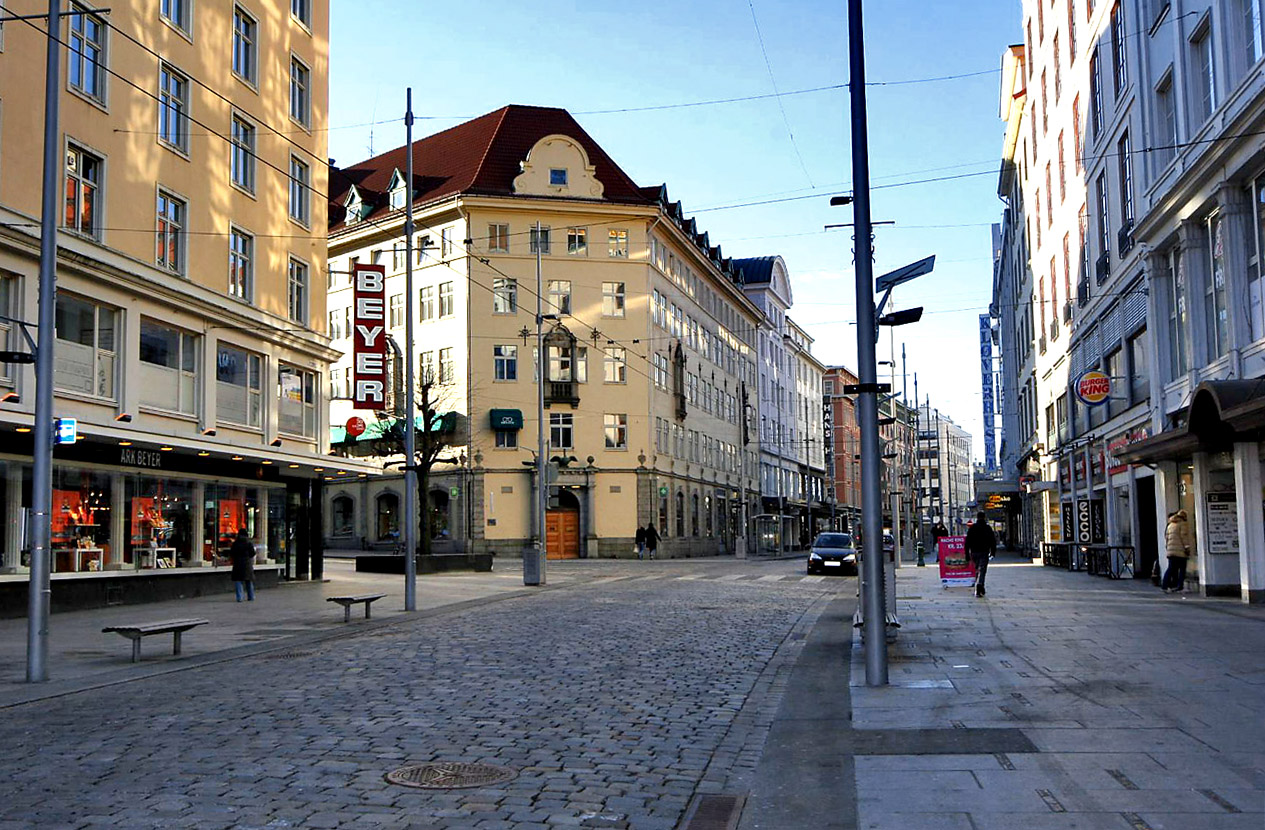
Strandgaten is a shopping street in Bergen.

Western Norway is rich in natural resources. Today Stavanger is the oil capital of Norway. Before petroleum, fishing and agriculture were the most important economic activities in Western Norway. Some areas of Western Norway such as Jæren, Karmøy, Vindafjord, Voss, Sunnfjord and Hustadvika comprise a rich agricultural area. The inland fjord areas of Hardanger are sheltered, with rich fruit districts specializing in apples and cherries.

Stavanger Municipality is a leading industrial area in Western Norway. Ålesund Municipality contains many engineering firms, and the bulk of Norway's furniture industry.

Along the coast fishing plays the same role that forestry does elsewhere. At the same time, it forms the basis of a large fish-processing industry and offers seasonal employment for many farmers. Of all fishermen only half fish as their sole occupation. Most vessels are owned by the fishermen themselves, the necessary crew members being paid by shares of gross income in a continuation of a centuries-old tradition of the sea. A critical problem is how to avoid depleting the fish resources while maintaining the volume. About half the catch goes into fish meal and oil, but some is processed for human consumption in freezing plants. In the northwest the city of Ålesund thrives on fishing. Ålesund is one of the world's largest and most important ports for cod.

By the mid-1990s Norway had become the world's second largest oil exporter (behind Saudi Arabia). The first commercially important discovery of petroleum on Norway's continental shelf was made at the Ekofisk field in the North Sea late in 1969, just as foreign oil companies were about to give up after four years of exploratory drilling. Intensified exploration increased reserves faster than production. Nevertheless, by the mid-1990s about half of export earnings and nearly one-tenth of government revenues came from offshore oil and gas, and these revenues continued to increase as the end of the century approached. It was estimated that the high rate of oil production could be sustained at least into the second decade of the 21st century, while that of natural gas was projected to increase dramatically and be sustained much longer.

More than one-fourth of the huge investment made in Norwegian offshore operations by the mid-1990s went toward the development of the Troll gas field just west of Bergen, one of the largest offshore gas fields ever found. Its development ranked as one of the world's largest energy projects. With a water displacement of one million tons and a height of nearly 1,550 feet (475 m), the Troll A platform was the tallest concrete structure ever moved when it was towed into place in 1995. Gas deliveries from the Troll field made Norway a leading supplier of natural gas to continental Europe.

== Demographics ==
Historical population
Year	Pop.	±%
1769	193,259	—
1801	230,053	+19.0%
1855	392,588	+70.7%
1900	560,765	+42.8%
1950	811,411	+44.7%
1960	887,537	+9.4%
1970	961,676	+8.4%
1980	1,033,902	+7.5%
1990	1,089,763	+5.4%
2000	1,159,176	+6.4%
2010	1,263,464	+9.0%
2020?	1,397,393	+10.6%
2030?	1,525,853	+9.2%
Source: Statistics Norway .

Western Norway has one of the fastest-growing regions of Norway: in 2009 its rate of population growth was 1.44%, while that of the country as a whole was 1.20%. The population on 1 January 2010 was 1,263,464. 37.7% of the population lived in Hordaland, 33.8% in Rogaland, 19.8% in Møre og Romsdal, and 8.4% in Sogn og Fjordane. 60% of the population was under 40 years old, and 30% was under the age of 20. Many of the historical immigrants in Western Norway came from countries like Scotland, England, Netherlands, Germany, Denmark and Sweden, and Western Norway is still the region which has received the most immigration from the Western world.

Year old	0–14	15–64	65–	Total
Population	251,499	830,712	181,253	1,263,464
Percent (%)	19.9	65.8	14.3	100

Country of origin	Norway	Immigrants	Eastern Europe	Asia	Western Europe	Africa	Nordic countries	Latin America	North America	Oceania	Total
Population	1,148,324	115,140	35,913	33,154	16,726	11,085	10,103	5,082	2,588	489	1,263,464

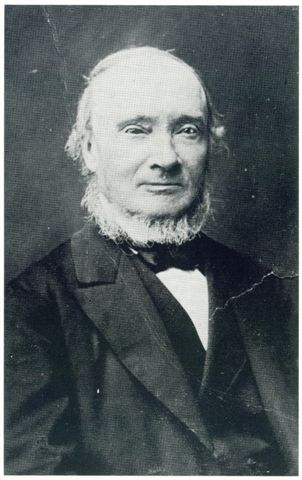
Ivar Aasen came from Ørsta Municipality in Sunnmøre. He was the father of Nynorsk and price influence on its derivative, Høgnorsk.

=== Language ===
Western Norway is also notable for the extensive use of the Nynorsk variant of the Norwegian language: Most Nynorsk users (87%) live in Western Norway. Nevertheless, a majority (56%) of the inhabitants of the region use Bokmål, as it predominates in the cities. In Sogn og Fjordane, outside of the larger cities the use of Nynorsk is nearly universal (97%), and the users of Nynorsk are also a majority (54%) in Møre og Romsdal. But in Hordaland and Rogaland users of Nynorsk are a minority (42% and 26%, respectively). These percentages would be higher if the numbers excluded the northern areas of Møre og Romsdal and the southern areas of Rogaland. Every municipality in Sogn og Fjordane, Sunnmøre (except Ålesund Municipality), Hordaland (except Bergen Municipality and Askøy Municipality) and Ryfylke (except Strand Municipality and Kvitsøy Municipality) has selected Nynorsk as the official written language form.

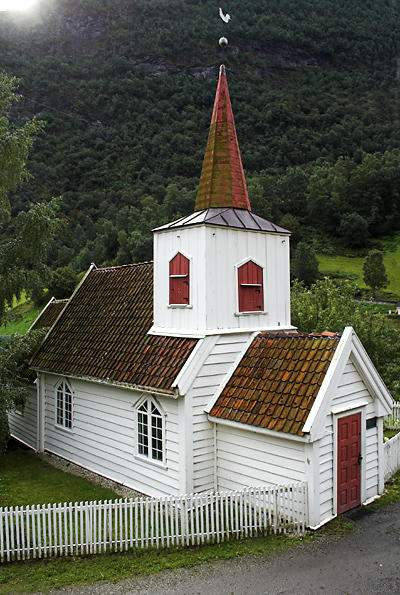
Undredal Stave Church

In many cases Nynorsk is more similar to Icelandic than Bokmål:

- Bokmål: Jeg kommer fra Norge. Jeg snakker norsk.
- Nynorsk: Eg kjem frå Noreg. Eg talar norsk.
- Danish: Jeg kommer fra Norge. Jeg taler norsk.
- Swedish: Jag kommer från Norge. Jag talar norska.
- Faroese: Eg komi frá Noreg. Eg tosi norskt.
- Icelandic: Ég kem frá Noregi. Ég tala norsku.
- English: I come from Norway. I speak Norwegian.

=== Religion ===
Religion in Western Norway
religion	percent
Christianity	87.55%
Islam	0.92%
Buddhism	0.19%
Other	11.34%

Christianity is the largest religion of the region, as in the rest of Norway. 1,050,559 people are members of the Church of Norway. There are also 55,621 members in other Christian churches. Islam has 11,655 adherents in Western Norway. Buddhism has 2,452 members. 1,557 are from Baháʼí Faith, Judaism, Sikhism and other related religions. Religion is often more important for inhabitants of Western Norway than elsewhere in the country.

==== Bible Belt ====
The name Bible Belt has been applied historically to the Southern and Western parts of Norway. The region thus defined included most of Western Norway, especially Rogaland, Møre og Romsdal and some parts of Hordaland. In these areas the conservative branch of the Church of Norway has a stronghold and the members usually associate themselves to Indremisjonen (Inner Mission). There are also numerous Pentecostals and members of the Free Churches, but these movements are also strongly represented in the rest of the country. The Bible Belt in Norway traditionally reflects the support for the Christian Democratic Party. However, especially since the first decade of the 21st century, conservative Christians unhappy with the more liberal development of the party have increasingly turned to the Progress Party. Notably absent from the Bible Belt are larger cities like Bergen and Stavanger, where many people identify themselves as non-religious or with other religions.

===== Buckle =====
Several locations are occasionally referred to as the "Buckle of the Bible Belt":

- Bømlo Municipality, one of the first area in Norway who were Christianized. Christianity has a strong influence among the inhabitants and many prominent Norwegian Christians were born here, including the previous leader of the Christian Democratic Party, Knut Arild Hareide. Among the younger population, charismatic movements are popular. Many Christian gatherings have also been held here.
- Kvitsøy Municipality, a municipality where 28.7% of the population vote for the Christian Democratic Party in the 2009 Norwegian parliamentary election and it is therefore the dominant party. The party has also an important stronghold with more than 15% votes in Bjerkreim, Bømlo, Fedje, Finnøy, Fitjar, Forsand, Giske, Gjesdal, Hjelmeland, Hå, Karmøy, Lund, Sokndal, Strand, and Time,

== Education ==
Bergen has one university, the University of Bergen, and one university college, Bergen University College, with a total of 22,000 students and 3,600 staff. With approximately 16,000 students and 3,000 staff, the University of Bergen (Norwegian: Universitetet i Bergen) is the third largest university in Norway, after the University of Oslo and the Norwegian University of Science and Technology. Although it was founded as late as 1946, academic activity had been taking place at Bergen Museum since 1825. The university's academic profile focuses on marine research and co-operation with developing countries. In 2002, the university was awarded three national centres of excellence in climate research, petroleum research and medieval studies. In December 2004, billionaire Trond Mohn donated 250 million NOK to the university as research funding. In addition, he has given the university several individual gifts of 50 million NOK. Bergen University College (Norwegian: Høgskolen i Bergen) is one of 24 state-owned university colleges in Norway. As of 2007, it has approximately 6,000 students and 600 staff. The university college offers studies directed towards specific professions. The college is organised in 3 faculties: the Faculty of Education, the Faculty of Engineering, and the Faculty of Health and Social Sciences.

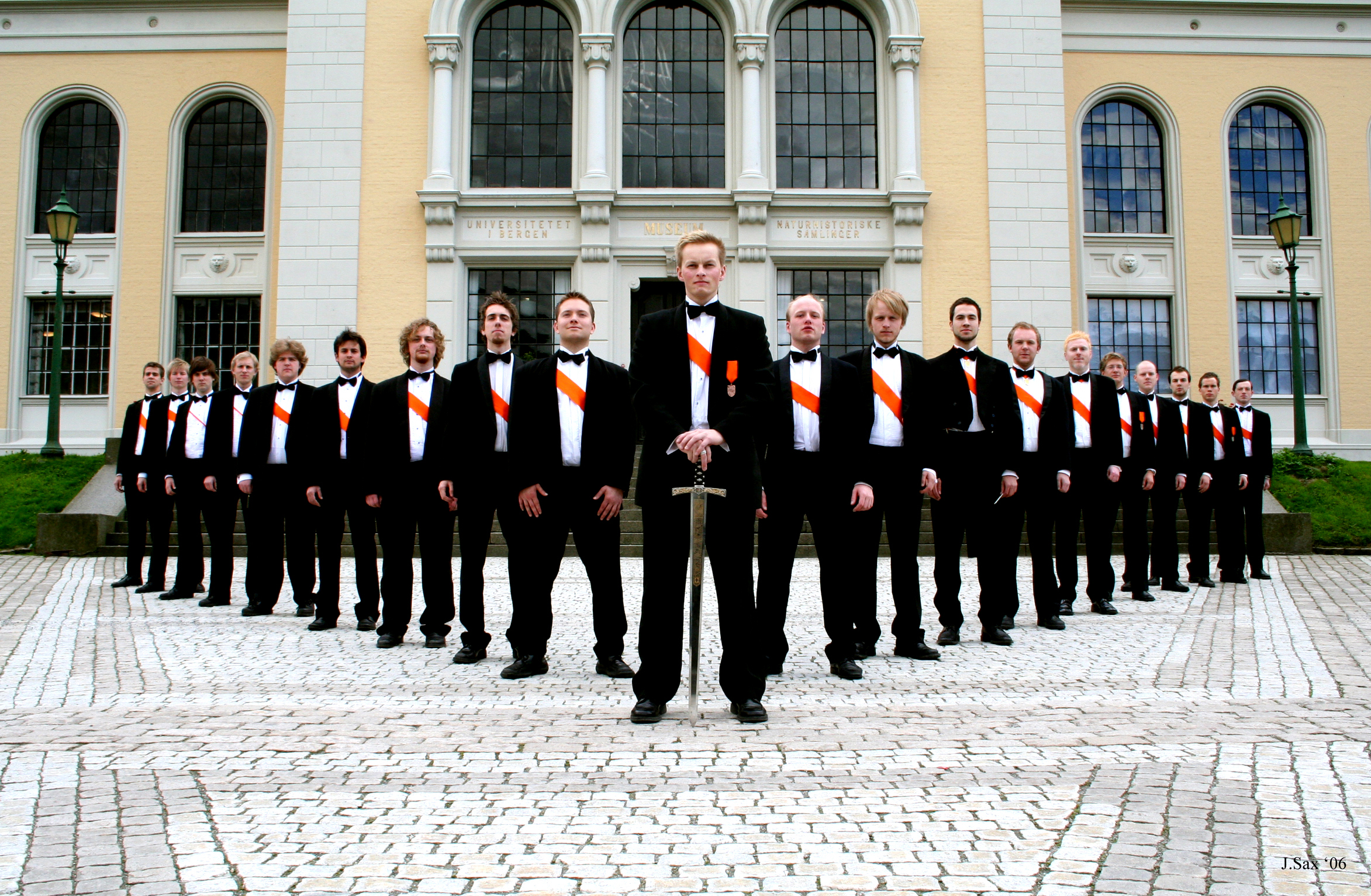
The Male Choir of the University of Bergen, a student organisation

The Norwegian School of Economics and Business Administration (Norwegian: Norges Handelshøyskole) is a leading school of business and economics in Norway. Finn E. Kydland, the most recent (2004) of three Norwegian laureates of the Economy Nobel Prize, has studied and lectured at the school. The school has approximately 2,700 students and 350 staff. As the result of a resolution passed by the Norwegian storting in 1917, the school was founded in 1936 as the first business school in Norway. As of 2007, the school's MSc programme is ranked by the Financial Times as the 36th best in Europe. The Bergen School of Architecture (Bergen Arkitekt Skole), founded in 1986 by architect Svein Hatløy, has alternative programs, with graduates like 3RW arkitekter and Tommie Wilhemsen. The Bergen National Academy of the Arts (Kunsthøgskolen i Bergen, approximately 300 students and 100 staff) is one of the two independent institutions of higher learning in the visual arts and design in Norway. Students can take a three-year bachelor's degree and a two-year master's degree in the following areas: Visual Art, Interior Architecture, Furniture Design, Room Design, Visual Communications, Photography, Printmaking, Ceramics and Textiles. The Naval Academy (Sjøkrigsskolen) of the Royal Norwegian Navy is located at Laksevåg in Bergen.

Stavanger has several schools for the expatriate community including the British International School of Stavanger and the International School of Stavanger. Stavanger has one university, the University of Stavanger with about 8,000 students. The university was formerly a university college. It was granted status as University on 1 January 2005. The population of Stavanger has a high percentage of university educated persons, with 31.3% of those above the age of 16 having higher education, compared to the national average of 24.2% (2006 figures).

=== Institutions ===
==== Universities ====
Traditionally there was only one university in Western Norway, located in Bergen (1948). Since 2005 any college offering five master programs and four doctoral programs can title itself a university, leading to the Stavanger University College converting to a university.

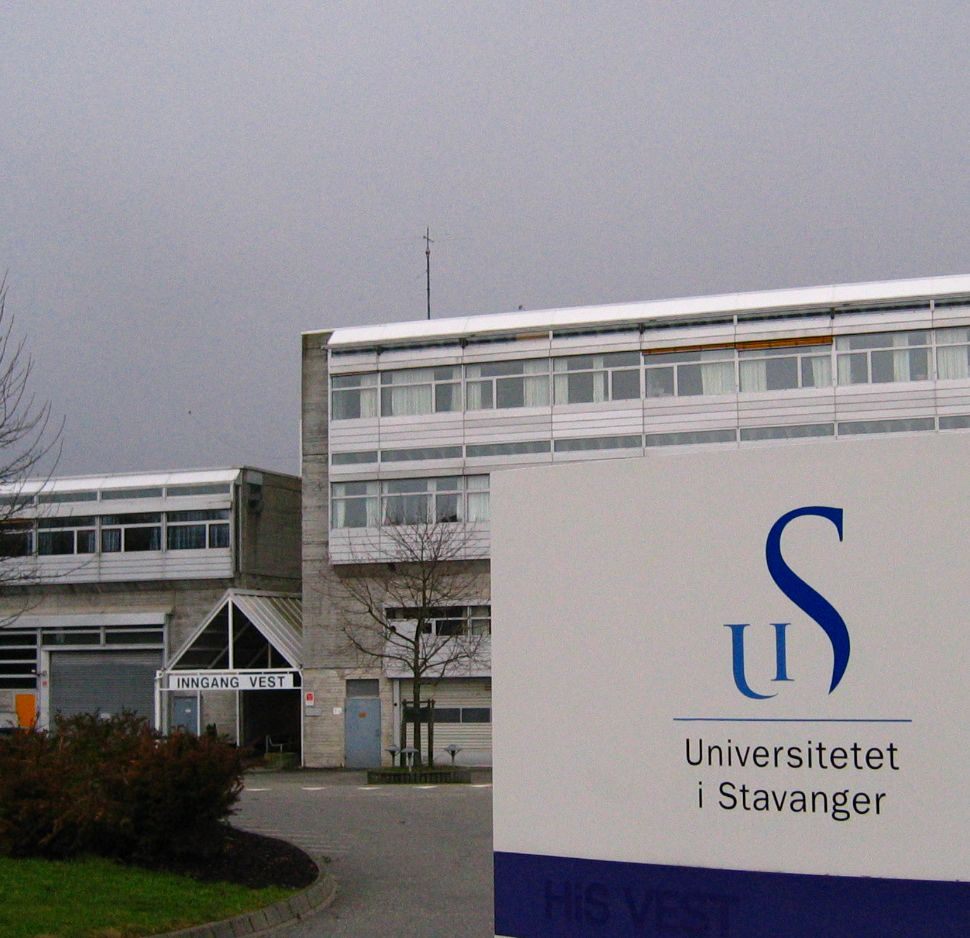
Entrance and sign of the University of Stavanger

The public universities of Western Norway are:

- University of Bergen
- University of Stavanger
- Western Norway University of Applied Sciences

Currently there are no private universities in Western Norway, although BI Norwegian Business School in Bergen and Stavanger have tried to advance to a full university.

==== Specialised universities ====
There are one public and three private specialised universities in Western Norway, each functioning as a national competence centre for the field they represent.

The public specialised universities in Western Norway are:

- Norwegian School of Economics and Business Administration, or Norges handelshøgskole (official site)

The private specialised universities are:

- BI Norwegian Business School, or Handelshøyskolen BI (In Bergen and Stavanger) (official site)
- VID Specialized University in Stavanger and Sandnes or VID vitenskapelige høgskole (official site)

==== University colleges ====
The 7 university colleges in Western Norway are responsible for regional education of primarily bachelor level education within the fields of nursing, teaching, business management, engineering and information technology, though most colleges also offer a number of other educations as well.

The public university colleges in Western Norway consist of:

- Bergen National Academy of the Arts, or Kunsthøgskolen i Bergen (official site)
- Bergen University College, or Høgskolen i Bergen (official site)
- Molde University College, or Høgskolen i Molde (official site)
- Sogn og Fjordane University College, or Høgskolen i Sogn of Fjordane (official site)
- Stord/Haugesund University College, or Høgskolen i Stord/Haugesund (official site)
- Volda University College, or Høgskolen i Volda (official site)
- Ålesund University College, or Høgskolen i Ålesund (official site)

== Culture ==
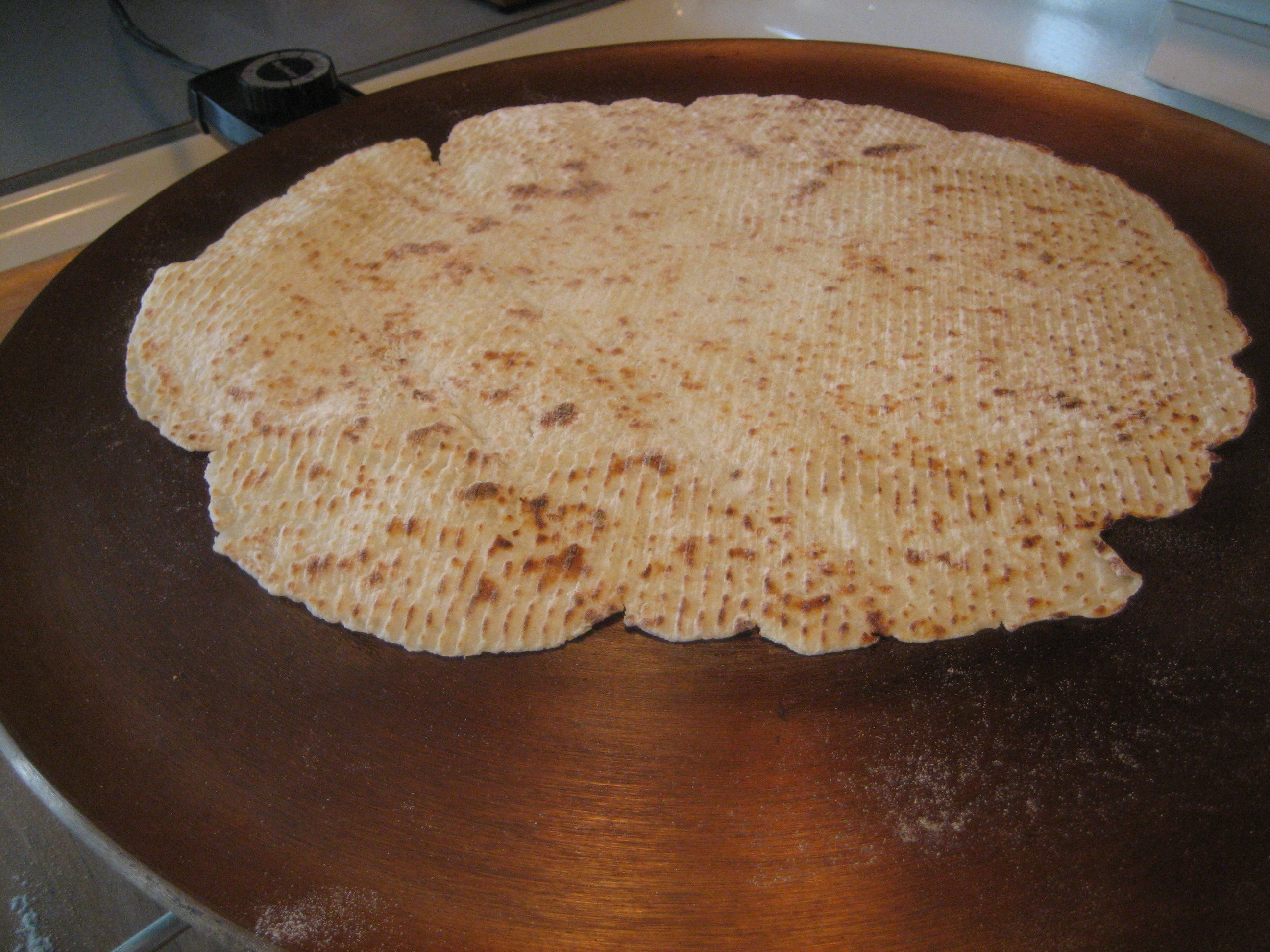
Lefse, a traditional potato flatbread from Western Norway

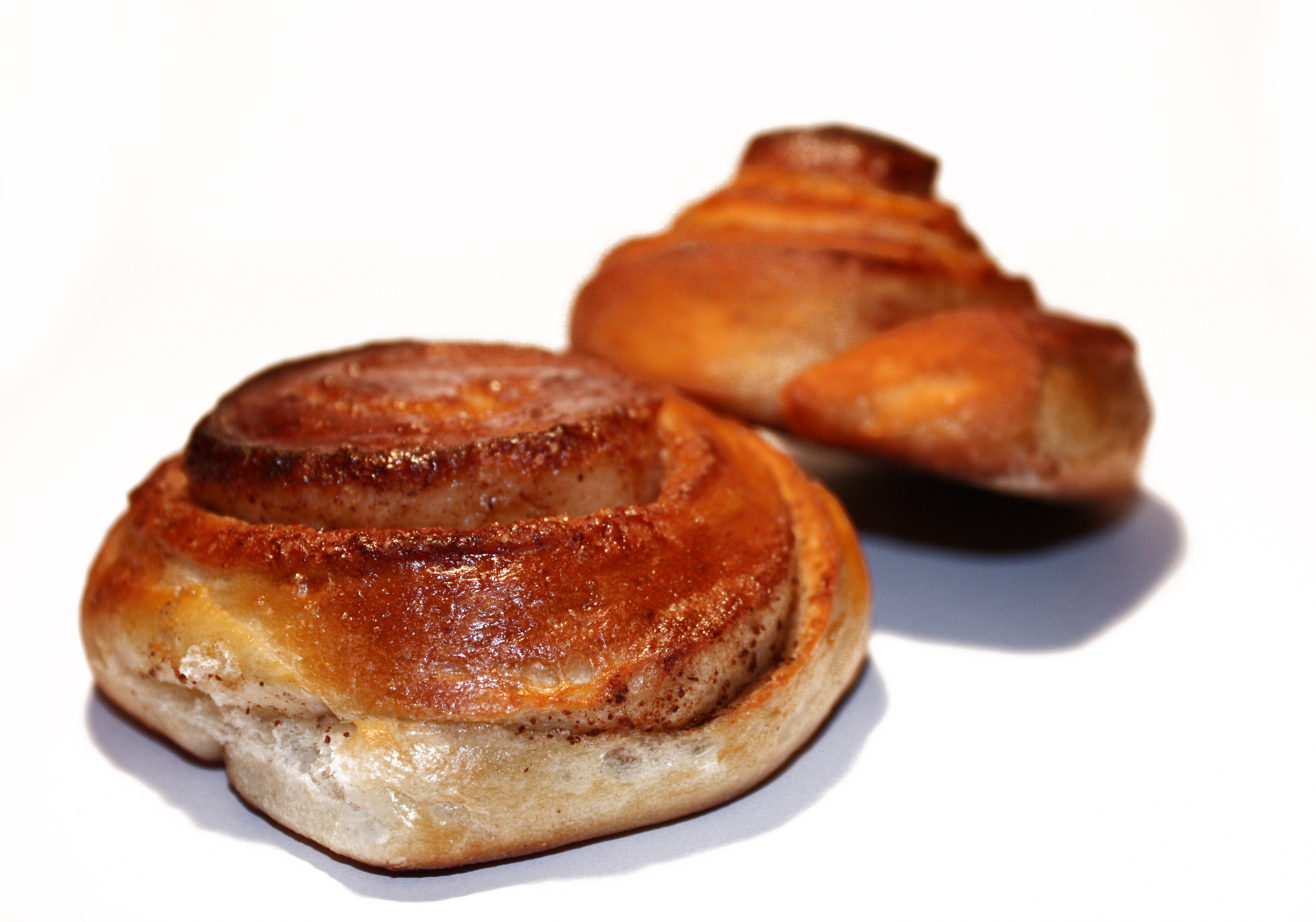
Skillingsboller, a traditional roll from Bergen

=== Cuisine ===
Western Norway is famous for much of the cuisine in Norway. In its traditional form is based largely on the raw materials readily available in Norway and its mountains, wilderness and coast. It differs in many respects from its continental counterparts with a stronger focus on game and fish.

Modern Norwegian cuisine, although still strongly influenced by its traditional background, now bears the marks of globalization: Pastas, pizzas and the like are as common as meatballs and cod as staple foods, and urban restaurants sport the same selection one would expect to find in any western European city.

Lamb's meat and mutton is popular in autumn, mainly used in fårikål (mutton stew with cabbage). Pinnekjøtt, cured and sometimes smoked mutton ribs that is steamed for several hours, is traditionally served as Christmas dinner in the western parts of Norway. Another Western specialty is smalahove, a smoked lamb's head.

=== Music ===
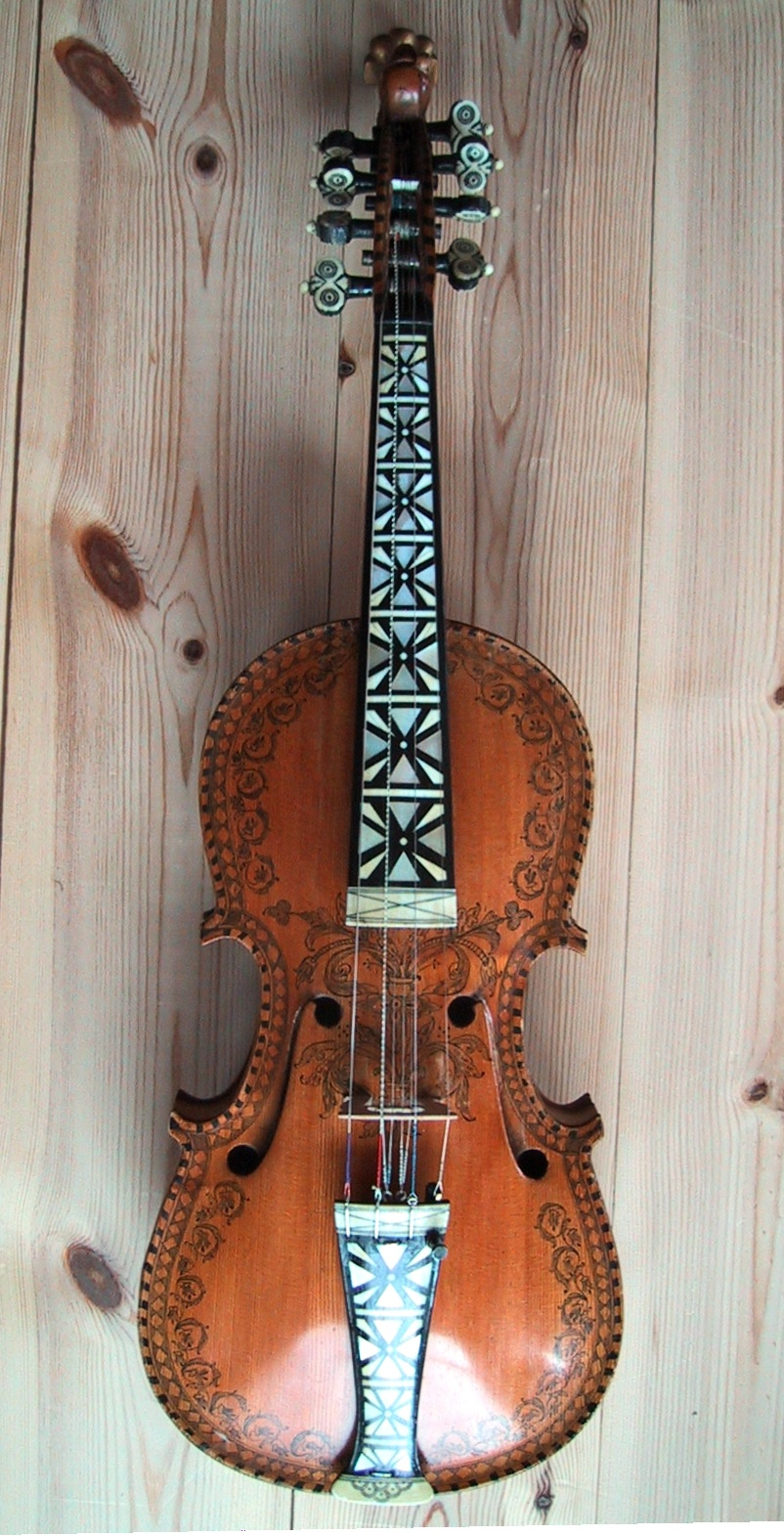
Hardingfele, a fiddle from Hardanger

Music based on traditional Norwegian form usually includes minor or modal scales (sometimes mixed with major scales), making a sober and haunting sound. Pure major key dance music forms also exist. Prior to the 18th century, there is scant written record of what kind of music was played in Norway, but there is a large aural tradition. In 1380, Norway had come under Danish rule, and thus had no royal house or nobility of its own; as a result, for 450 years, Norway did not participate as much in the musical development which occurred in royal (or "cultured") circles throughout the rest of Europe. Religious and traditional (folk) music were dominant throughout this era in rural areas, though again scant records exist to document their nature. In the last half of the 20th century, Norway, like many other countries in the world, underwent a roots revival that saw indigenous music being revived.

The violinist Ole Bull (1810–1880) from Bergen was the first major Norwegian musician. He became world-famous starting in about 1834, and was known as the Nordic Paganini.

From about 1831, traditional Norwegian music began to influence the classical scene, especially through Ole Bull, who befriended the traditional Hardanger fiddle player Myllarguten and through the friendship gained better understanding of traditional music. Bull himself started playing the Hardanger fiddle, and was the first to present folk tunes to the public in urban areas. He also saw to that Myllarguten played with him in concert, presenting a rural traditional musician to an urban audience for the very first time, in February 1849, at the very height of Norwegian romantic nationalism. This later inspired Edvard Grieg to look for folk musical sources. But urban audiences were slow to gain an appreciation and understanding of traditional (rural) music.

Vamp is a band from Haugesund, which was started in 1991. The band's musical profile is a mix of Norwegian folk music, Celtic music and rock.

Leif Ove Andsnes, a pianist from Karmøy Municipality is one of the most famous pianist in the world.

=== Literature ===
Western Norway is famous for many writers. Ludvig Holberg was one of them. He was born in Bergen, but he moved to Copenhagen when he was young. He was influenced by Humanism, the Enlightenment and the Baroque. Other notable writers from Western Norway include Alexander Kielland, Arne Garborg, Bjørnstjerne Bjørnson, Arnulf Øverland, Jon Fosse and Inger Hagerup.

=== Sports ===
Football is a popular sports in Western Norway, like the rest of the country. The first football-team in Norway was probably started by a buekorps in Bergen, Nygaards Bataljonen, in 1883.

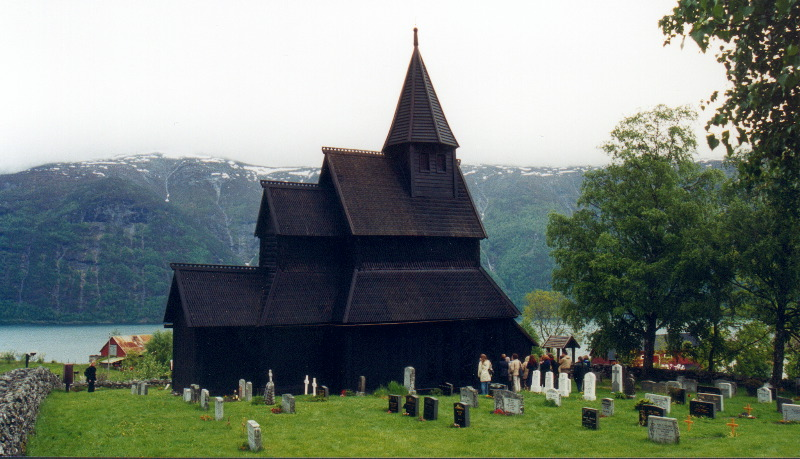
Urnes stave church is now on UNESCO's World Heritage List.

=== Architecture ===
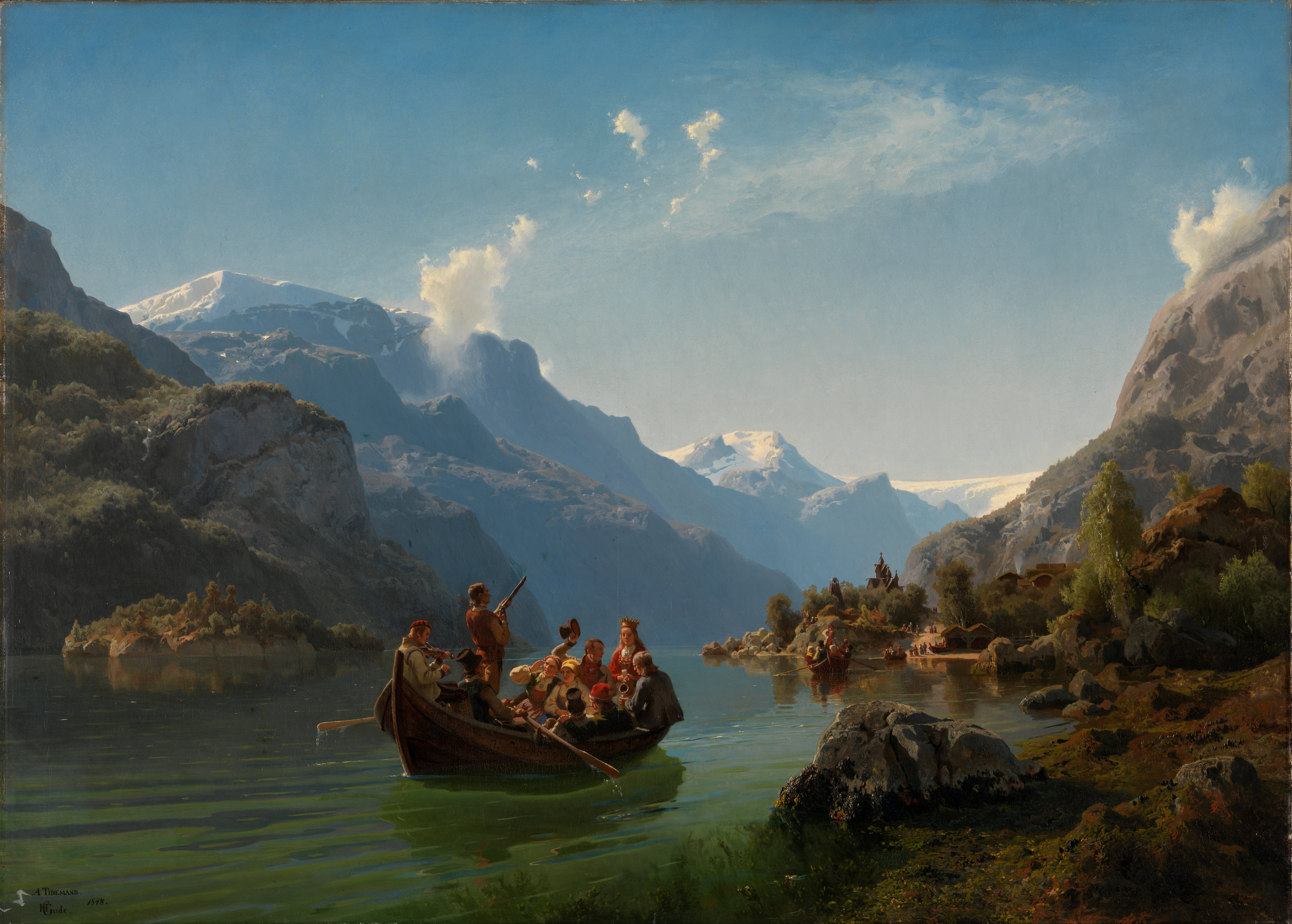
Brudeferden i Hardanger

In the early Middle Ages, stave churches were constructed throughout Norway. Many of them remain to this day and represent Norway's most important contribution to architectural history. A fine example is The Stave Church at Urnes which is now on UNESCO's World Heritage List. Another notable example of wooden architecture is the Bryggen Wharf in Bergen, consisting of a row of narrow wooden structures along the quayside. At the beginning of the 20th century, the city of Ålesund was rebuilt in the Art Nouveau style. The 1930s, when functionalism dominated, became a strong period for Norwegian architecture, but it is only in recent decades that Norwegian architects have truly achieved international renown.

=== Art ===
Kitty Kielland, the sister to A. Kielland and Nikolai Astrup are famous painters from Western Norway. Brudeferden i Hardanger is the best known art from Western Norway. This is painted by the Norwegian painters Adolph Tidemand and Hans Gude.

== Transport ==
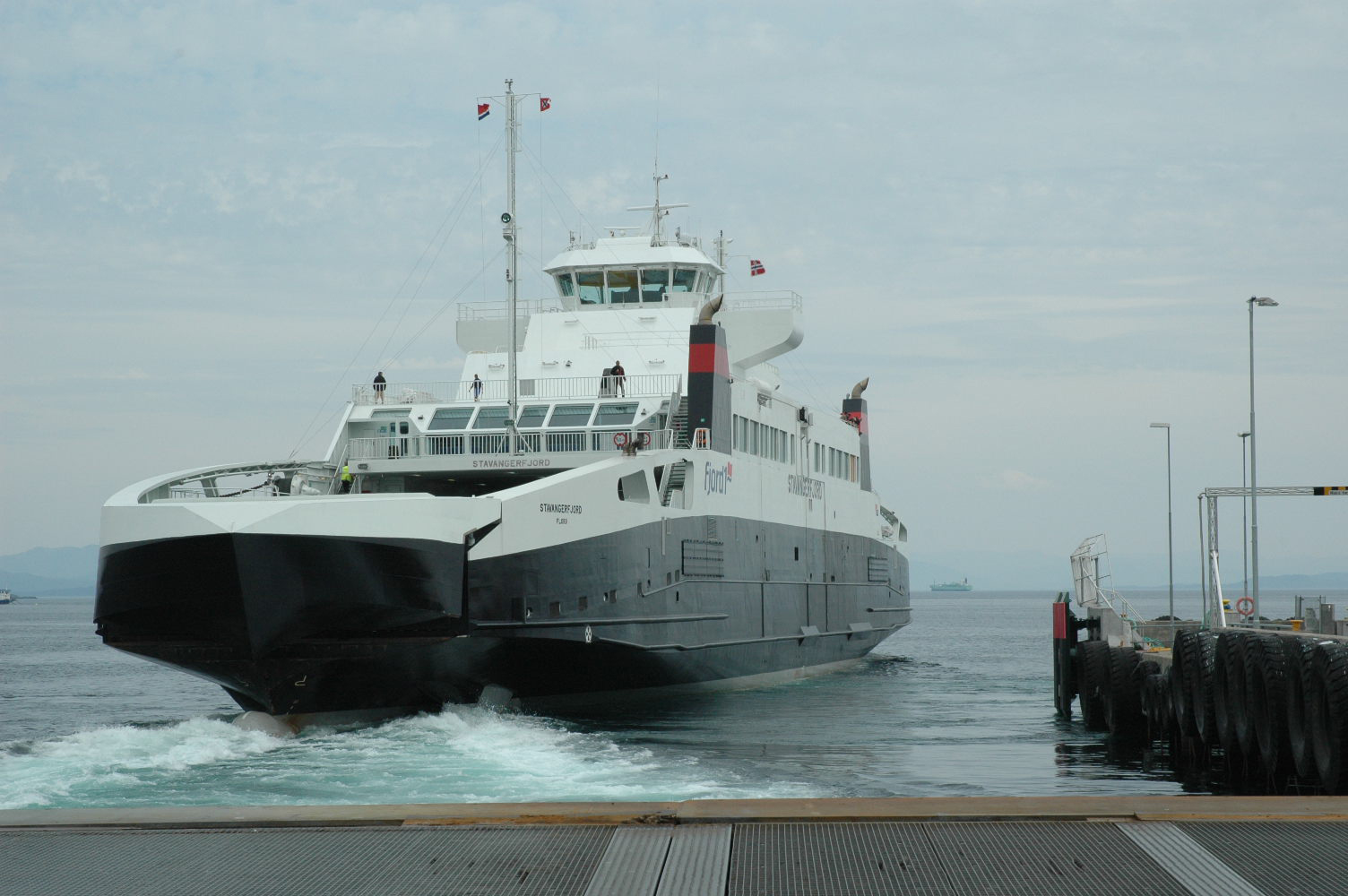
Car ferries are a vital part of the highway infrastructure in coastal regions. Above is "MF Stavangerfjord" which goes between Arsvågen and Mortavika in Rogaland.

=== Aviation ===
Of the 26 airports in Western Norway, 15 are public, and 11 are operated by the state-owned Avinor. Two airports have more than one million passengers annually. 41,089,675 passengers passed through Norwegian airports in 2007, of which 13,397,458 were international.

The regional airport service was introduced in the 1960s, with 30 airports being served by short take-off and landing aircraft. These are located mainly in Sogn og Fjordane, in areas with long distances to large cities and with too little traffic to support commercial flights. The airports, which typically have an 800 metres (2,600 ft) runway, are run by Avinor, while the airplanes are operated based on subsidized public service obligation contracts with the Norwegian Ministry of Transport and Communications. By far the largest contractor is Widerøe with their fleet of de Havilland Canada Dash 8 aircraft, but also Danish Air Transport, Lufttransport and Kato Air have won bids.

=== Rail transport ===
The main long-haul network consists of lines from Bergen Municipality eastwards to Voss Municipality and over the mountains to Oslo and a line connecting Stavanger to Oslo via Kristiansand. There is also a line from Åndalsnes in Romsdal to Oslo. In Bergen there is a funicular and a light rail line. There are also plans for a light rail system further south in the region of Nord-Jæren.

=== Road transport ===
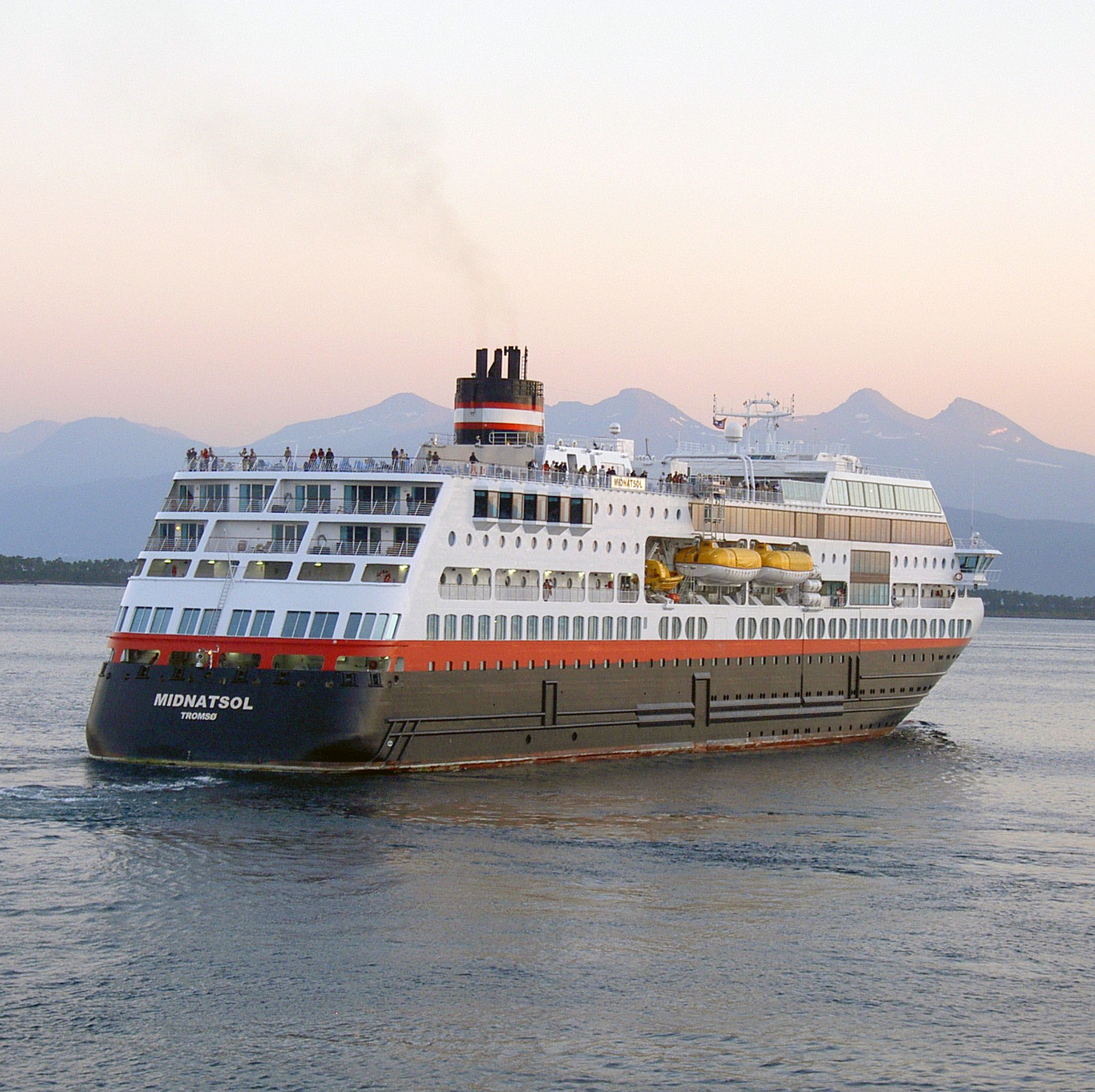
MS Midnatsol of The Coastal Express, Hurtigruten

The most important national routes are part of the European route scheme, and the most prominent are the E39 going north–south through the entire region. National and county roads are managed by the Norwegian Public Roads Administration.

The E39 road passes through the cities, connecting from Trondheim to Aalborg. The E16 road to Oslo passes through the Lærdalstunnelen, the longest road tunnel in the world.

=== Water transport ===
Fast ferries operate many places where fjords and islands make it quicker to follow the waterways than the roads; some small islands are served by water buses. Public transport by ship transported eight million passengers 273 million passenger kilometers in 2007 in whole the country. The Coastal Express (known as Hurtigruten) operates daily cruiseferries from Bergen to Kirkenes, calling at 35 ports. International cruiseferries operate from Bergen and Stavanger to the United Kingdom and Denmark.

The petroleum and natural gas production on the Norwegian continental shelf uses pipelines to transport produce to processing plants on mainland Norway and other European countries; total length is 9,481 kilometres (5,891 mi). The government-owned Gassco operates all natural gas pipelines; in 2006, 88 billion cubic meters were transported, or 15% of European consumption

== Politics ==
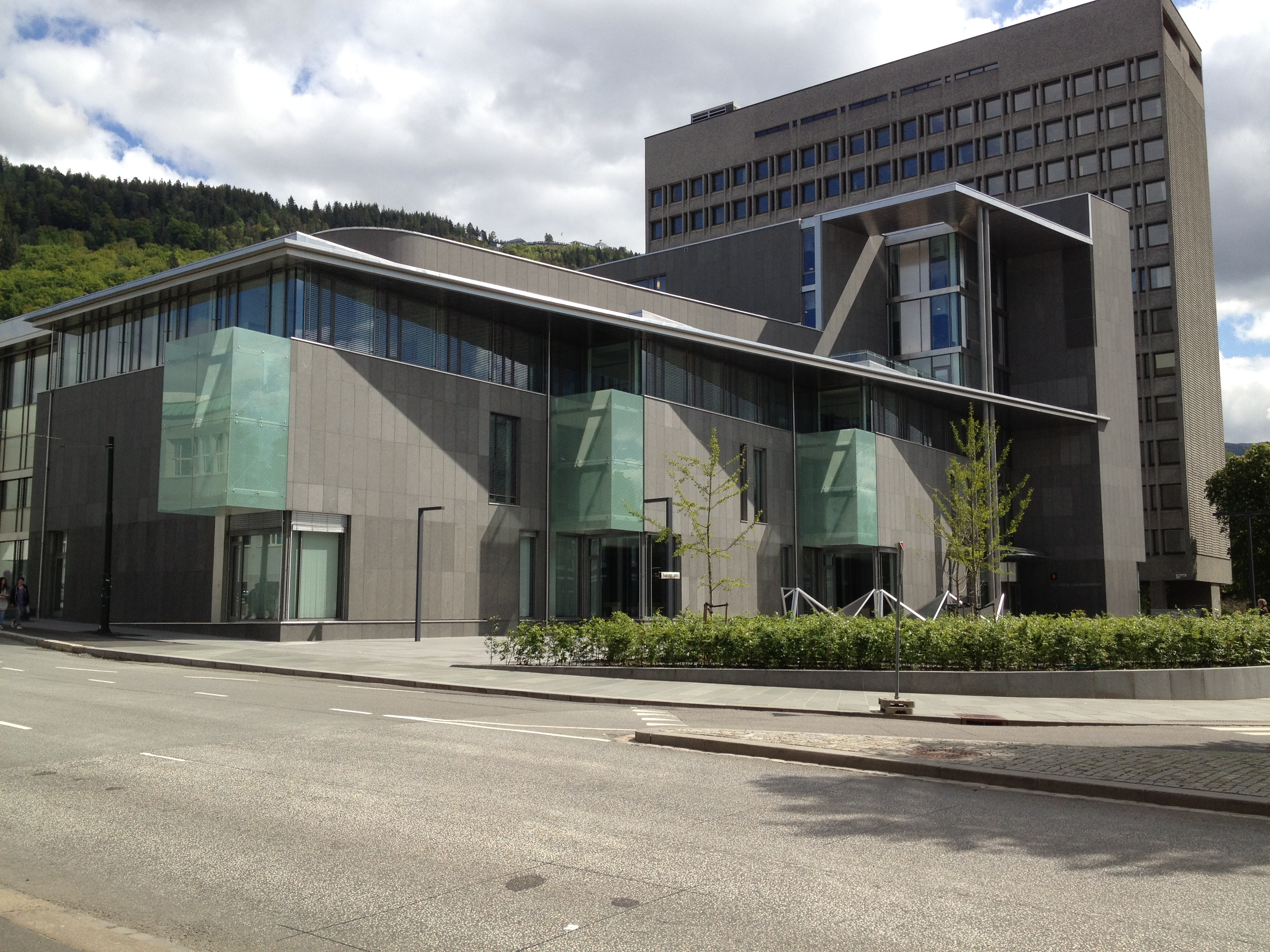
Gulating lagmannsrett cover Rogaland, Hordaland and Sogn og Fjordane, but not Møre og Romsdal.

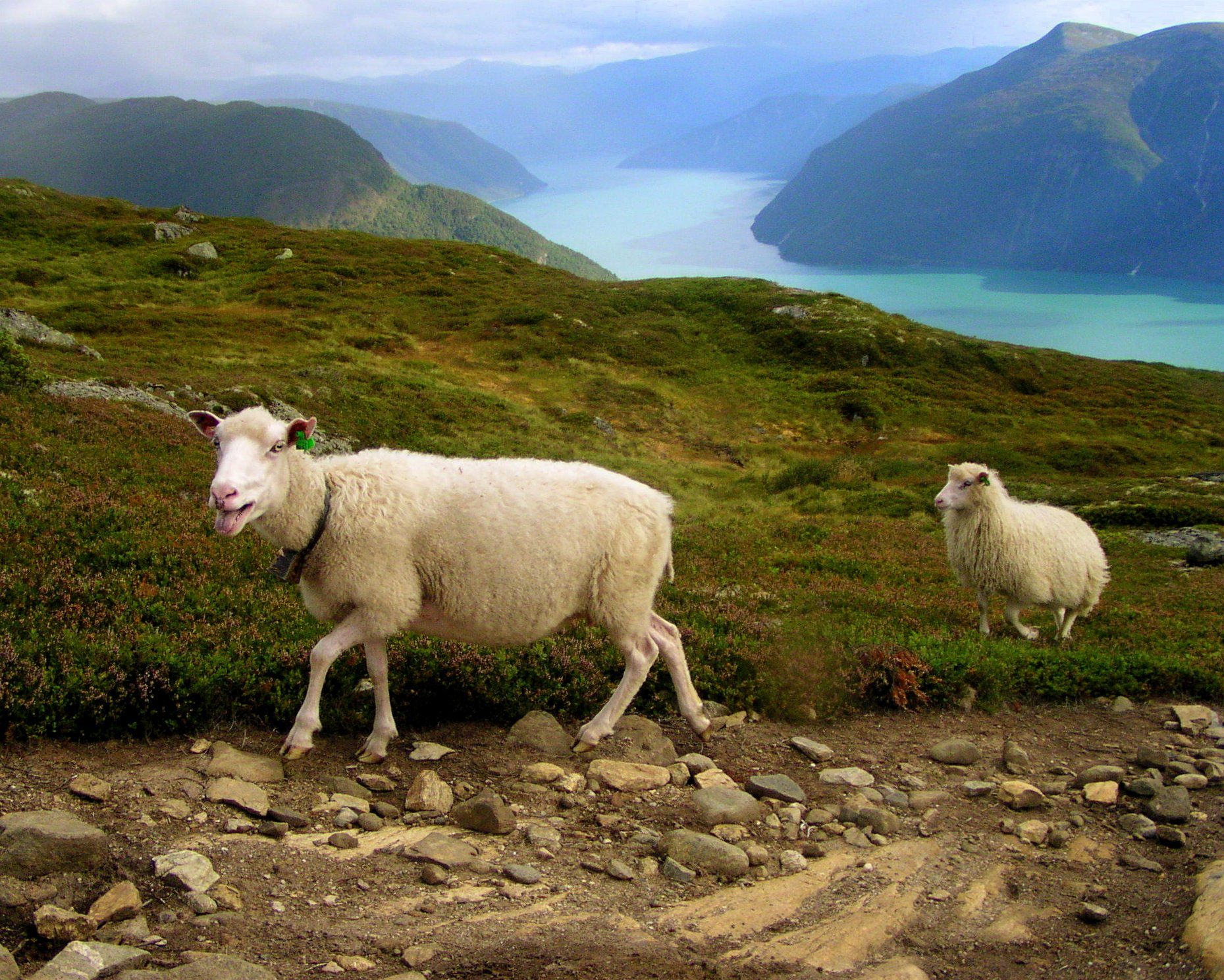
In Sogn og Fjordane policy is little different from in the other counties. A lot of the population votes on the Centre Party. Here is Norwegian sheep and Luster Municipality landscape.

Vestlandet and Sørlandet have always been the two regions of Norway with the greatest preponderance of non-socialist voters. The election in 2007 gave the non-socialist parliamentary parties 65.4% of the vote against the socialist parties' 29.7%. The government party had collected 39.5% against 55.6% parliamentary opposition.

The election in 2007 had the following vote distribution:

- Norwegian Labour Party 24,6%
- Progress Party 20,6%
- Conservative Party of Norway 19,0%
- Christian Democratic Party 10,2%
- Centre Party 9,8%
- Liberal Party of Norway 5,8%
- Socialist Left Party 5,1%
- Red Electoral Alliance 1,6%
- Other 3,4%.

The elections from 2001 to 2009 had the following vote distribution:

Party	2009–2013	2005–2009	2001–2005
Norwegian Labour Party	13	11	8
Progress Party	12	9	7
Conservative Party of Norway	8	6	10
Centre Party	4	4	4
Christian Democratic Party	3	5	8
Socialist Left Party	2	3	5
Liberal Party of Norway	0	4	1

== Cities ==
Western Norway has 22 cities/towns. Three of the cities in Western Norway, Bergen, Stavanger, and Sandnes, are among the ten most populous cities in the country. Cities and towns in the region in descending order by population:

1. Bergen
2. Stavanger
3. Sandnes
4. Ålesund
5. Haugesund
6. Molde
7. Kristiansund
8. Leirvik
9. Egersund
10. Førde
11. Bryne
12. Florø
13. Åkrehamn
14. Kopervik
15. Jørpeland
16. Odda
17. Ulsteinvik
18. Sauda
19. Fosnavåg
20. Skudeneshavn
21. Måløy
22. Åndalsnes

== Districts ==
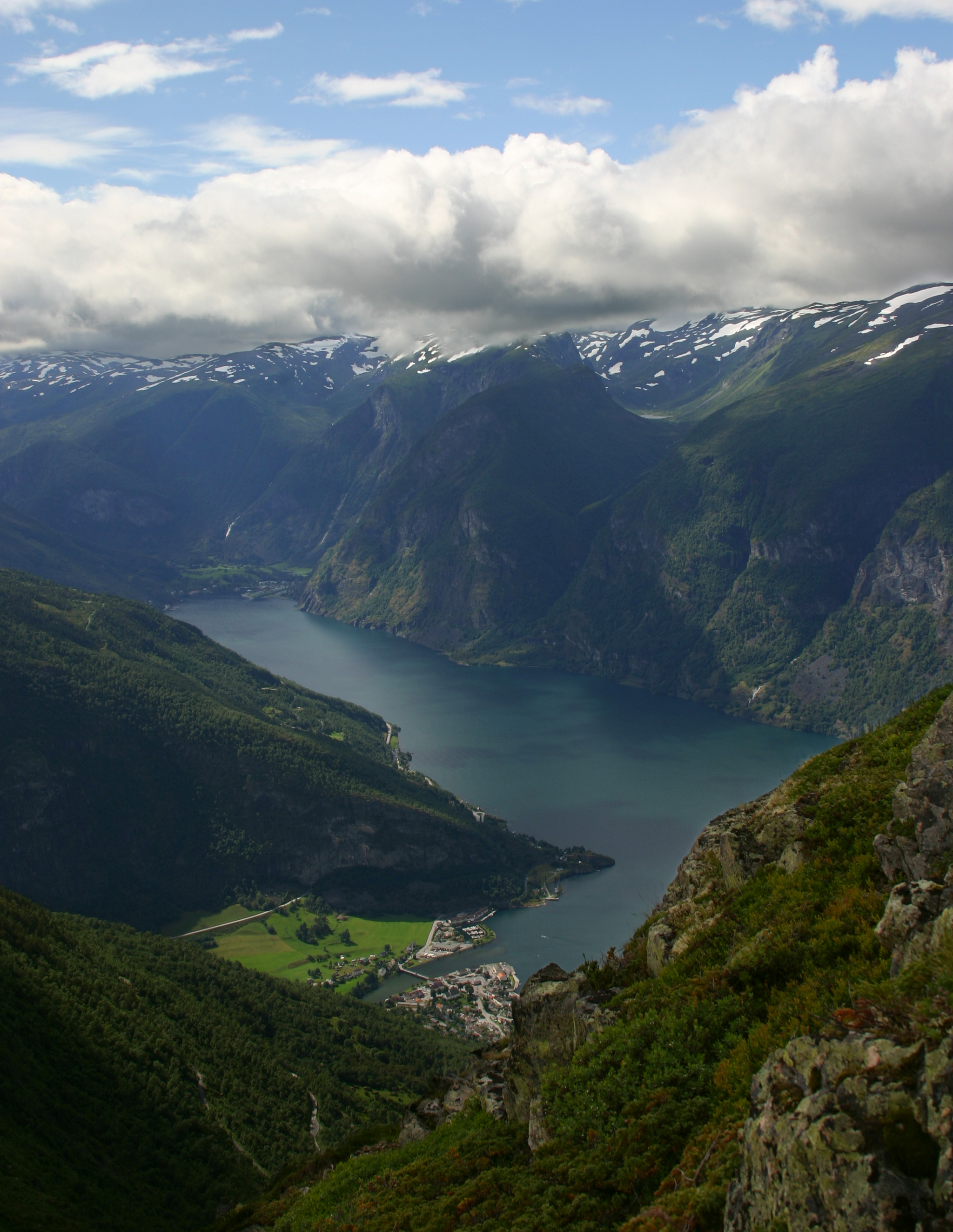
View over Aurlandsvangen and Flåm

These are traditional districts that only partially coincide with present-day administrative divisions. Arranged from North to South.

- Nordmøre (traditionally not considered to be part of Western Norway)
- Romsdal (traditionally the border between Western Norway and Central Norway)
- Sunnmøre
- Nordfjord
- Sunnfjord
- Sogn
- Voss
- Nordhordland
- Midthordland
- Sunnhordland
- Hardanger
- Haugaland
- Ryfylke
- Jæren
- Dalane

== Counties ==
Coat of arms	County	Adm. center	Largest city	Population (2021)	Area (km^{2})	Density	Mayor	Party	Governor	Language form
	Vestland	Bergen	Bergen	638,821	34,062	18,76	Anne Gine Hestetun	Labour Party	Lars Sponheim	Nynorsk
	Rogaland	Stavanger	Stavanger	482,645	9,377	51,47	Solveig Ege Tengesdal	Christian Democratic Party	Magnhild Meltveit Kleppa	Bokmål
	Møre og Romsdal	Molde	Ålesund	265,544	15,121	17,56	Jon Aasen	Labour Party	Lodve Solholm	Nynorsk
Total				1,373,151	58,560 km^{2}	23,45/km^{2}				

== Notable people ==
A

- Ivar Aasen, linguist, writer and creator of Nynorsk
- Niels Henrik Abel, mathematician
- Leo Ajkic, television presenter and actor
- John Anderson, Norwegian-American publisher
- Elisabeth Andreassen, singer and songwriter
- Peter C. Assersen, Rear Admiral in the United States Navy
- Nikolai Astrup, painter
- Aurora, singer and songwriter

B

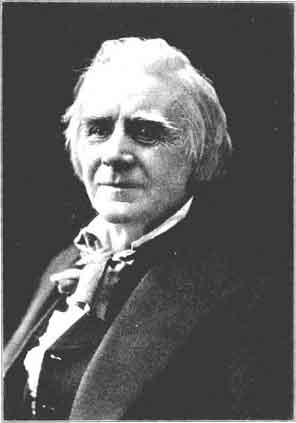
Ole Bull

- Eirik Bakke, football player
- Bjørnstjerne Bjørnson, writer and the 1903 Nobel Prize in Literature laureate
- Cecilia Brækhus, boxer
- Kjell Magne Bondevik, prime minister
- Ole Bull, composer and violinist
- Lars Bystøl, ski jumper

C

- Wilhelm Frimann Koren Christie, attorney and politician

D

- Johan Christian Dahl, painter
- Tone Damli, singer, songwriter

E

- Leif Erikson, regarded as the first European to set foot in North America

F

- Harald Fairhair, king traditionally believed to have united Norway
- Jan Åge Fjørtoft, football player
- Tore André Flo, football player and coach
- Jon Fosse, author, playwright and the 2023 Nobel Prize in Literature laureate
- Kim Friele, gay rights activist
- Herman Friele, mayor and coffee manufacturer
- Einar Førde, politician

G

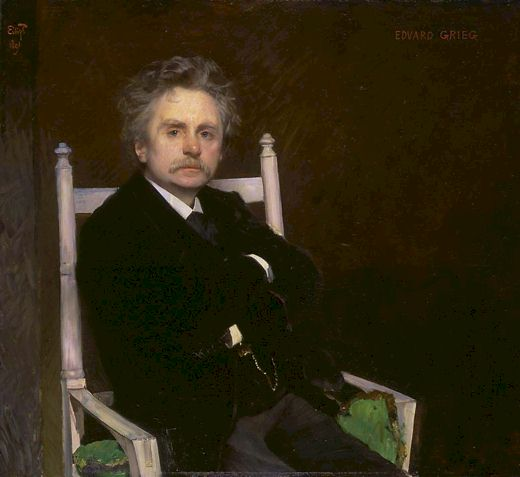
Edvard Grieg

- Arne Garborg, writer
- Ivar Giaever, physicist, nobel laureate
- Edvard Grieg, composer
- Nordahl Grieg, writer and political activist
- Jostein Grindhaug, football player and coach

H

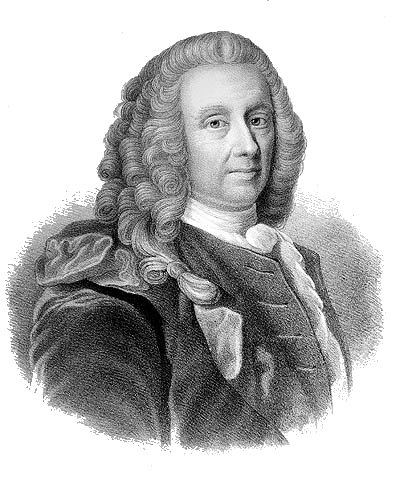
Ludvig Holberg

- Alf-Inge Haaland, football player
- Erling Haaland, football player
- Albert Viljam Hagelin, opera singer and Nazi collaborator
- Inger Hagerup, writer, playwright and poet
- C. J. Hambro, politician
- Brede Hangeland, football player
- Gerhard Henrik Armauer Hansen, physician known for the discovery of the leprosy bacteria, Mycobacterium leprae
- Sig Hansen, Norwegian-American sea captain and TV personality
- Åge Hareide, football player and coach
- Anne Margrethe Hausken, orienteering athlete
- Ada Hegerberg, football player
- Aksel Hennie, actor
- Ludvig Holberg, playwright and author
- Eirik Horneland, football player and coach
- Ingrid Espelid Hovig, television chef and cook book author
- Jens Hundseid, prime minister and Nazi collaborator
- Erik Huseklepp, football player

J

- Roald "Kniksen" Jensen, football player
- Kristoffer Joner, actor
- Helge Jordal, actor

K

- Alexander Kielland, author
- Wollert Konow, prime minister
- Hanne Krogh, singer
- Eirik Kvalfoss, biathlete
- Kygo, DJ and record producer
- Sissel Kyrkjebø, singer

L

- Leif Larsen, naval officer
- Øyvind Leonhardsen, football player
- Sophus Lie, mathematician
- Finn Lied, politician
- Gulbrand Lunde, chemist and Nazi collaborator

M

- Christian Michelsen, first prime minister of an independent Norway
- Maren Mjelde, football player
- Johan Ludwig Mowinckel, prime minister and shipping magnate

N

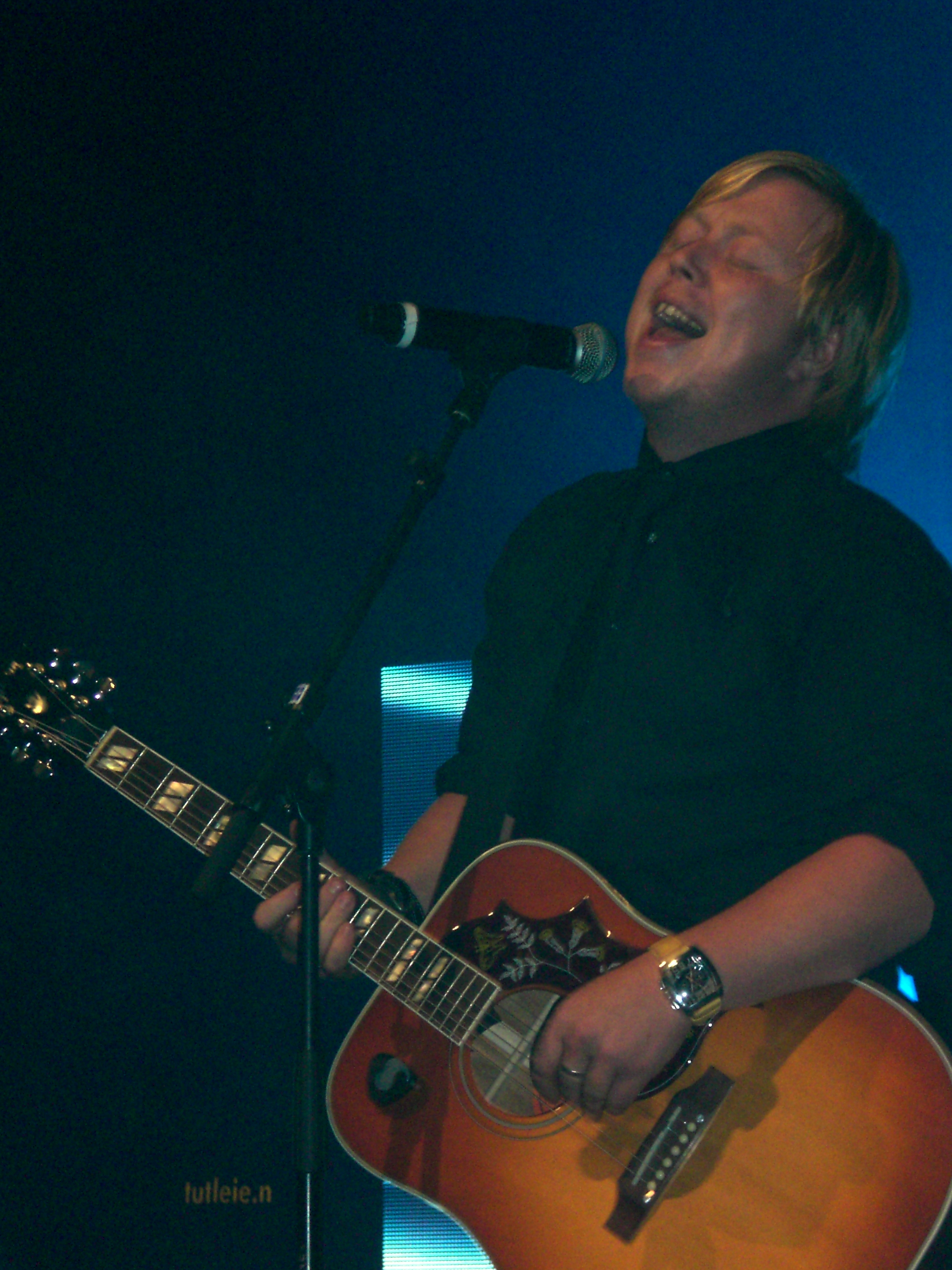
Kurt Nilsen

- Liv Signe Navarsete, politician
- Knute Nelson, politician, senator of Minnesota
- Jo Nesbø, author and musician
- Kurt Nilsen, singer, winner Norwegian Idol season one, and World Idol.

O

- Alexander Dale Oen, swimmer
- Elise Ottesen-Jensen, journalist and activist
- Janove Ottesen, musician
- Kristian Ottosen, writer and resistance fighter

P

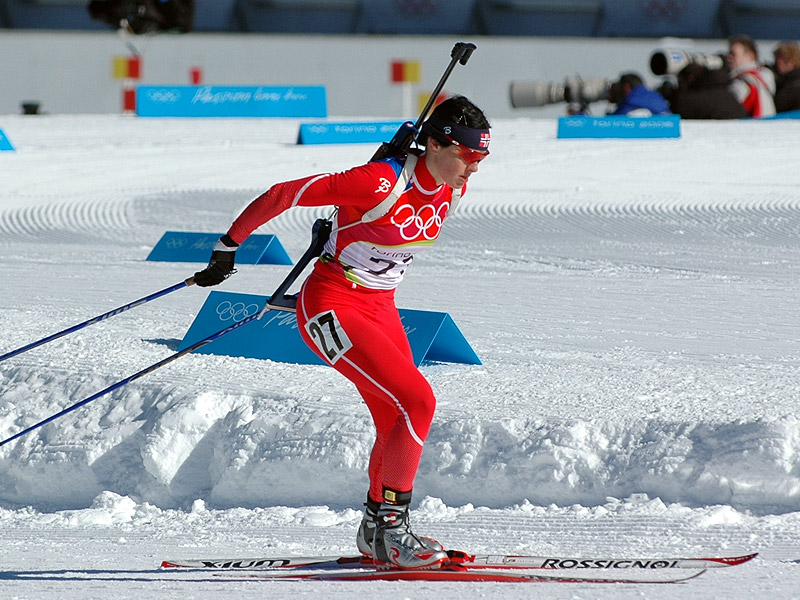
Liv Grete Skjelbreid Poirée

- Liv Grete Skjelbreid Poirée, biathlete

R

- Kjetil Rekdal, football player and coach
- Bjørn Helge Riise, football player and coach
- John Arne Riise, football player and coach
- Knute Rockne, American football player
- Kjell Inge Røkke, businessman
- Joachim Rønneberg, army officer and resistance fighter

S

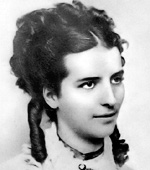
Amalie Skram

- Jakob Sande, writer, poet and folk singer
- Eric Sevareid, journalist
- Geir Skeie, chef, winner of the 2008 Bocuse d'Or Europe, and the 2009 Bocuse d'Or world final
- Amalie Skram, writer
- Erna Solberg, prime minister
- Ole Gunnar Solskjær, football player and coach
- Asbjørn Sunde, resistance fighter, politician and convicted spy
- Susanne Sundfør, singer and songwriter
- Harald Sverdrup, oceanographer
- Kathrine Sørland, fashion model, Miss Norway winner

T

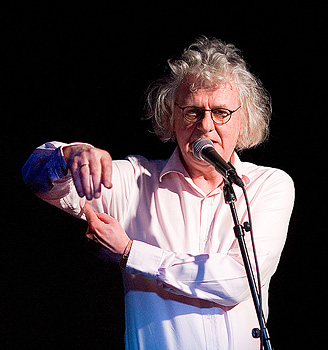
Per Inge Torkelsen

- Erik Thorstvedt, football player
- Pia Tjelta, actress
- Thormodus Torfæus, historian
- Per Inge Torkelsen, comedian
- Kari Traa, skier

U

- Ole Gabriel Ueland, politician

V

- Kristian Valen, comedian and musician
- Varg Vikernes, musician, murderer and arsonist

W

- Alan Walker, DJ and music producer
- Nicolai Wergeland, priest and politician

Ø

- Finn Øglænd, author, poet, translator and literature critic
- Arnulf Øverland, author

== Sources ==
- Helle, Knut Vestlandets historie (Bergen, Norway: Vigmostad & Bjørke, 2006) ISBN 978-82-419-0400-4
