= Sogndal Municipality (Rogaland) =

Former municipality in Rogaland, Norway

Sogndal Seaport Municipality Sogndal ladested
- Former municipality
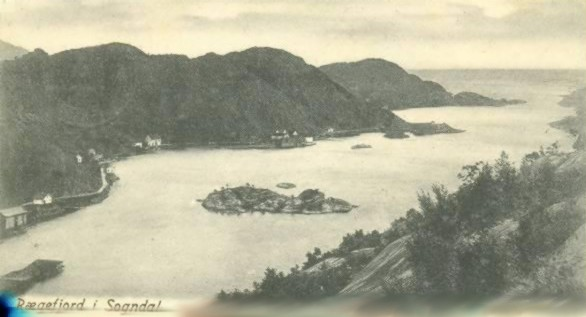
- Postcard from 1910 of Rægefjord in Sogndal

- Rogaland within Norway

- Sogndal within Rogaland
- Coordinates: 58°19′22″N 06°17′04″E
- Country: Norway
- County: Rogaland
- District: Dalane
- Established: 1 Jan 1845
  - Preceded by: Soggendahl Municipality
- Disestablished: 1 July 1944
  - Succeeded by: Sokndal Municipality
- Administrative centre: Sogndalsstranda

Government
  - Mayor (1939–1944): Marcelius Skordal

Area (upon dissolution)
  - Total: 0.19 km^{2} (0.073 sq mi)
- Highest elevation: 158 m (518 ft)

Population (1944)
  - Total: 311
  - Density: 1,600/km^{2} (4,200/sq mi)

Official language
  - Norwegian form: Neutral
- Time zone: UTC+01:00 (CET)
  - Summer (DST): UTC+02:00 (CEST)
- ISO 3166 code: NO-1107

Sogndal is a former municipality and small seaport (ladested) in Rogaland county, Norway. The 19-hectare (47-acre) municipality existed from 1845 until its dissolution in 1944. The area is now part of Sokndal Municipality in the traditional district of Dalane. The administrative centre was the village of Sogndalsstranda. The small municipality was composed of two small neighboring harbor villages: the 7-hectare (17-acre) Sogndalsstranda and the 12-hectare (30-acre) Rægefjord. The river Sogndalselva reaches the ocean at Sogndalsstranda.

== History ==
The seaport village of Sogndalsstranda was built up around the Kjelland farm (historically spelled Kielland). The farm (named after a spring (kilde) situated there) was owned by the Kielland family, from which Alexander Kielland descended. This family left Sogndal in 1751 and established a successful firm in Stavanger. The Kielland farm can still be found there. As is typical of older records, this farm is listed in historical records under a number of phonetically similar names: Kollandt in 1563, Kieldeland in 1567, Kuelandt in 1567, Tielland in 1610, Kielland in 1616, Kiedland in 1668 and finally fixing on Kielland since 1723.

The villages of Sogndalsstranda and Rægestad are located near each other and together they were granted ladested rights in 1798. Together, this ladested was called Sogndal (historically spelled "Soggendahl"). This status gave them a monopoly on import and export of goods and materials in the port and in the surrounding district.

On 1 January 1838, all of Norway was divided up into municipalities according to the formannskapsdistrikt law. The ladested of Sogndal was put into Sokndal Municipality. In 1845, the ladested of Sogndal was separated from Sokndal Municipality to become a separate municipality of its own. Initially, Sogndal ladested had a population of 348 while the rural Sokndal Municipality that surrounded it had a population of 2,819. In 1875, the population of Sogndal ladested had grown to 526, but decreased to 473 in 1885. On 1 July 1944, Sogndal ladested was merged back together with Sokndal Municipality, losing its small seaport status. Prior to the merger, Sogndal ladested had a population of 311.

=== Name ===
The municipality (originally the parish) is named after the Soknedalen valley (Old Norse: Sóknardalr) since the first Sokndal Church was built there. The first element is the genitive case of the river name Sókn (now Sokno). That river name is derived from the verb sœkja which means "to seek" or "to strive for". The last element is dalr which means "valley" or "dale". Thus, the meaning is "the valley with the river which seeks (finds/forces) its way". Before 1918, the name was written "Sogndal" or "Soggendahl". This municipality was a ladested called Sogndal ladested, but it was surrounded by a rural municipality with the same name called Sogndal herred.

== Geography ==
The small seaport municipality was located along the North Sea coast, completely surrounded by Sokndal Municipality. The two parts of the municipality were not contiguous and separated by the rural Sokndal Municipality. The highest point in the municipality was the 158-metre (518 ft) tall mountain Stora Skaråsfjellet, located on the border of Sokndal Municipality.

== Government ==
While it existed, Sogndal Municipality was responsible for primary education (through 10th grade), outpatient health services, senior citizen services, welfare and other social services, zoning, economic development, and municipal roads and utilities. The municipality was governed by a municipal council of directly elected representatives. The mayor was indirectly elected by a vote of the municipal council. The municipality was under the jurisdiction of the Dalane District Court and the Gulating Court of Appeal.

=== Municipal council ===
The municipal council (Bystyre) of Sogndal Municipality was made up of 12 representatives that were elected to four year terms. The tables below show the historical composition of the council by political party.

Sogndal bystyre 1937–1941*
Party name (in Norwegian)	Number of representatives
Local List(s) (Lokale lister)	12
Total number of members:	12
Note: On 1 January 1944, Sogndal Municipality became part of Sokndal Municipality.
Note: Due to the German occupation of Norway during World War II, no elections were held for new municipal councils until after the war ended in 1945.

Sogndal bystyre 1935–1937
Party name (in Norwegian)	Number of representatives
Local List(s) (Lokale lister)	12
Total number of members:	12

Sogndal bystyre 1931–1934
Party name (in Norwegian)	Number of representatives
Local List(s) (Lokale lister)	12
Total number of members:	12

Sogndal bystyre 1928–1931
Party name (in Norwegian)	Number of representatives
Local List(s) (Lokale lister)	12
Total number of members:	12

Sogndal bystyre 1925–1928
Party name (in Norwegian)	Number of representatives
Local List(s) (Lokale lister)	12
Total number of members:	12

Sogndal bystyre 1922–1925
Party name (in Norwegian)	Number of representatives
Local List(s) (Lokale lister)	12
Total number of members:	12

Sogndal bystyre 1919–1922
Party name (in Norwegian)	Number of representatives
Local List(s) (Lokale lister)	12
Total number of members:	12

=== Mayors ===
The mayor (Nynorsk: ordførar) of Sogndal ladested was the political leader of the municipality and the chairperson of the municipal council. The following people have held this position:

- 1858–1858: Tønnes W. Fredrichsen
- 1859–1861: D. Mydland
- 1862–1863: Christian Herlofsen
- 1864–1865: Eilert Dahl Rægeland
- 1866–1866: Christian Herlofsen
- 1867–1870: G. Bie
- 1871–1871: Johan F. Fredrichsen
- 1872–1872: Richard L.S. Jansen
- 1873–1873: Tobias Larsen Mydland
- 1874–1875: Richard L.S. Jansen
- 1876–1876: Johan F. Fredrichsen
- 1877–1879: Christian Herlofsen
- 1880–1880: Tobias Larsen Mydland
- 1881–1883: Christian Herlofsen
- 1884–1887: Fredrik Berntsen
- 1888–1888: Tobias Larsen Mydland
- 1889–1889: Fl. Fredrichsen
- 1890–1893: Jens Rostad
- 1894–1894: C.G. Eia
- 1895–1895: Tobias Larson Mydland
- 1896–1906: Oscar Smith
- 1907–1907: Tollak Årstad
- 1908–1910: Oscar Smith
- 1911–1913: O.M. Horneland
- 1914–1915: B. Mysse
- 1916–1916: Elias Frøiland
- 1917–1939: O.M. Horneland
- 1939–1944: Marcelius Skordal

== See also ==
- List of former municipalities of Norway
