= Sogndalsstranda =

Village in Sokndal Municipality, Norway

Sogndalsstranda Sogndalsstrand Strondo
- Village
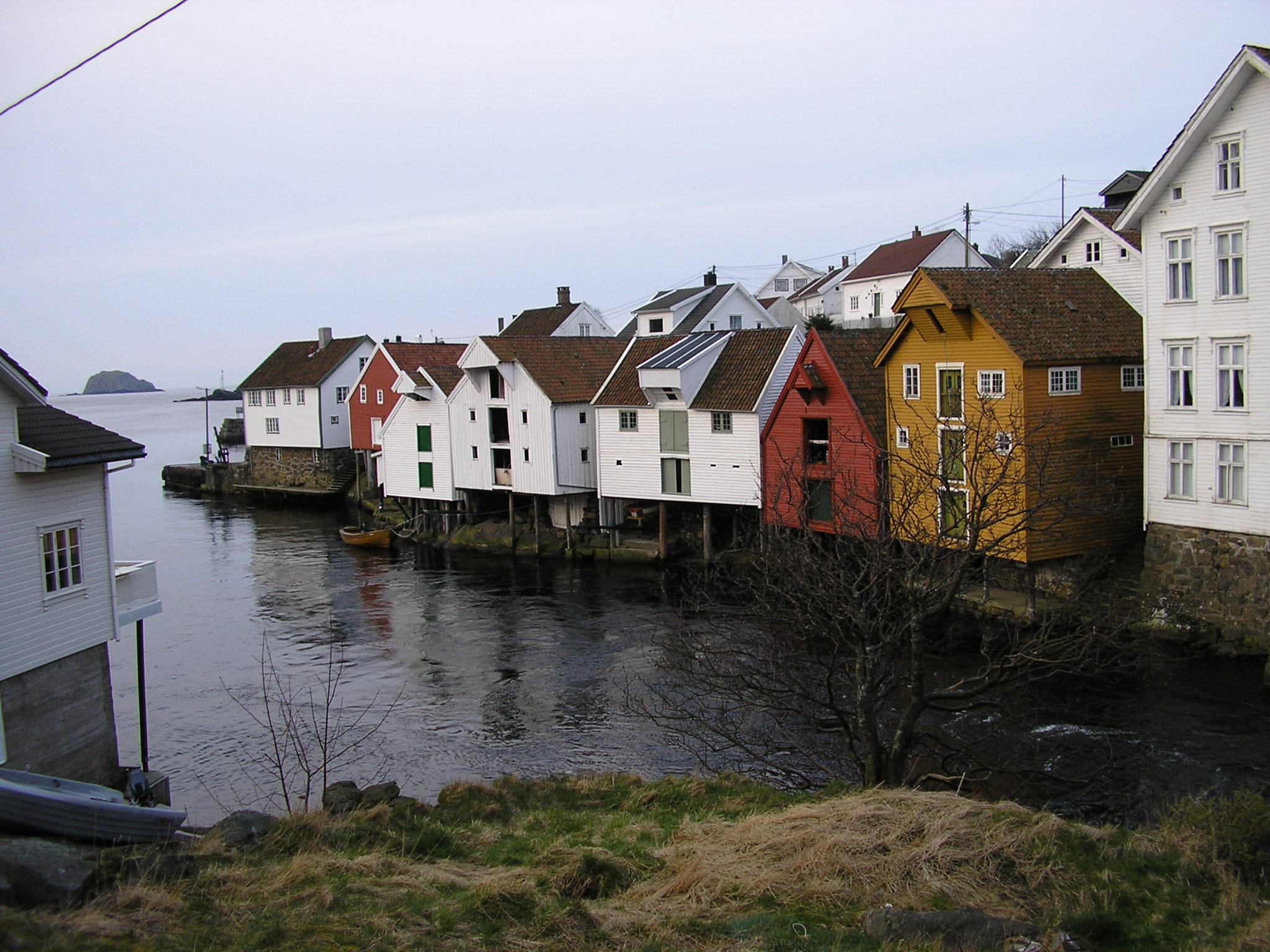
- View of the village
- Interactive map of Sogndalsstranda
- Coordinates: 58.32297°N 6.28466°E
- Country: Norway
- Region: Western Norway
- County: Rogaland
- District: Dalane
- Municipality: Sokndal Municipality
- Elevation: 8 m (26 ft)
- Time zone: UTC+01:00 (CET)
  - Summer (DST): UTC+02:00 (CEST)
- Post Code: 4380 Hauge i Dalane

Sogndalsstranda is a harbor village in Sokndal Municipality in Rogaland county, Norway. The village is located at the mouth of the river Sokno, about 2 kilometres (1.2 mi) south of the municipal centre of Hauge and also about 2 kilometres (1.2 mi) southeast of the village of Rekefjord. The Jøssingfjorden lies about 2.7 kilometres (1.7 mi) southeast of the village.

The village has about 280 residents and it has become a tourist destination since the 1990s. The old village has many wooden buildings and warehouses. These buildings and the surrounding area were protected by law in 2005. Locally, the area is also known as simply Strondo.

== History ==
The village grew up starting in the 1600s and by the 1660s, there was a beach resort located in Sogndalsstranda (historically spelled Sogndalstrand). The villages of Sogndalsstranda and Rekefjord are located near each other and together, they were granted ladested rights in 1798. Together this two-point ladested was called Sogndal (historically spelled "Soggendahl"). This status gave them a monopoly on import and export of goods and materials in the port and in the surrounding district. On 1 January 1838, all of Norway was divided up into municipalities according to the formannskapsdistrikt law.

The ladested of Sogndal was initially part of Sogndal Municipality (Norwegian: Sogndal herred; later spelled Sokndal). In 1845, the ladested was separated from Sogndal Municipality and became the new Sogndal ladested. Initially, Sogndal ladested had a population of 348 while Sogndal Municipality had a population of 2,819. On 1 July 1944, Sogndal ladestad was reunited with Sokndal Municipality, losing its small seaport status. Prior to the merger Sogndal had a population of 311.
