= Eiavatnet =

Lake in Rogaland, Norway

- Interactive map of Eiavatnet
- Location: Dalane, Rogaland
- Coordinates: 58.44361°N 6.24638°E
- Basin countries: Norway
- Max. length: 5.5 kilometres (3.4 mi)
- Max. width: 2 kilometres (1.2 mi)
- Surface area: 4.29 km^{2} (1.66 sq mi)
- Shore length^{1}: 35.91 kilometres (22.31 mi)
- Surface elevation: 139 metres (456 ft)
- References: NVE
- ^{1} Shore length is not a well-defined measure.

Eiavatnet is a lake in Rogaland county, Norway. The 4.29-square-kilometre (1.66 sq mi) lake is located on the border of Eigersund Municipality and Sokndal Municipality, about 15 kilometres (9.3 mi) east of the town of Egersund. The lake is regulated at an elevation of 139 metres (456 ft) so it can be used as a reservoir for the Lindland Power Station which is located a short distance north of Hauge in Sokndal Municipality. The lake Grøsfjellvatnet lies about 1 kilometre (0.62 mi) north of this lake.

== See also ==
- List of lakes in Norway
