= Rekefjord (fjord) =

Fjord in Rogaland, Norway

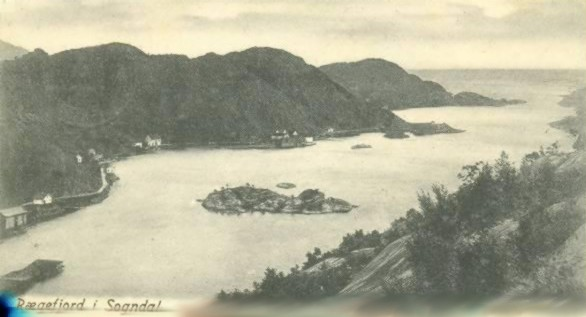
- View of the fjord
- Interactive map of the fjord
- Location: Rogaland county, Norway
- Coordinates: 58.33039°N 6.25968°E
- Type: Fjord
- Primary outflows: North Sea
- Basin countries: Norway
- Max. length: 3 kilometres (1.9 mi)
- Settlements: Rekefjord

Rekefjord is a fjord in Sokndal Municipality in Rogaland county, Norway. The central part of the 3-kilometre (1.9 mi) long fjord is the site of the village of Rekefjord. The village of Hauge lies about 1 kilometre (0.62 mi) east of the fjord.

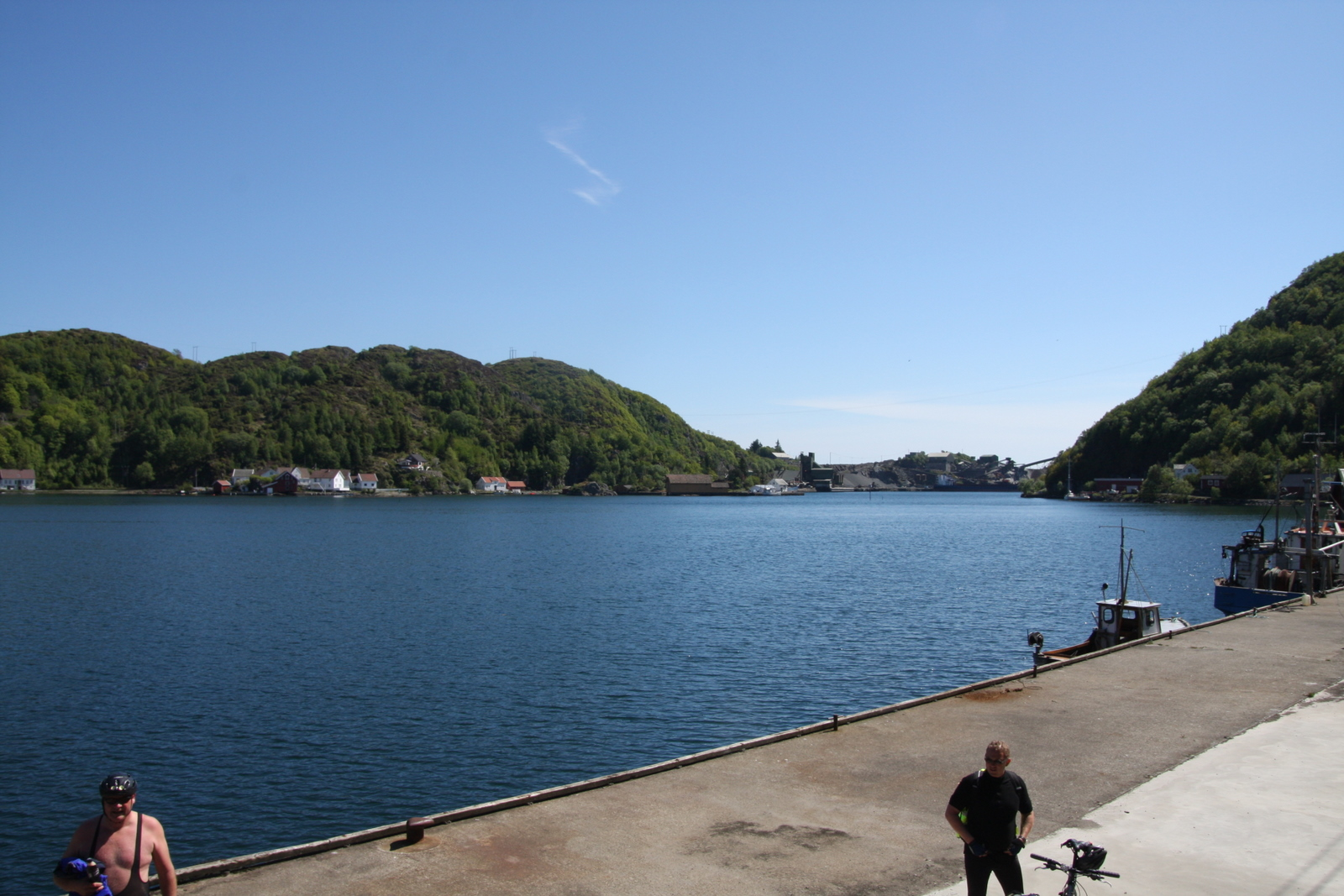

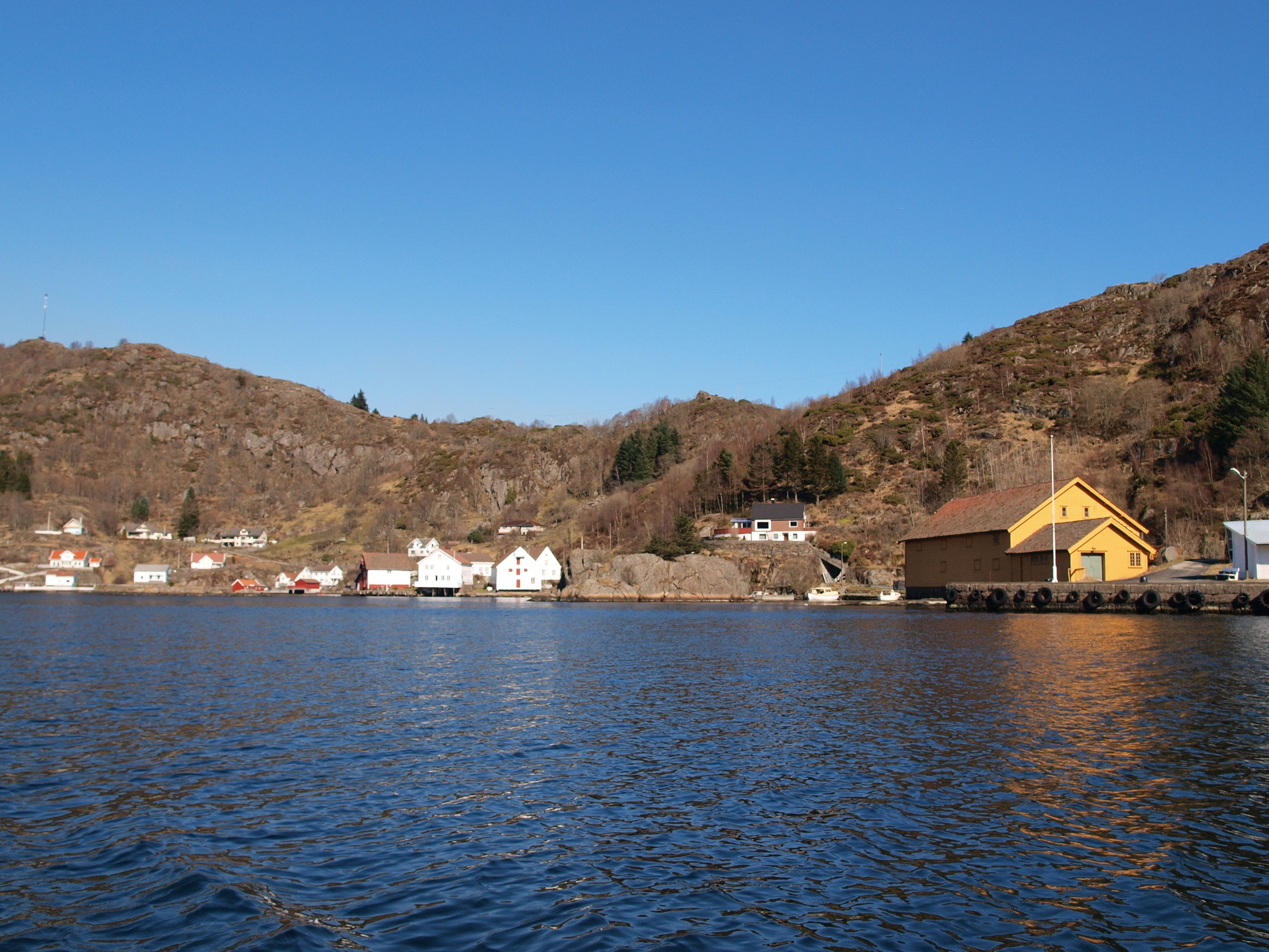

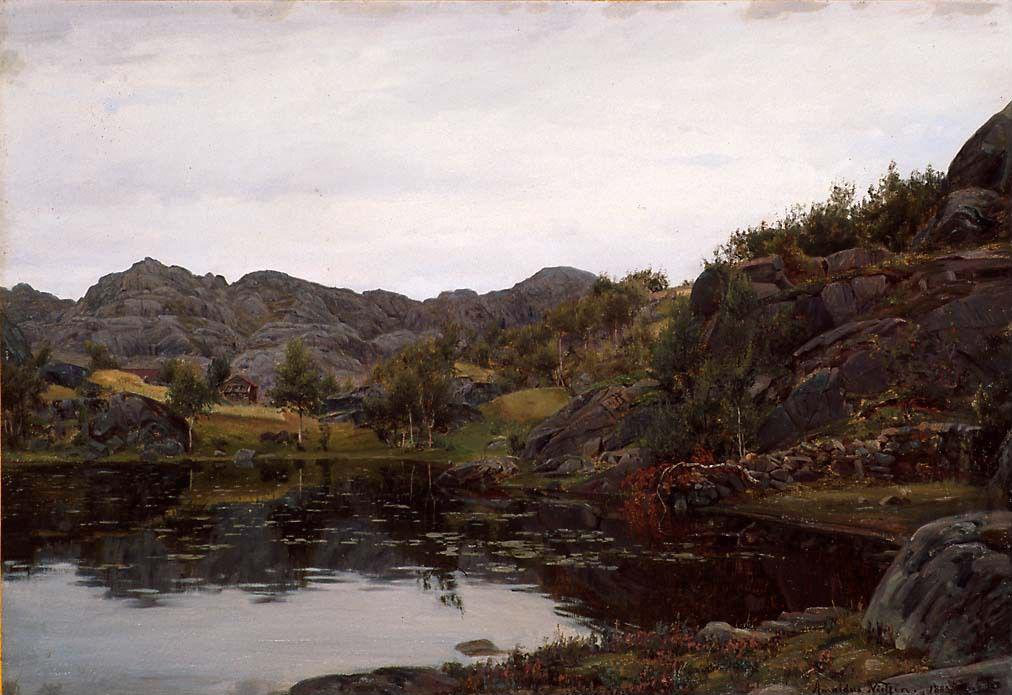

== See also ==
- List of Norwegian fjords
