= Sokndal Municipality =

Municipality in Rogaland, Norway

Sokndal Municipality Sokndal kommune
- Municipality
- Sogndal herred (historic name); Soggendal herred (historic name)
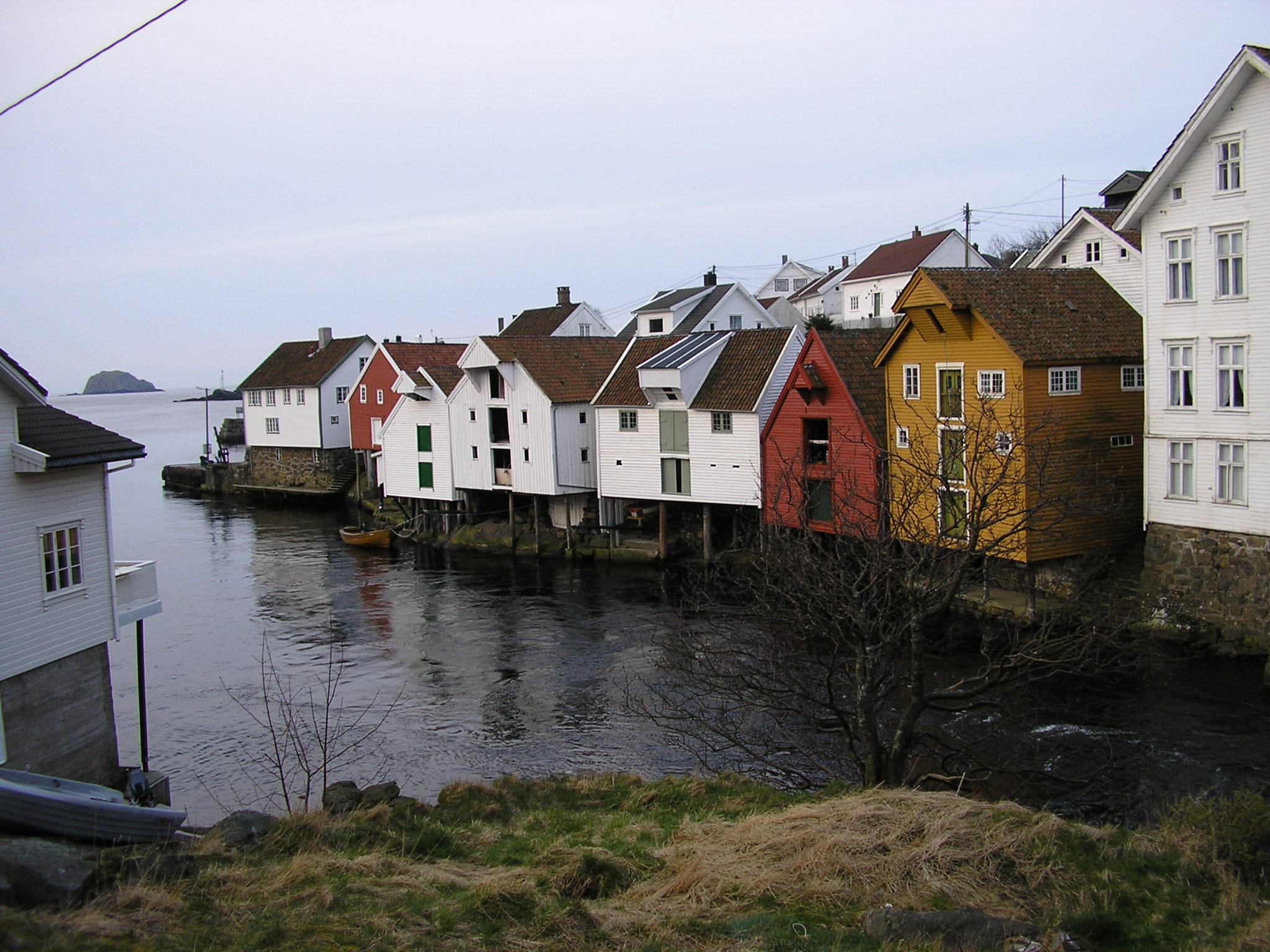
- View of Sogndalsstranda

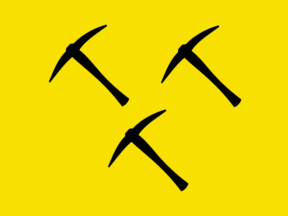
- Flag Coat of arms

- Rogaland within Norway

- Sokndal within Rogaland
- Coordinates: 58°21′54″N 06°18′37″E
- Country: Norway
- County: Rogaland
- District: Dalane
- Established: 1 Jan 1838
  - Created as: Formannskapsdistrikt
- Administrative centre: Hauge i Dalene

Government
  - Mayor (2023): Bjørn-Inge Mydland (Sp)

Area
  - Total: 294.97 km^{2} (113.89 sq mi)
  - Land: 266.93 km^{2} (103.06 sq mi)
  - Water: 28.04 km^{2} (10.83 sq mi) 9.5%
  - Rank: #267 in Norway
- Highest elevation: 619.9 m (2,034 ft)

Population (2026)
  - Total: 3,356
  - Rank: #220 in Norway
  - Density: 11.4/km^{2} (30/sq mi)
  - Change (10 years): ▲ +1.3%
- Demonym: Sokndøl

Official language
  - Norwegian form: Neutral
- Time zone: UTC+01:00 (CET)
  - Summer (DST): UTC+02:00 (CEST)
- ISO 3166 code: NO-1111
- Website: Official website

Sokndal is the southernmost municipality in Rogaland county, Norway. It is located in the traditional district of Dalane. The administrative centre of the municipality is the village of Hauge. Other villages in Sokndal include Jøssingfjord, Rekefjord, Sogndalsstranda, and Åna-Sira.

Sogndalsstranda is a picturesque, old fishing village, which may have inspired the municipality in becoming Norway's first member of Cittaslow. The Jøssingfjorden, known for the Altmark Incident, is also located in Sokndal Municipality.

The 294.97-square-kilometre (113.89 sq mi) municipality is the 267th largest by area out of the 357 municipalities in Norway. Sokndal Municipality is the 220th most populous municipality in Norway with a population of 3,356. The municipality's population density is 11.4 inhabitants per square kilometre (30/sq mi) and its population has increased by 1.3% over the previous 10-year period.

== General information ==
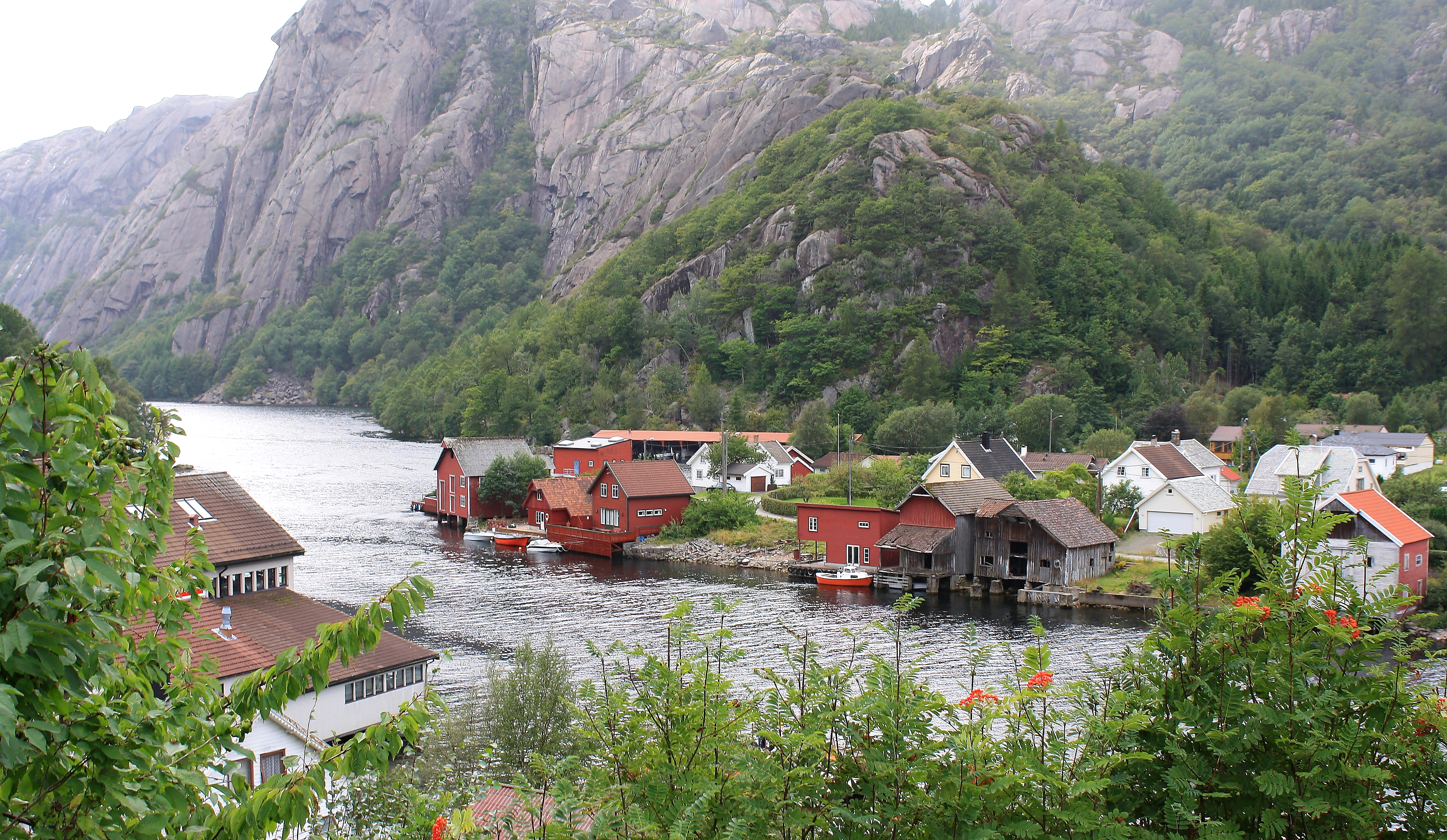
Village of Åna-Sira

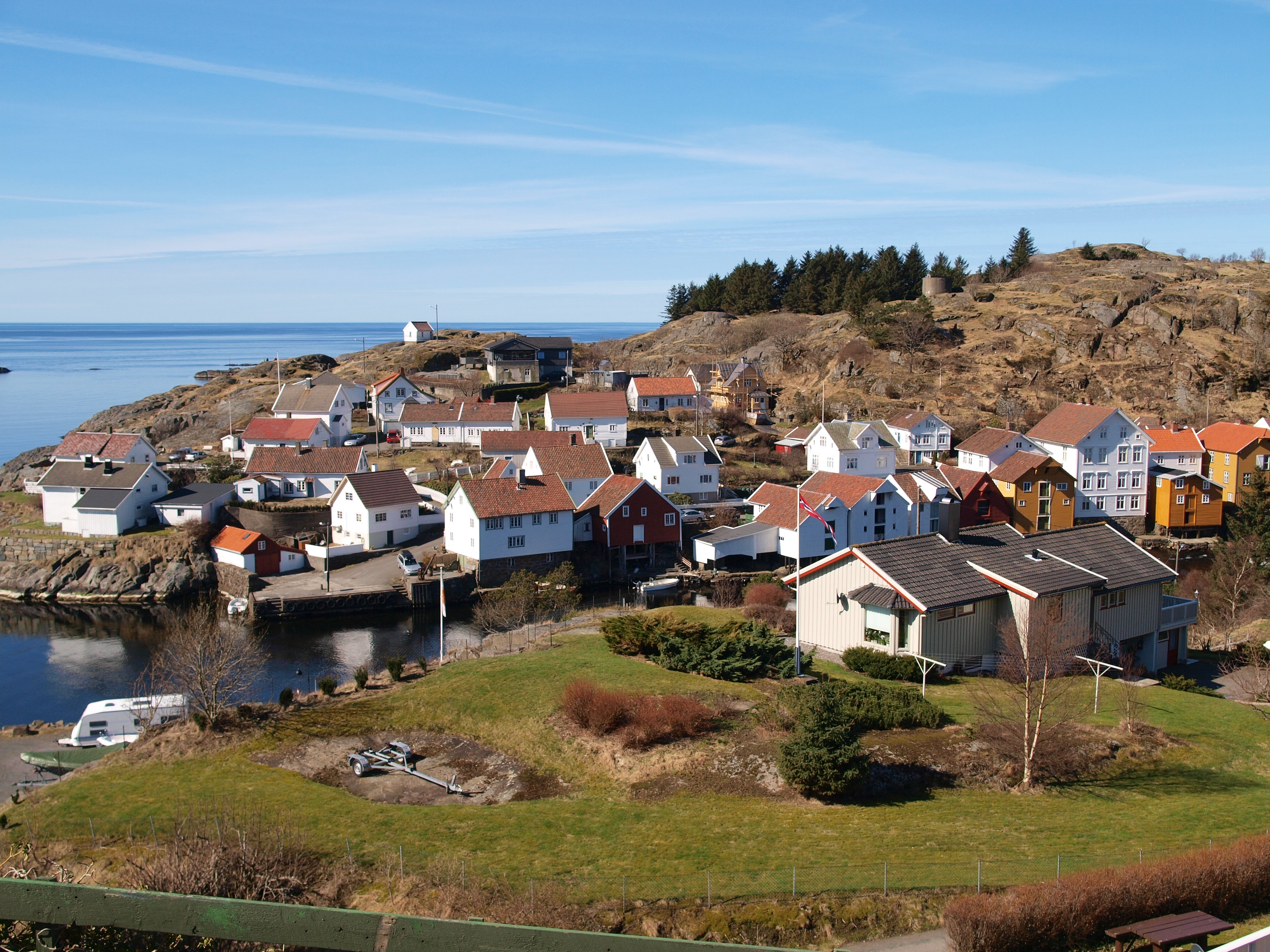
Village of Sogndalsstranda

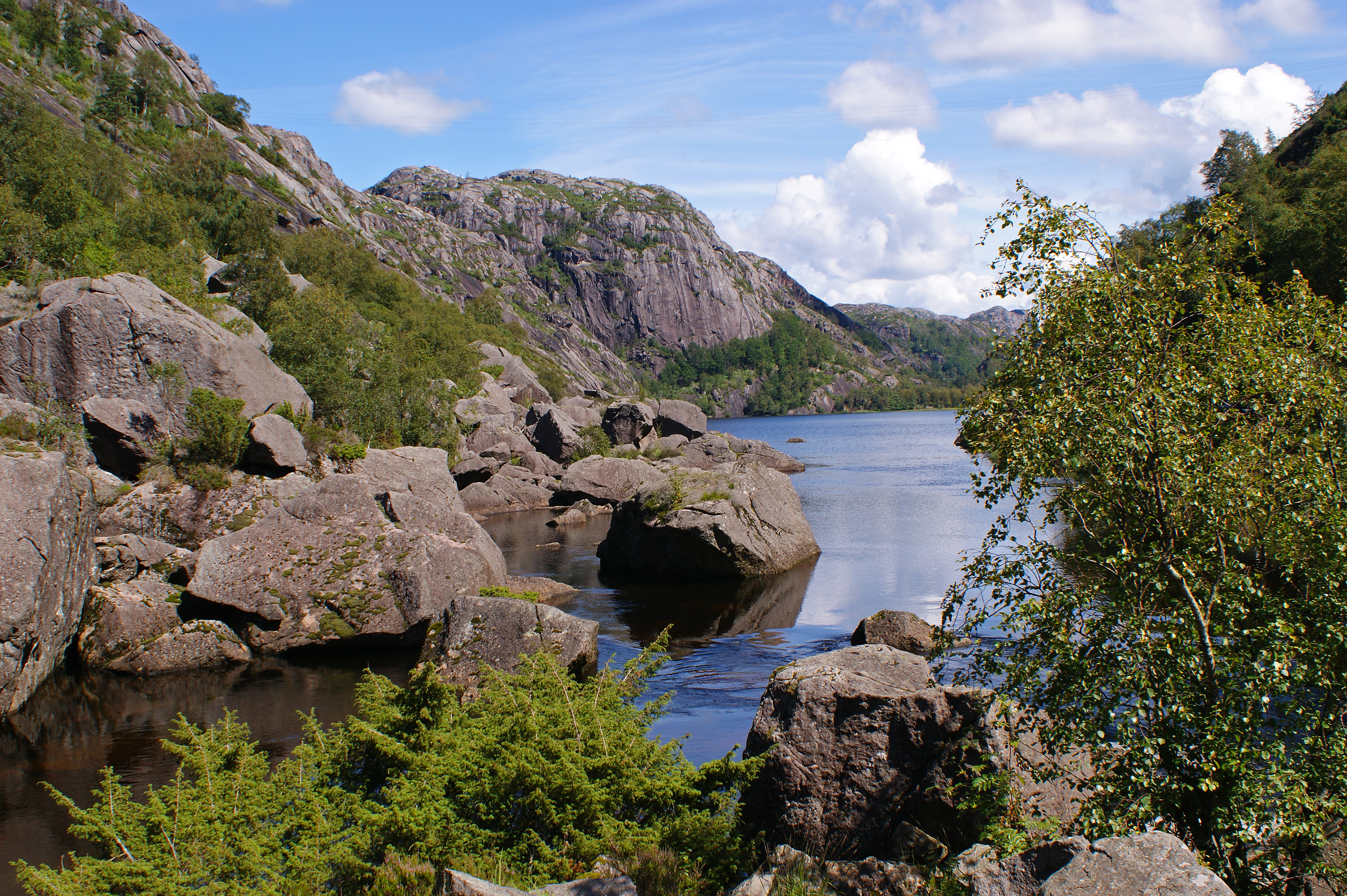
Landscape in Sokndal

The parish of Soggendal (later spelled Sokndal) was established as a municipality on 1 January 1838 (see formannskapsdistrikt law). In 1845, the small ladested of Sogndal (population: 348) was separated from Sokndal Municipality to become a municipality of its own. This left Sokndal Municipality with 2,819 residents. On 12 December 1868, a small part of Sokndal Municipality (population: 41) was transferred to neighboring Eigersund Municipality. On 1 July 1944, the municipality of Sogndal ladested (population: 311) was reincorporated into Sokndal Municipality. In 1947, a small area in Sokndal Municipality (population: 7) was transferred to Eigersund Municipality. On 1 January 1967, the Tjørn farm (population: 10) was transferred from Eigersund Municipality to Sokndal Municipality.

=== Name ===
The municipality (originally the parish) is named after the Soknedalen valley (Old Norse: Sóknardalr) since the first Sokndal Church was built there. The first element is the genitive case of the river name Sókn (now Sokno). That river name is derived from the verb sœkja which means "to seek" or "to strive for". The last element is dalr which means "valley" or "dale". Thus, the meaning is "the valley with the river which seeks (finds/forces) its way".

Historically, the name of the municipality was spelled Soggendal or Sogndal. On 3 November 1917, a royal resolution changed the spelling of the name of the municipality to Sokndal.

=== Coat of arms ===
The coat of arms was granted on 8 July 1988. The official blazon is "Or, three pickaxes bendwise sable" (Norwegian: I gull tre svarte hakker, 2-1). This means the arms have a field (background) has a tincture of Or which means it is commonly colored yellow, but if it is made out of metal, then gold is used. The charge is a set of three pickaxes with two over one. This design was chosen to symbolize the importance of mining and agriculture in the municipality. The arms were designed by John Digernes from Haugesund. The municipal flag has the same design as the coat of arms.

=== Churches ===
The Church of Norway has one parish (sokn) within Sokndal Municipality. It is part of the Dalane prosti (deanery) in the Diocese of Stavanger.

Churches in Sokndal Municipality
Parish (sokn)	Church name	Location of the church	Year built
Sokndal	Sokndal Church	Hauge	1803
Sokndal	Åna-Sira Church	Åna-Sira	1888

== Geography ==
The municipality is the southernmost in Rogaland county. The North Sea lies to the south and west, the river Sira and the Åna fjord lie to the southeast (separating it from Flekkefjord Municipality in Agder county), Lund Municipality lies to the east and north, and Eigersund Municipality lies to the northwest. The lakes Grøsfjellvatnet and Eiavatnet both lie on the northern border of the municipality. The coastline of Sokndal Municipality is fairly smooth, although there are two larger fjords which cut into the municipality: the Rekefjord and Jøssingfjorden. The Lille Presteskjær Lighthouse marks the entrance to the Rekefjord. The southeastern part of the municipality is very rocky and rugged. As part of Magma Geopark, much of the landscape is characteristic and open. It is the site of the large Tellnes mine, a large producer of titanium.

=== Climate ===
Climate data for Hauge
Month	Jan	Feb	Mar	Apr	May	Jun	Jul	Aug	Sep	Oct	Nov	Dec	Year
Daily mean °C (°F)	−0.3 (31.5)	−0.5 (31.1)	1.6 (34.9)	4.7 (40.5)	9.7 (49.5)	13.1 (55.6)	14.6 (58.3)	14.4 (57.9)	11.3 (52.3)	8.2 (46.8)	3.9 (39.0)	0.9 (33.6)	6.8 (44.2)
Average precipitation mm (inches)	150 (5.9)	105 (4.1)	120 (4.7)	85 (3.3)	93 (3.7)	98 (3.9)	118 (4.6)	150 (5.9)	190 (7.5)	210 (8.3)	193 (7.6)	163 (6.4)	1,675 (65.9)
Source: Norwegian Meteorological Institute

== Economy ==
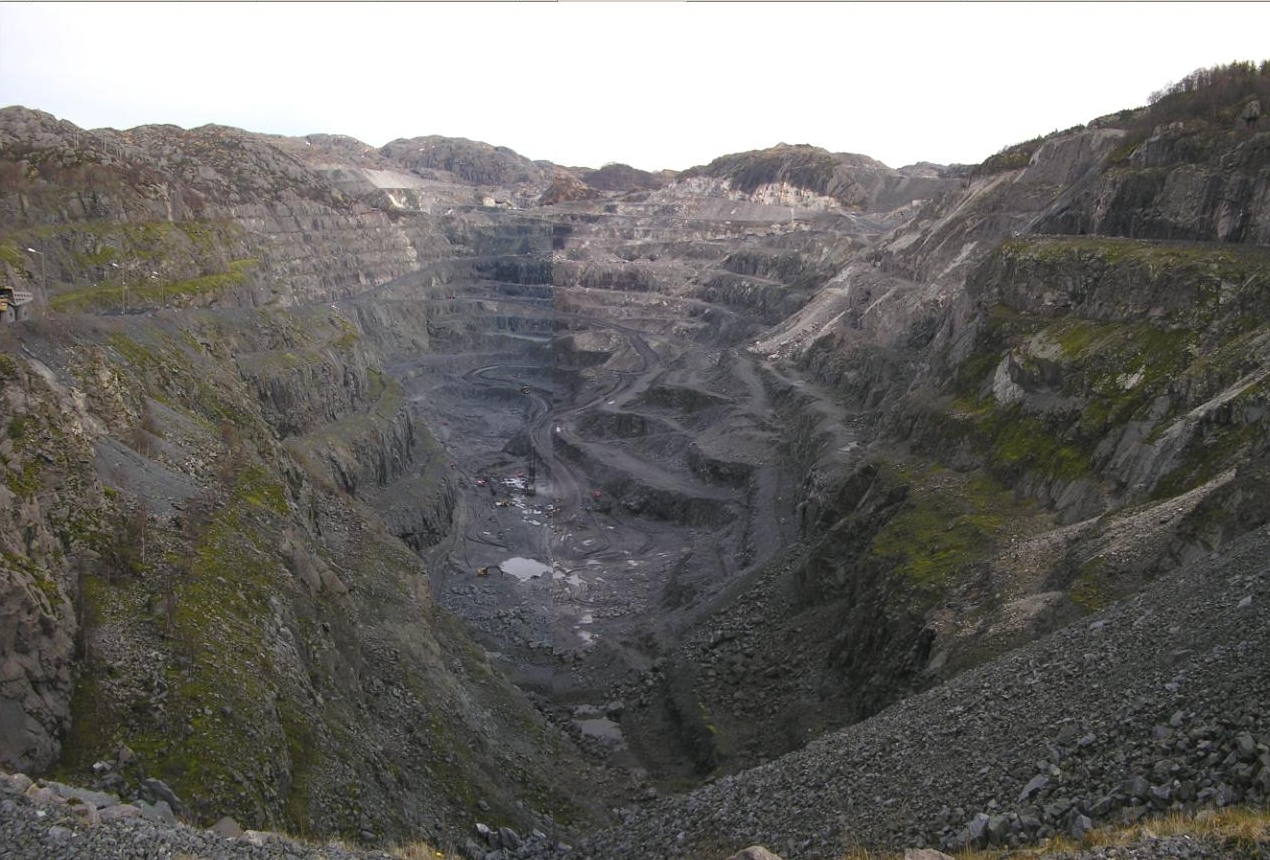
Tellnes opencast Ilmenite mine

At Tellnes, just east of the village of Hauge, there is an ilmenite mine run by Titania AS, supplying 10% of the world production of ilmenite (a type of titanium). It's also the world's largest opencast ilmenite mine.

== Government ==
Sokndal Municipality is responsible for primary education (through 10th grade), outpatient health services, senior citizen services, welfare and other social services, zoning, economic development, and municipal roads and utilities. The municipality is governed by a municipal council of directly elected representatives. The mayor is indirectly elected by a vote of the municipal council. The municipality is under the jurisdiction of the Sør-Rogaland District Court and the Gulating Court of Appeal.

=== Municipal council ===
The municipal council (Kommunestyre) of Sokndal Municipality is made up of 21 representatives that are elected to four year terms. The tables below show the current and historical composition of the council by political party.

Sokndal kommunestyre 2023–2027
Party name (in Norwegian)	Number of representatives
Labour Party (Arbeiderpartiet)	4
Progress Party (Fremskrittspartiet)	3
Conservative Party (Høyre)	2
Christian Democratic Party (Kristelig Folkeparti)	6
Red Party (Rødt)	1
Centre Party (Senterpartiet)	3
Liberal Party (Venstre)	2
Total number of members:	21

Sokndal kommunestyre 2019–2023
Party name (in Norwegian)	Number of representatives
Labour Party (Arbeiderpartiet)	5
Progress Party (Fremskrittspartiet)	2
Conservative Party (Høyre)	2
Christian Democratic Party (Kristelig Folkeparti)	5
Centre Party (Senterpartiet)	3
Liberal Party (Venstre)	1
Sokndal List (Sokndal Listo)	3
Total number of members:	21

Sokndal kommunestyre 2015–2019
Party name (in Norwegian)	Number of representatives
Labour Party (Arbeiderpartiet)	7
Progress Party (Fremskrittspartiet)	2
Conservative Party (Høyre)	3
Christian Democratic Party (Kristelig Folkeparti)	6
Centre Party (Senterpartiet)	1
Liberal Party (Venstre)	2
Total number of members:	21

Sokndal kommunestyre 2011–2015
Party name (in Norwegian)	Number of representatives
Labour Party (Arbeiderpartiet)	6
Progress Party (Fremskrittspartiet)	4
Conservative Party (Høyre)	4
Christian Democratic Party (Kristelig Folkeparti)	4
Centre Party (Senterpartiet)	1
Liberal Party (Venstre)	2
Total number of members:	21

Sokndal kommunestyre 2007–2011
Party name (in Norwegian)	Number of representatives
Labour Party (Arbeiderpartiet)	7
Progress Party (Fremskrittspartiet)	6
Conservative Party (Høyre)	2
Christian Democratic Party (Kristelig Folkeparti)	3
Centre Party (Senterpartiet)	1
Liberal Party (Venstre)	2
Total number of members:	21

Sokndal kommunestyre 2003–2007
Party name (in Norwegian)	Number of representatives
Labour Party (Arbeiderpartiet)	6
Progress Party (Fremskrittspartiet)	6
Conservative Party (Høyre)	2
Christian Democratic Party (Kristelig Folkeparti)	3
Centre Party (Senterpartiet)	2
Socialist Left Party (Sosialistisk Venstreparti)	1
Liberal Party (Venstre)	1
Total number of members:	21

Sokndal kommunestyre 1999–2003
Party name (in Norwegian)	Number of representatives
Labour Party (Arbeiderpartiet)	7
Progress Party (Fremskrittspartiet)	4
Conservative Party (Høyre)	2
Christian Democratic Party (Kristelig Folkeparti)	4
Centre Party (Senterpartiet)	2
Liberal Party (Venstre)	2
Total number of members:	21

Sokndal kommunestyre 1995–1999
Party name (in Norwegian)	Number of representatives
Labour Party (Arbeiderpartiet)	6
Progress Party (Fremskrittspartiet)	3
Conservative Party (Høyre)	3
Christian Democratic Party (Kristelig Folkeparti)	4
Centre Party (Senterpartiet)	3
Liberal Party (Venstre)	1
Retirees' and disabled people's non-party list (Pensjonister og uføretrygdedes upolitiske liste)	1
Total number of members:	21

Sokndal kommunestyre 1991–1995
Party name (in Norwegian)	Number of representatives
Labour Party (Arbeiderpartiet)	6
Progress Party (Fremskrittspartiet)	2
Conservative Party (Høyre)	3
Christian Democratic Party (Kristelig Folkeparti)	5
Centre Party (Senterpartiet)	3
Liberal Party (Venstre)	1
Retirees' and disabled people's non-party list (Pensjonister og uføretrygdedes upolitiske liste)	1
Total number of members:	21

Sokndal kommunestyre 1987–1991
Party name (in Norwegian)	Number of representatives
Labour Party (Arbeiderpartiet)	7
Progress Party (Fremskrittspartiet)	2
Conservative Party (Høyre)	5
Christian Democratic Party (Kristelig Folkeparti)	5
Centre Party (Senterpartiet)	1
Liberal Party (Venstre)	1
Total number of members:	21

Sokndal kommunestyre 1983–1987
Party name (in Norwegian)	Number of representatives
Labour Party (Arbeiderpartiet)	7
Progress Party (Fremskrittspartiet)	2
Conservative Party (Høyre)	5
Christian Democratic Party (Kristelig Folkeparti)	4
Centre Party (Senterpartiet)	2
Liberal Party (Venstre)	1
Total number of members:	21

Sokndal kommunestyre 1979–1983
Party name (in Norwegian)	Number of representatives
Labour Party (Arbeiderpartiet)	6
Conservative Party (Høyre)	5
Christian Democratic Party (Kristelig Folkeparti)	6
New People's Party (Nye Folkepartiet)	1
Centre Party (Senterpartiet)	2
Liberal Party (Venstre)	1
Total number of members:	21

Sokndal kommunestyre 1975–1979
Party name (in Norwegian)	Number of representatives
Labour Party (Arbeiderpartiet)	4
Conservative Party (Høyre)	3
Christian Democratic Party (Kristelig Folkeparti)	6
New People's Party (Nye Folkepartiet)	2
Centre Party (Senterpartiet)	5
Socialist Left Party (Sosialistisk Venstreparti)	1
Total number of members:	21

Sokndal kommunestyre 1971–1975
Party name (in Norwegian)	Number of representatives
Labour Party (Arbeiderpartiet)	6
Conservative Party (Høyre)	2
Christian Democratic Party (Kristelig Folkeparti)	4
Centre Party (Senterpartiet)	6
Liberal Party (Venstre)	3
Total number of members:	21

Sokndal kommunestyre 1967–1971
Party name (in Norwegian)	Number of representatives
Labour Party (Arbeiderpartiet)	6
Conservative Party (Høyre)	2
Christian Democratic Party (Kristelig Folkeparti)	2
Centre Party (Senterpartiet)	4
Liberal Party (Venstre)	5
Local List(s) (Lokale lister)	2
Total number of members:	21

Sokndal kommunestyre 1963–1967
Party name (in Norwegian)	Number of representatives
Labour Party (Arbeiderpartiet)	6
Christian Democratic Party (Kristelig Folkeparti)	3
Centre Party (Senterpartiet)	4
Liberal Party (Venstre)	5
Local List(s) (Lokale lister)	3
Total number of members:	21

Sokndal herredsstyre 1959–1963
Party name (in Norwegian)	Number of representatives
Labour Party (Arbeiderpartiet)	5
Christian Democratic Party (Kristelig Folkeparti)	4
Centre Party (Senterpartiet)	3
Liberal Party (Venstre)	5
Local List(s) (Lokale lister)	4
Total number of members:	21

Sokndal herredsstyre 1955–1959
Party name (in Norwegian)	Number of representatives
Labour Party (Arbeiderpartiet)	5
Christian Democratic Party (Kristelig Folkeparti)	3
Farmers' Party (Bondepartiet)	4
Liberal Party (Venstre)	5
Local List(s) (Lokale lister)	4
Total number of members:	21

Sokndal herredsstyre 1951–1955
Party name (in Norwegian)	Number of representatives
Labour Party (Arbeiderpartiet)	4
Christian Democratic Party (Kristelig Folkeparti)	3
Liberal Party (Venstre)	7
Joint List(s) of Non-Socialist Parties (Borgerlige Felleslister)	5
Local List(s) (Lokale lister)	1
Total number of members:	20

Sokndal herredsstyre 1947–1951
Party name (in Norwegian)	Number of representatives
Labour Party (Arbeiderpartiet)	3
Christian Democratic Party (Kristelig Folkeparti)	3
Liberal Party (Venstre)	8
List of workers, fishermen, and small farmholders (Arbeidere, fiskere, småbrukere liste)	1
Joint List(s) of Non-Socialist Parties (Borgerlige Felleslister)	5
Total number of members:	20

Sokndal herredsstyre 1945–1947
Party name (in Norwegian)	Number of representatives
Labour Party (Arbeiderpartiet)	7
Joint List(s) of Non-Socialist Parties (Borgerlige Felleslister)	12
Local List(s) (Lokale lister)	3
Total number of members:	22

Sokndal herredsstyre 1937–1941*
Party name (in Norwegian)	Number of representatives
Labour Party (Arbeiderpartiet)	4
Joint List(s) of Non-Socialist Parties (Borgerlige Felleslister)	11
Local List(s) (Lokale lister)	5
Total number of members:	20
Note: Due to the German occupation of Norway during World War II, no elections were held for new municipal councils until after the war ended in 1945.

=== Mayors ===
The mayor (Nynorsk: ordførar) of Sokndal Municipality is the political leader of the municipality and the chairperson of the municipal council. The following people have held this position:

- 1838–1839: Hans Jakob Jakobsen Aarstad
- 1840–1843: Peder Andreas Nielsen
- 1844–1847: Jakob Berntsen Bruun
- 1848–1851: Rev. Christian Selmer
- 1852–1853: Tønnes Watland Fredrichsen
- 1854–1857: Hans Jakob Jakobsen Aarstad
- 1858–1861: Rev. Magnus Christian Jürgens
- 1862–1863: Hans Jakob Jakobsen Aarstad
- 1864–1871: Gabriel Jacobsen Kirsebom
- 1872–1877: Jørgen Hansen Aarstad
- 1878–1881: Tønnes Torkelsen Løvaas
- 1882–1883: Jørgen Hansen Aarstad
- 1884–1887: Gabriel Gundersen Eia
- 1888–1891: Jørgen Hansen Aarstad
- 1892–1898: Gunder Tønnessen Egeland
- 1899–1901: Jørgen Hansen Aarstad
- 1902–1907: Anton Jenssen Barstad
- 1908–1916: Lars Jonassen Line
- 1917–1919: Olaus Tollaksen Støle
- 1920–1935: Severin Mellgren (LL)
- 1935–1937: Elias Barstad (LL)
- 1937–1941: Severin Mellgren (LL)
- 1942–1945: Sigfried Lund (NS)
- 1945–1945: Severin Mellgren (LL)
- 1946–1951: Håkon B. Mellgren (LL)
- 1951–1955: Thorleif Brandsberg (V)
- 1955–1959: Olaus Haneberg (Bp)
- 1959–1963: Iver Andersen (V)
- 1963–1967: Håkon B. Mellgren (LL)
- 1967–1971: Sven Jonsen (V)
- 1971–1975: Claus Egil Feyling (H)
- 1975–1979: Harald Ribland (Sp)
- 1979–1981: Kjell Rek (KrF)
- 1981–1983: Odd Erling Midtbø (H)
- 1983–1987: Harald Ribland (Sp)
- 1987–1991: Randulf Skretting (KrF)
- 1991–1995: Torleif P. Støle (Ap)
- 1995–1999: Randulf Skretting (KrF)
- 1999–2007: Gudmund Nikolai Holmen (Ap)
- 2007–2011: Dag Sørensen (Ap)
- 2011–2019: Trond Arne Pedersen (KrF)
- 2019–2023: Jonas Andersen Sayed (KrF)
- 2023–present: Bjørn-Inge Mydland (Sp)

== Notable people ==
- Carl Adolph Dahl (1769 at Aave in Rekefjord – 1819), a Norwegian jurist and politician
- Hans Reidar Holtermann (1895 in Sokndal - 1966), a military officer who commanded of Hegra Fortress in WWII
- Rolf Johan Lenschow (1928 in Hauge i Dalane – 2014), a civil engineer and professor in concrete construction
- Frank Tønnesen (born 1972 in Sokndal), a singer-songwriter and guitarist who goes by the stage name Tønes
- Anne Tønnessen (born 1974 in Sokndal), a football player and Olympic champion
- Vibeke Stene (born 1978 in Sokndal), a gothic metal soprano and actress
- Siri Seglem (born 1983 in Sokndal), a handball player with 23 caps with Norway women
