= Jøssingfjorden =

Fjord in Rogaland, Norway

- Jøssingfjord (unofficial)
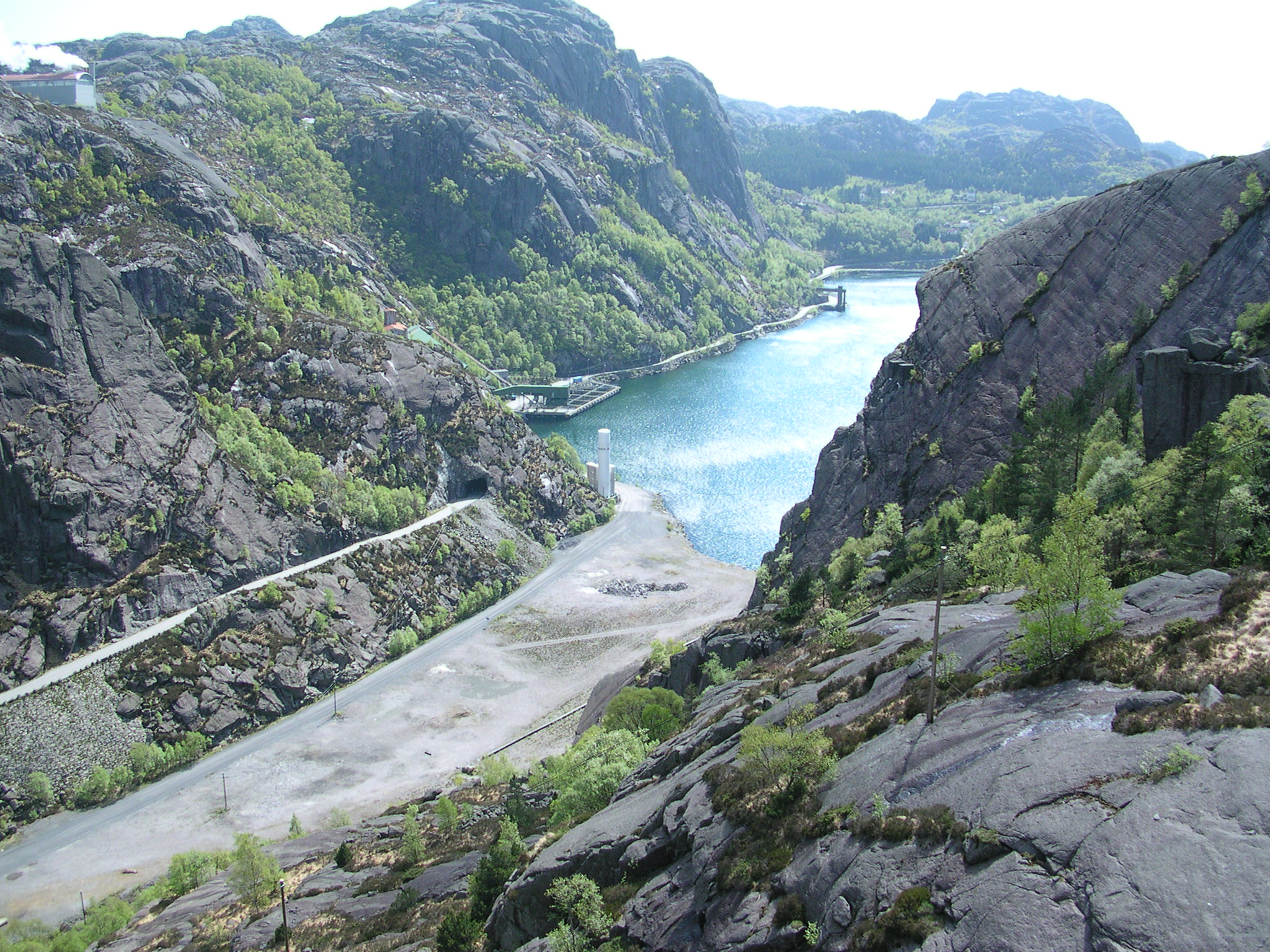
- View of the fjord
- Interactive map of the fjord
- Location: Rogaland county, Norway
- Coordinates: 58.31946°N 6.33882°E
- Type: Fjord
- Primary outflows: North Sea
- Basin countries: Norway
- Max. length: 3 kilometres (1.9 mi)

Jøssingfjorden is a fjord in Sokndal Municipality in Rogaland county, Norway. The 3-kilometre (1.9 mi) long fjord is narrow and deep and is surrounded by mountains. It sits about 4 kilometres (2.5 mi) southeast of the municipal centre of Hauge. There is some settlement on the southeastern side of the fjord: the villages of Jøssingfjord, Li, Vinterstø, and Bu. There is a road that runs along the southeast coast of the fjord, with sharp hairpin turns leading down from the mountains to the shore of the fjord both heading north and south from the fjord.

The Tellnes mine, one of Norway's largest titanium mines, is located in the mountains about 4 kilometres (2.5 mi) northeast of the fjord. The mine is run by a company called Titania, and the fjord is used as the shipping port for the company. Located at the head of the fjord, the Nedre Helleren Power Plant generates electricity from water stored in mountain lakes. The water is channeled through pipes down to the power plant at sea level, where the force of its descent drives turbines to produce electricity.

At the head of the fjord is the small Helleren farm which is now abandoned. It sits in a narrow valley with steep rock cliffs on two sides, a rock scree on the third side, and the fjord on the fourth side. The base of one of the rock cliffs stops about 8 metres (26 ft) above the ground forming a rock shelter, or heller (hence the name of the farm). The farm is preserved and is now owned by the Dalane folk museum.

== History ==
The fjord is well known as the location of the World War II-era Altmark incident. On 16 February 1940, the British destroyer HMS Cossack managed to free prisoners taken by the German cruiser Admiral Graf Spee from the German tanker Altmark.

After this incident in the Jøssingfjorden, the term Jøssing came to mean a Norwegian patriot, the opposite of a Quisling (or traitor). The Norwegian collaborator government tried to neutralize their nickname Quislings by using the Jøssingfjord event to coin a derogatory term Jøssing, referring to "anti-nazis". This attempt backfired, as it was quickly appropriated as a positive term by the Norwegian populace, and in 1943 the word was banned from official use. As a consequence, the best known illegal Norwegian newspaper got its name from the same incident: Jøssingposten (The Jøssing Post).

== Media gallery ==
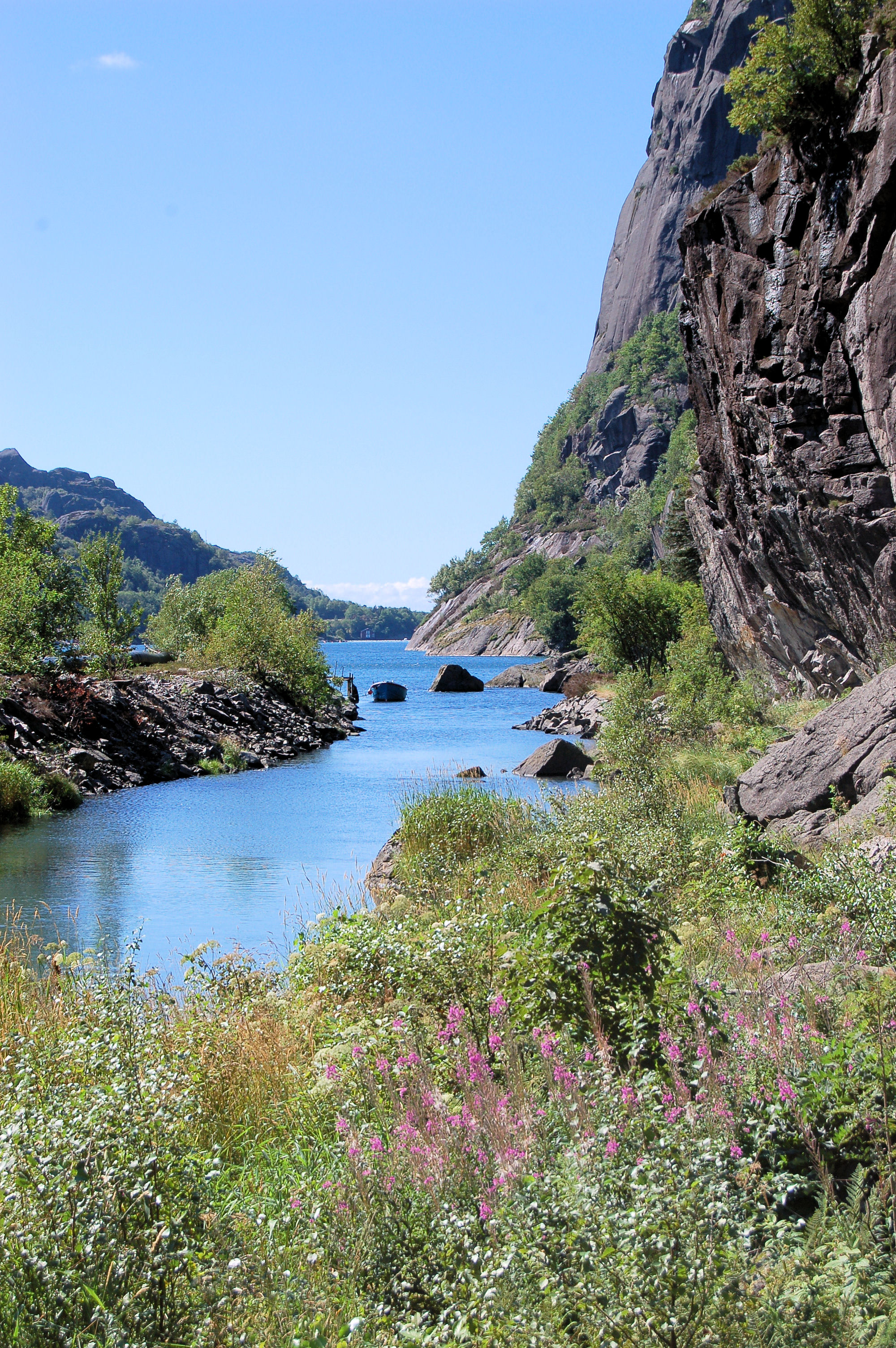
Head of the fjord

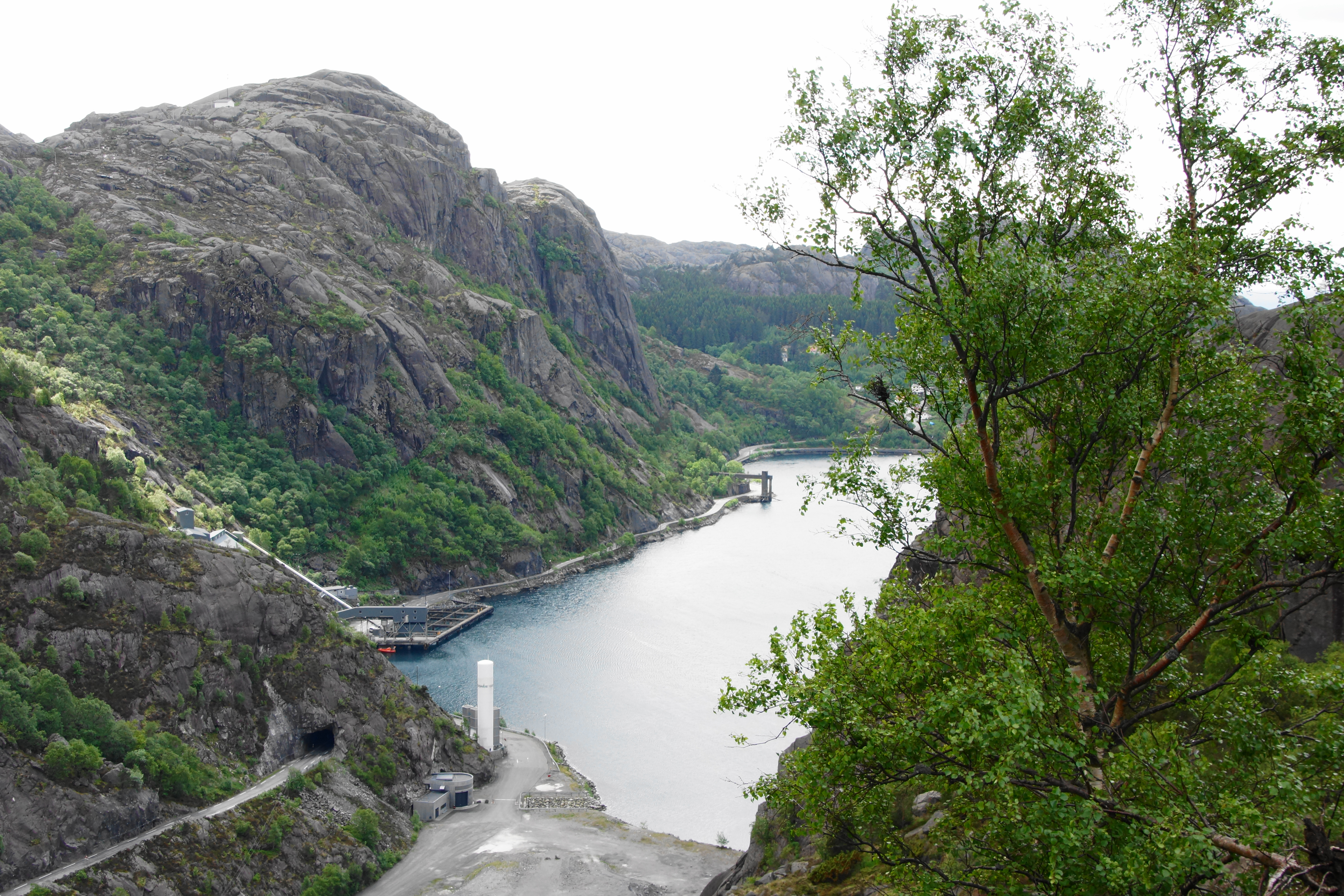
Head of the fjord, view of the shipping port

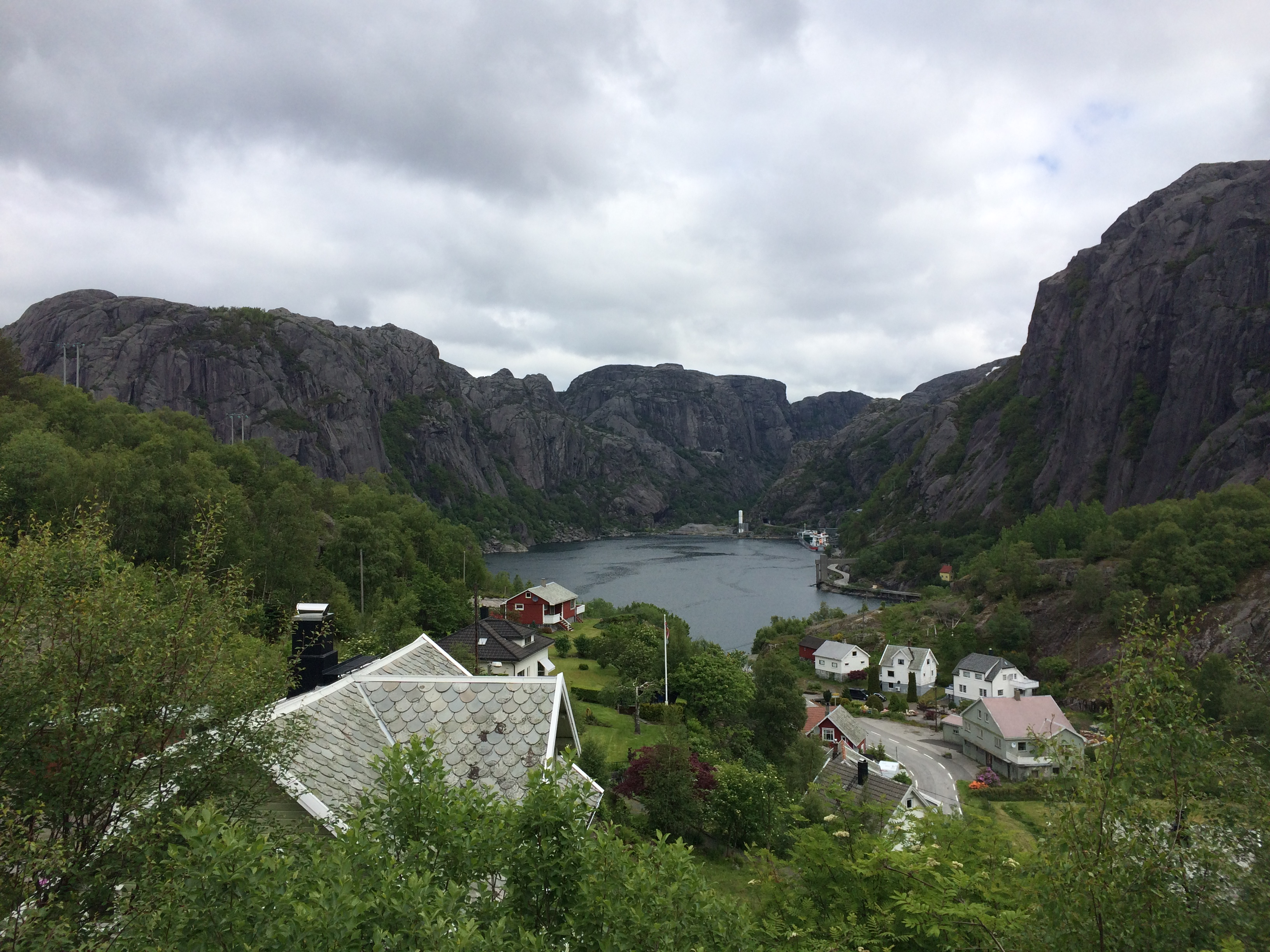
Looking towards the head of the fjord

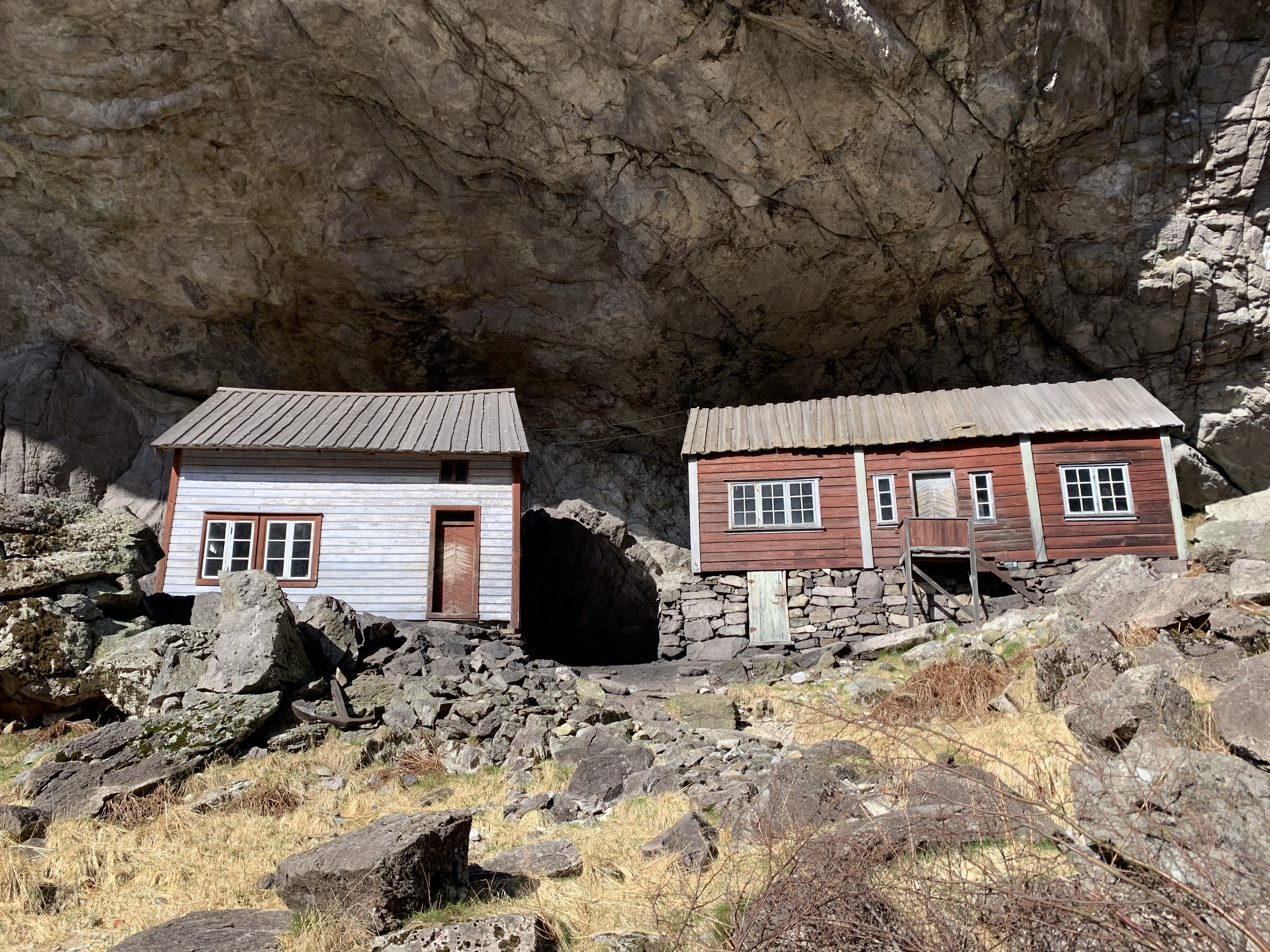
Helleren farm with two traditional houses from the 1800s built under the rock shelter
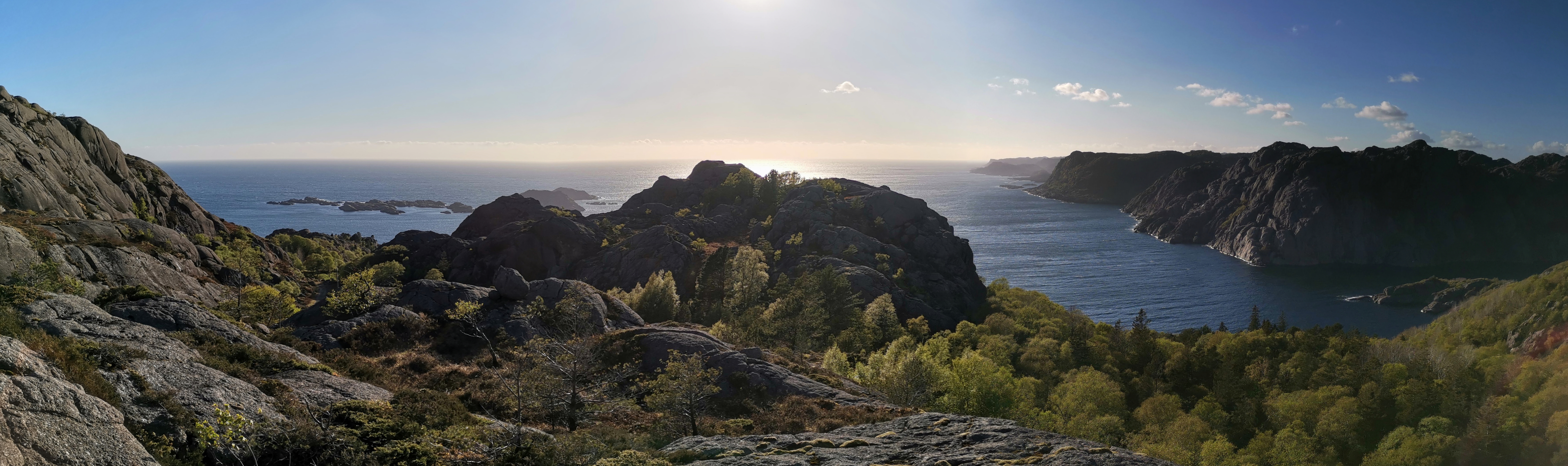
Dydland – the coast. The islands of the Store og Litle Fokksteinen nature reserve on the left, and the mouth of Jøssingfjorden on the right

== See also ==
- List of Norwegian fjords
