= Carl Adolph Dahl =

Norwegian politician (1769–1819)

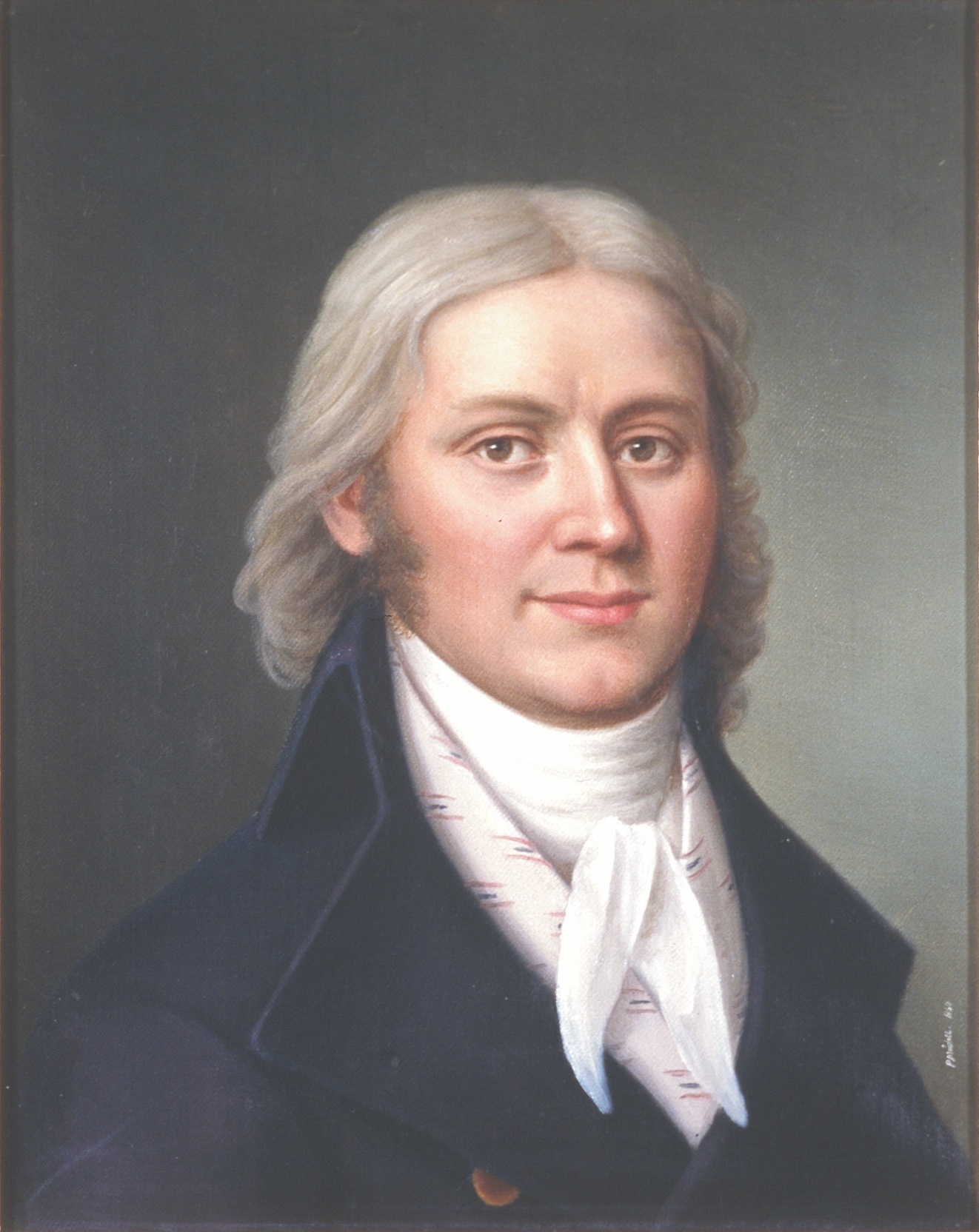
- Born: 12 August 1769; Rekefjord, Norway
- Died: 3 June 1819 (aged 49)
- Occupations: Jurist and politician
- Known for: Representative at the Norwegian Constitutional Assembly

Carl Adolph Dahl (12 August 1769 – 3 June 1819) was a Norwegian jurist and politician.

Carl Adolph Dahl was born at Aave in Rekefjord in what is now Sokndal Municipality in Rogaland county, Norway. Dahl graduated from the University of Copenhagen in 1791. He worked as town clerk, acting magistrate and judge in Fredrikshald in Østfold. In 1795, he became acting commissioner in Fredrikshald. In 1797, he served as councilman and in 1798 judge in Tune and Veme. He also became Bailiff and town clerk in Tonsberg. In 1803, Dahl was bailiff in Fredrikshald and moved back there where he was also the judge in Idd and Marker.

He represented Friderichshald (now Halden) at the Norwegian Constituent Assembly at Eidsvoll Manor in 1814.He was elected as a member of the Parliament of Norway in 1817.

Carl Adolph Dahl was married to Johanne Theodora Stang (1780-1835). They bought the Vevlen farm (Vevlen gård på Idd) in 1808. They were the grandparents of Carl Adolf Dahl (1828-1907), who was the city engineer of Trondheim. Dahl was awarded Knighthood in the Order of the Dannebrog in 1810 and Order of the Polar Star in 1815.

== Related Reading ==
- Holme Jørn (2014) De kom fra alle kanter - Eidsvollsmennene og deres hus (Oslo: Cappelen Damm) ISBN 978-82-02-44564-5
