= Rolf Johan Lenschow =

Norwegian civil engineer

Rolf Johan Lenschow (9 August 1928 – 24 April 2014) was a Norwegian civil engineer.

He was born in Hauge i Dalane. He graduated from the Norwegian Institute of Technology in 1954 took his PhD in 1966 at the University of Illinois at Urbana-Champaign. He became professor in concrete construction at the Norwegian Institute of Technology in 1968, and later served as rector of the University of Trondheim from 1987 to 1993. He was a member of the Norwegian Academy of Technological Sciences.

Academic offices
Preceded by Jørn Sandnes	Rector of the University of Trondheim; 1987–1993	Succeeded by
