= Rekefjord =

Village in Sokndal Municipality, Norway

Rekefjord Rægefjord (historic)
- Village
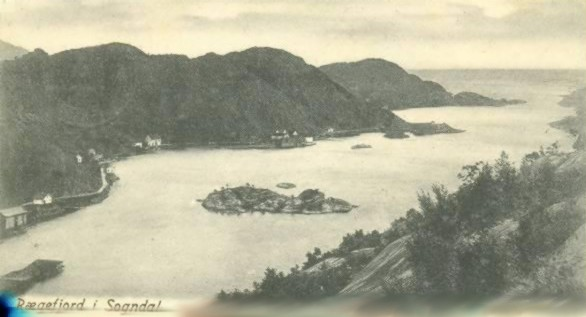
- View of the village from a 1910 postcard
- Interactive map of Rekefjord
- Coordinates: 58.33556°N 6.26331°E
- Country: Norway
- Region: Western Norway
- County: Rogaland
- District: Dalane
- Municipality: Sokndal Municipality
- Elevation: 1 m (3.3 ft)
- Time zone: UTC+01:00 (CET)
  - Summer (DST): UTC+02:00 (CEST)
- Post Code: 4380 Hauge i Dalane

Rekefjord is a harbour village in Sokndal Municipality in Rogaland county, Norway. The village is located around the Rekefjord, about 1 kilometre (0.62 mi) west of the municipal centre of Hauge i Dalane. The village of Sogndalsstranda lies about 2 kilometres (1.2 mi) southeast of Rekefjord.

The Lille Presteskjær Lighthouse is located at the mouth of the fjord, just south of the village. A railway line was constructed in the 1860s for bringing ore from the Blåfjell Mines to Rekefjord for shipment. The railway has since closed and today it is a pedestrian and bicycle path.

== History ==
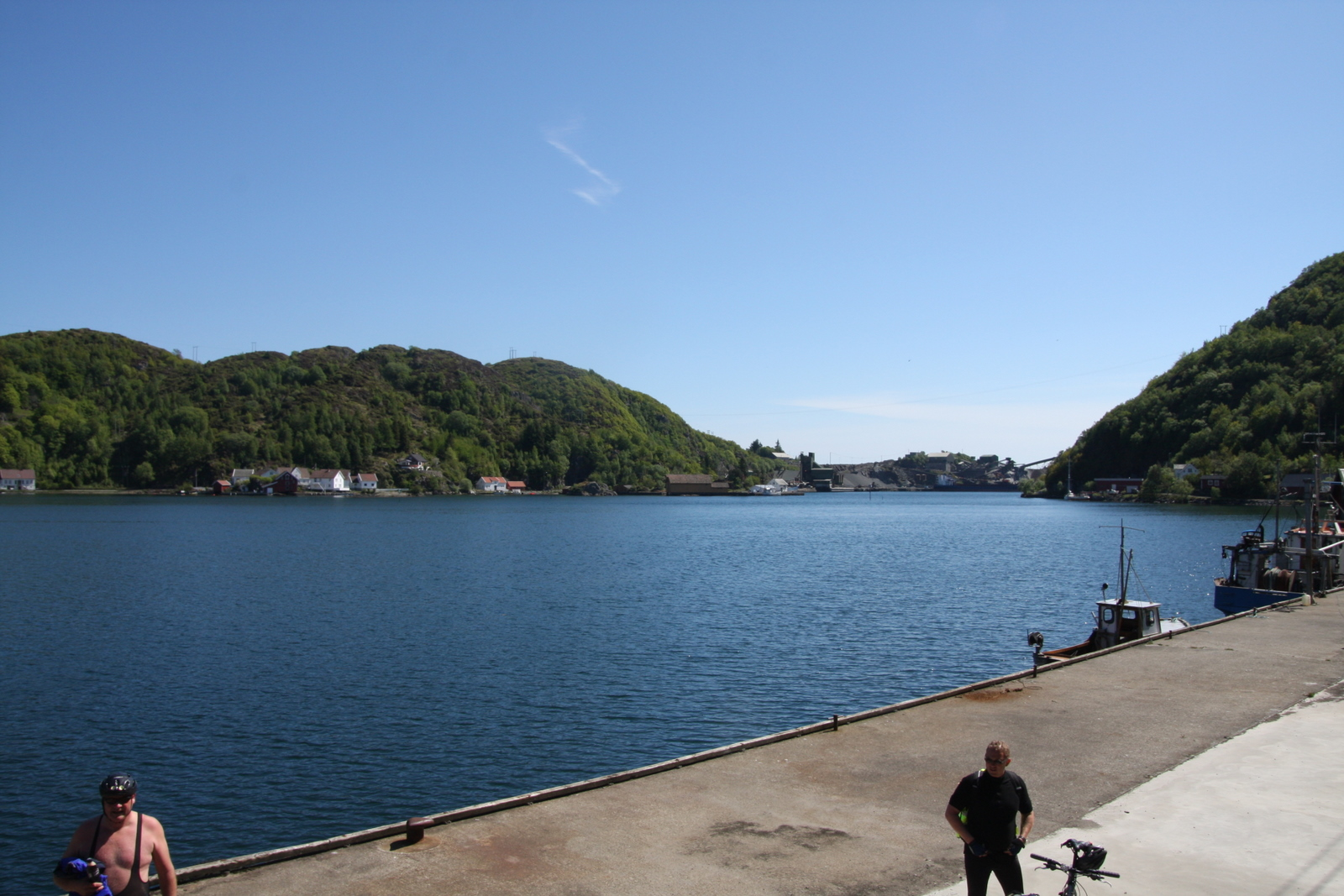
View from Rekefjord

The villages of Sogndalsstranda and Rekefjord are located near each other and together, they were granted ladested rights in 1798. Together this two-point ladested was called Sogndal (historically spelled "Soggendahl"). This status gave them a monopoly on import and export of goods and materials in the port and in the surrounding district. On 1 January 1838, all of Norway was divided up into municipalities according to the formannskapsdistrikt law. The ladested of Sogndal was initially part of Sogndal Municipality (Norwegian: Sogndal herred; later spelled Sokndal).

In 1845, the ladested was separated from Sogndal Municipality and became the new Sogndal ladested. Initially, Sogndal ladested had a population of 348 while Sogndal Municipality had a population of 2,819. On 1 July 1944, Sogndal ladestad was reunited with Sokndal Municipality, losing its small seaport status. Prior to the merger Sogndal had a population of 311.
