= Tellnes mine =

Titanium mine in Norway

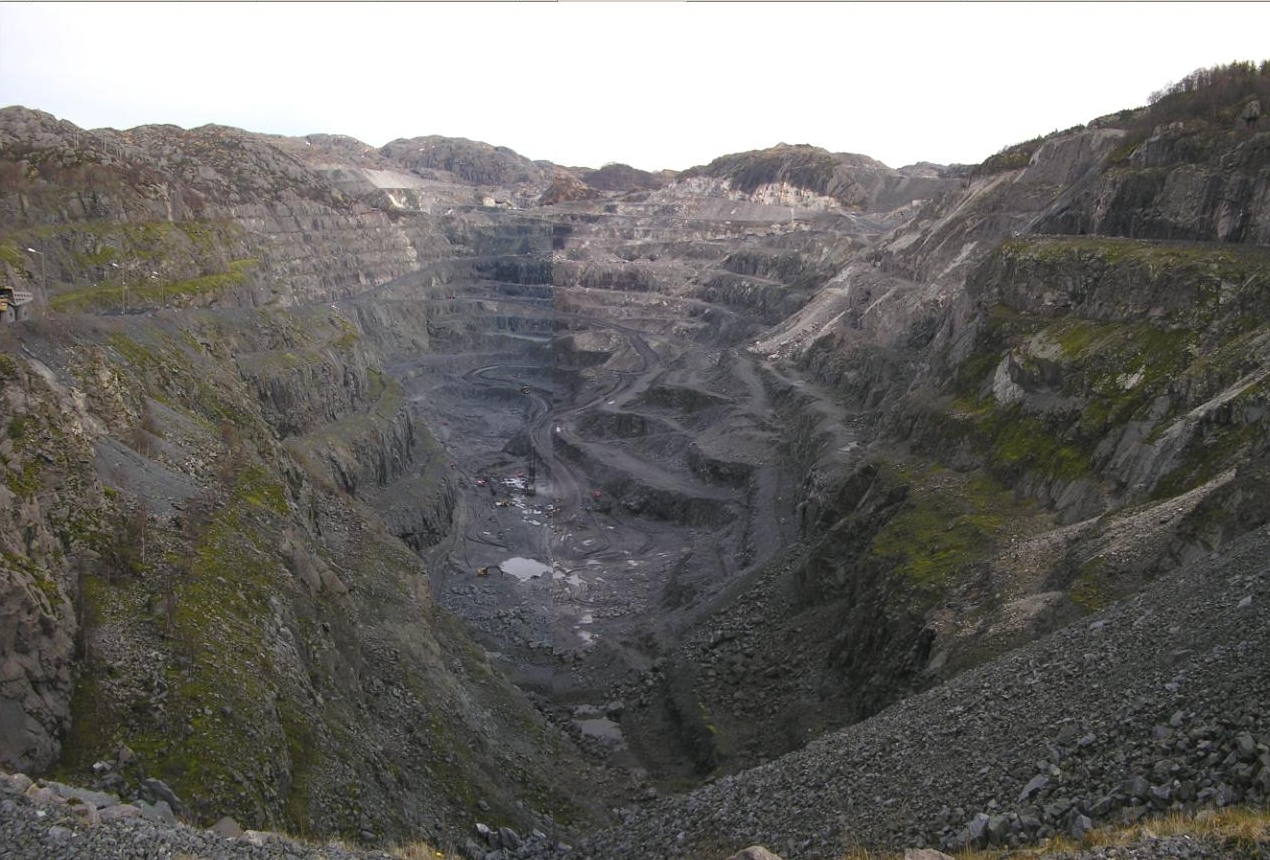
- View of the open pit mine
- Interactive map of Tellnes mine
- Location: Sokndal Municipality, Rogaland, Norway; 58°20′04″N 06°25′22″E
- Products: Ilmenite (titanium)
- Production: 580,000 tonnes (570,000 long tons; 640,000 short tons)
- Type: Open-pit
- Opened: 1960
- Company: Titania A/S

The Tellnes mine is one of the largest titanium mines in Europe. The mine is located about 4 kilometres (2.5 mi) northeast of the Jøssingfjorden in Sokndal Municipality in Rogaland county, Norway. The mine has reserves amounting more than 300,000,000 tonnes (300,000,000 long tons; 330,000,000 short tons) of ore grading 18% titanium. The deposit of titanium was discovered in 1954 and production at the mine began in October 1960. Each year there is about 2,000,000 tonnes (2,000,000 long tons; 2,200,000 short tons) of ore and 1,600,000 tonnes (1,600,000 long tons; 1,800,000 short tons) of rock waste removed from the open-pit mine. This resulted in about 580,000 tonnes (570,000 long tons; 640,000 short tons) of ilmenite concentrate from the mine in 1999.
