= Sokndal Church =

Church in Rogaland, Norway

- Sokndal kirke
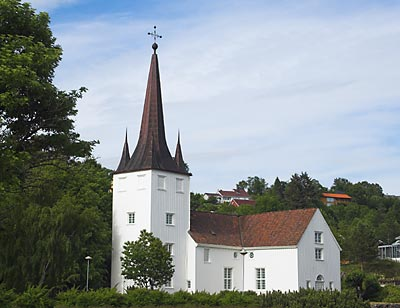
- View of the church
- Sokndal Church
- 58.345351°N 06.294643°E
- Location: Sokndal Municipality, Rogaland
- Country: Norway
- Denomination: Church of Norway
- Churchmanship: Evangelical Lutheran

History
- Status: Parish church
- Founded: 13th century
- Consecrated: 8 July 1807

Architecture
- Functional status: Active
- Architectural type: Cruciform
- Style: Louis XVI
- Completed: 1803 (223 years ago)

Specifications
- Capacity: 800
- Materials: Wood

Administration
- Diocese: Stavanger bispedømme
- Deanery: Dalane prosti
- Parish: Sokndal
- Norwegian Cultural Heritage Site
- Type: Church
- Status: Automatically protected
- ID: 85509

Sokndal Church (Norwegian: Sokndal kirke) is a parish church of the Church of Norway in Sokndal Municipality in Rogaland county, Norway. It is located in the village of Hauge. It is the main church for the Sokndal parish which is part of the Dalane prosti (deanery) in the Diocese of Stavanger. The white, wooden church was built in a cruciform design and in a Louis XVI style in 1803 using designs by an unknown architect. The church seats about 800 people.

== History ==
The earliest existing historical records of the church date back to the year 1307, but the church was not new at that time. Records from the 1600s refer to the church as Sankt Jakobs kirke, so it was likely dedicated to Saint Jacob. The medieval church stood on the site for centuries and over time it was renovated, repaired, and rebuilt. Records show that from 1734 to 1740, the church underwent an extensive renovation project to repair the very old church. It is likely that by then the church bared little resemblance to the original church but rather looked like a patchwork of old an old stave church and newer timber-framed construction. Around the turn of the 19th century, the old church was torn down and a new building was constructed on the same site. The new cruciform church was partially completed in 1803 when it was put into use. It was finished over the next four years and it was consecrated on 8 July 1807.

In 1814, this church served as an election church (Norwegian: valgkirke). Together with more than 300 other parish churches across Norway, it was a polling station for elections to the 1814 Norwegian Constituent Assembly which wrote the Constitution of Norway. This was Norway's first national elections. Each church parish was a constituency that elected people called "electors" who later met together in each county to elect the representatives for the assembly that was to meet at Eidsvoll Manor later that year.

== Media gallery ==
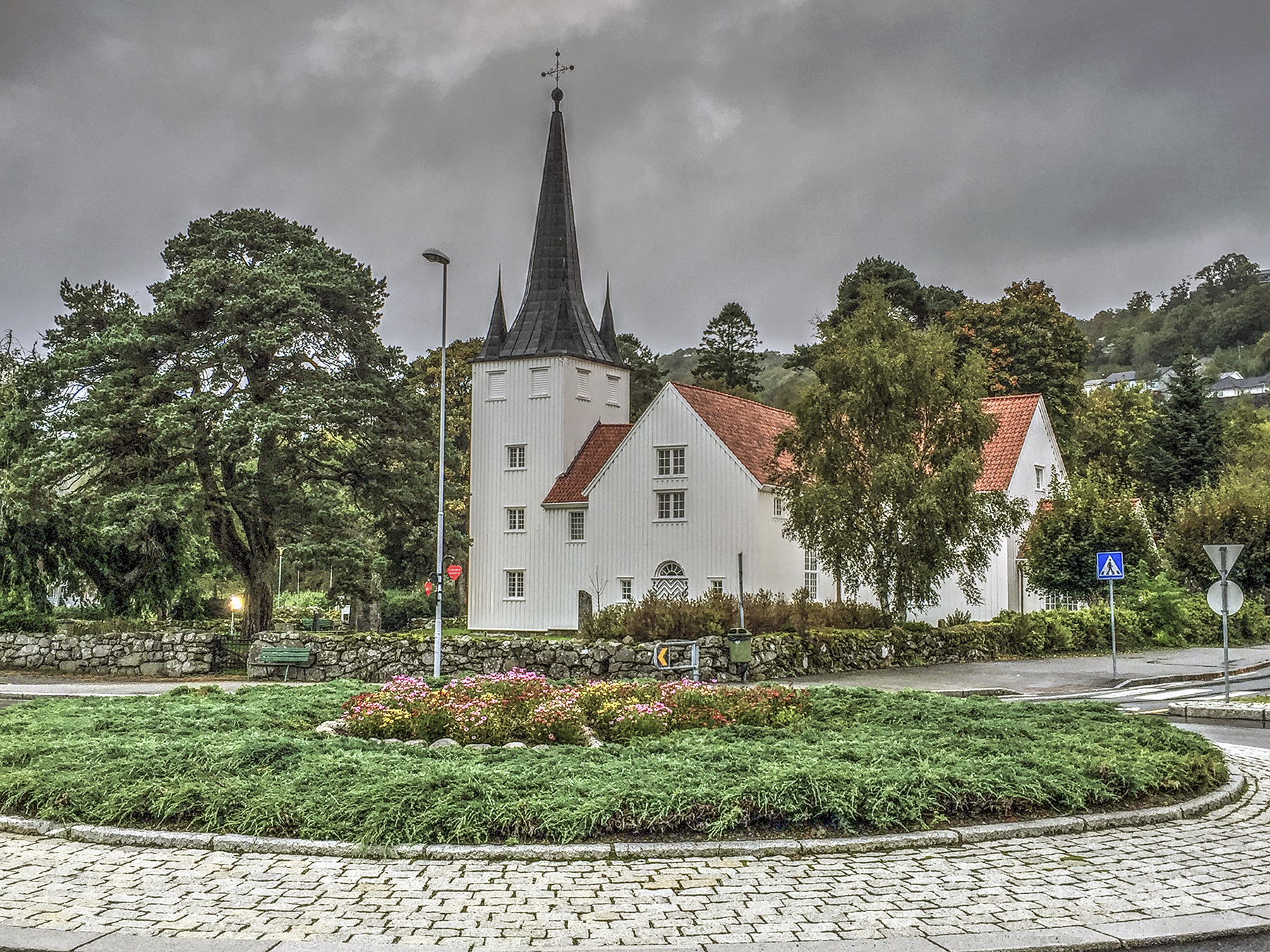

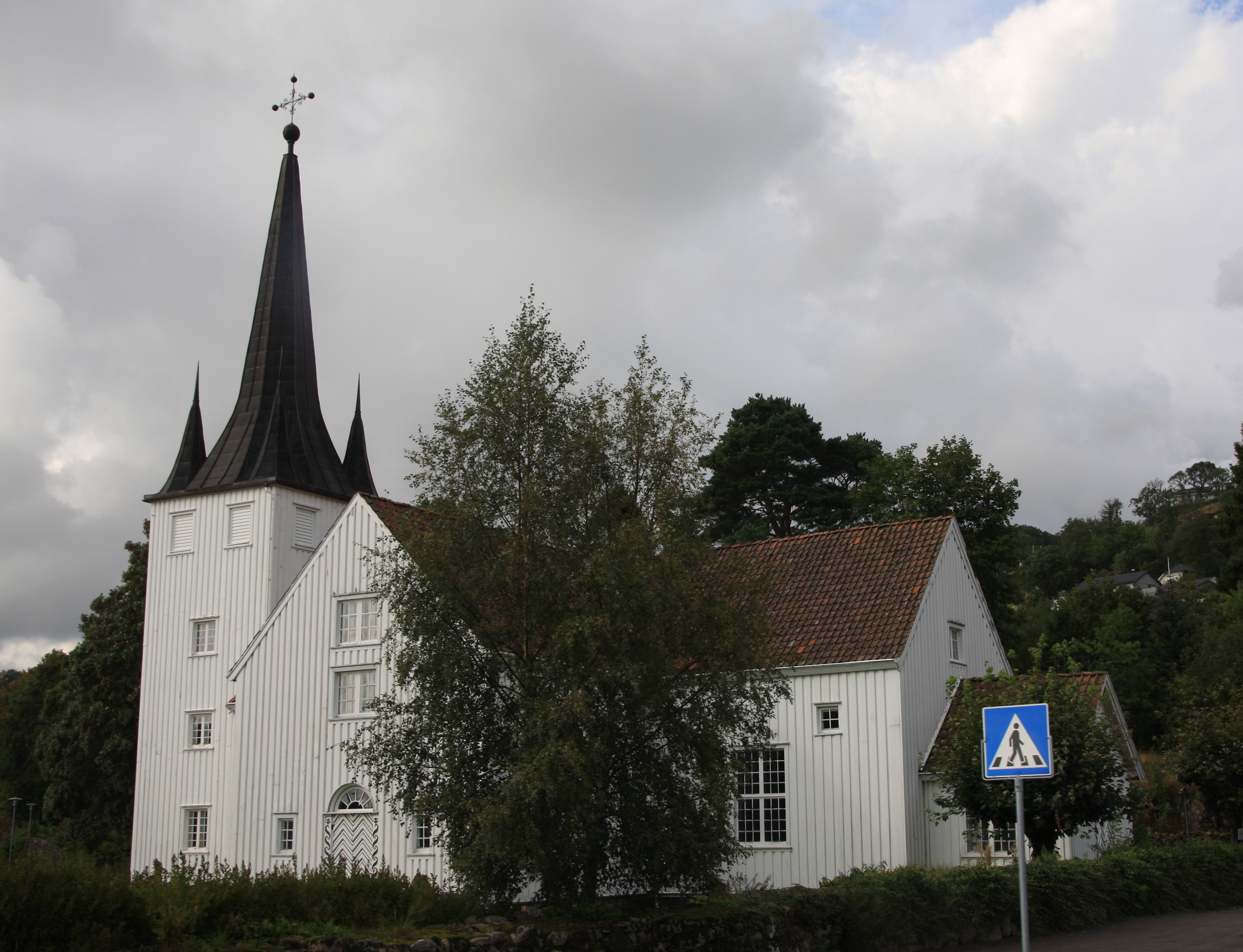

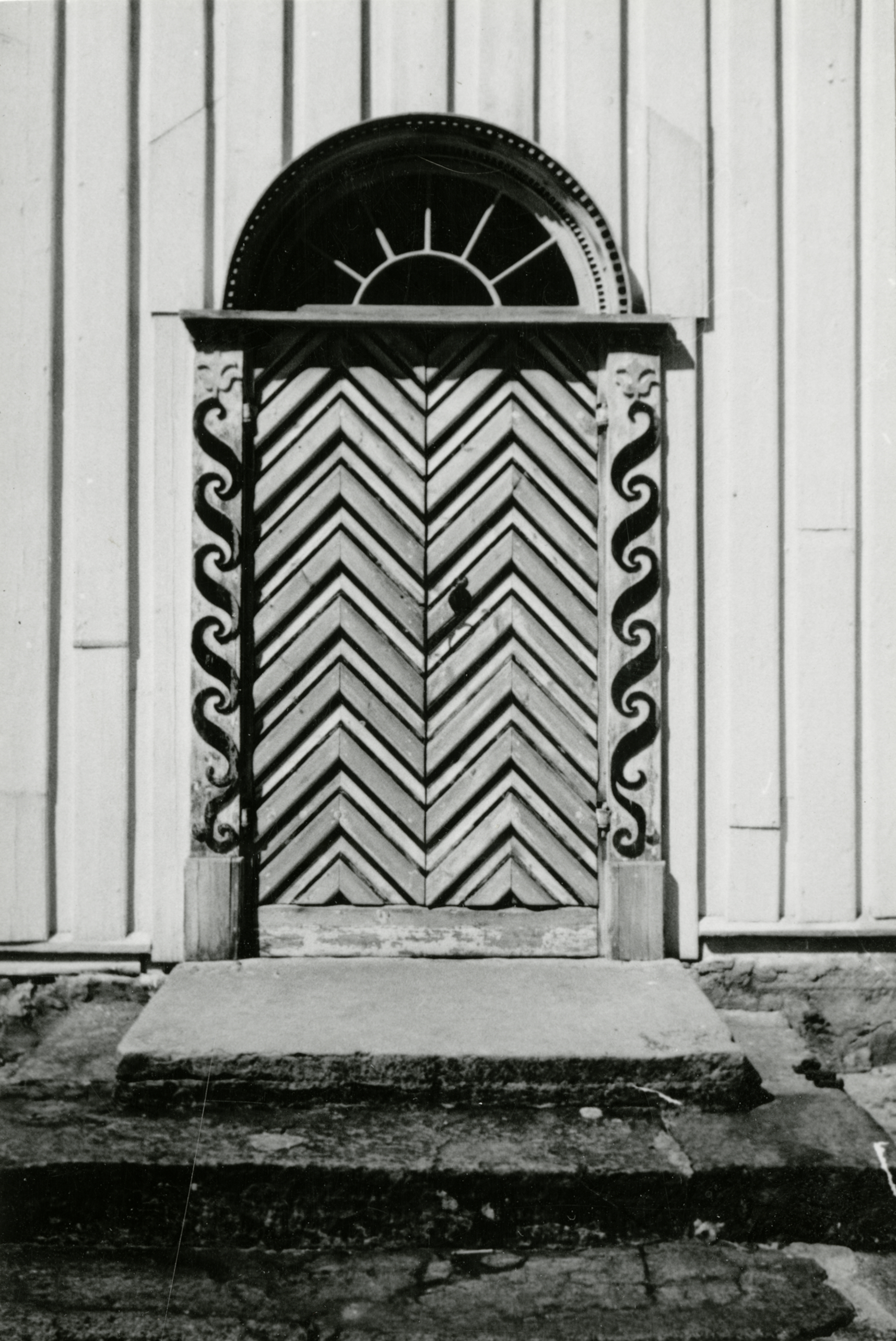

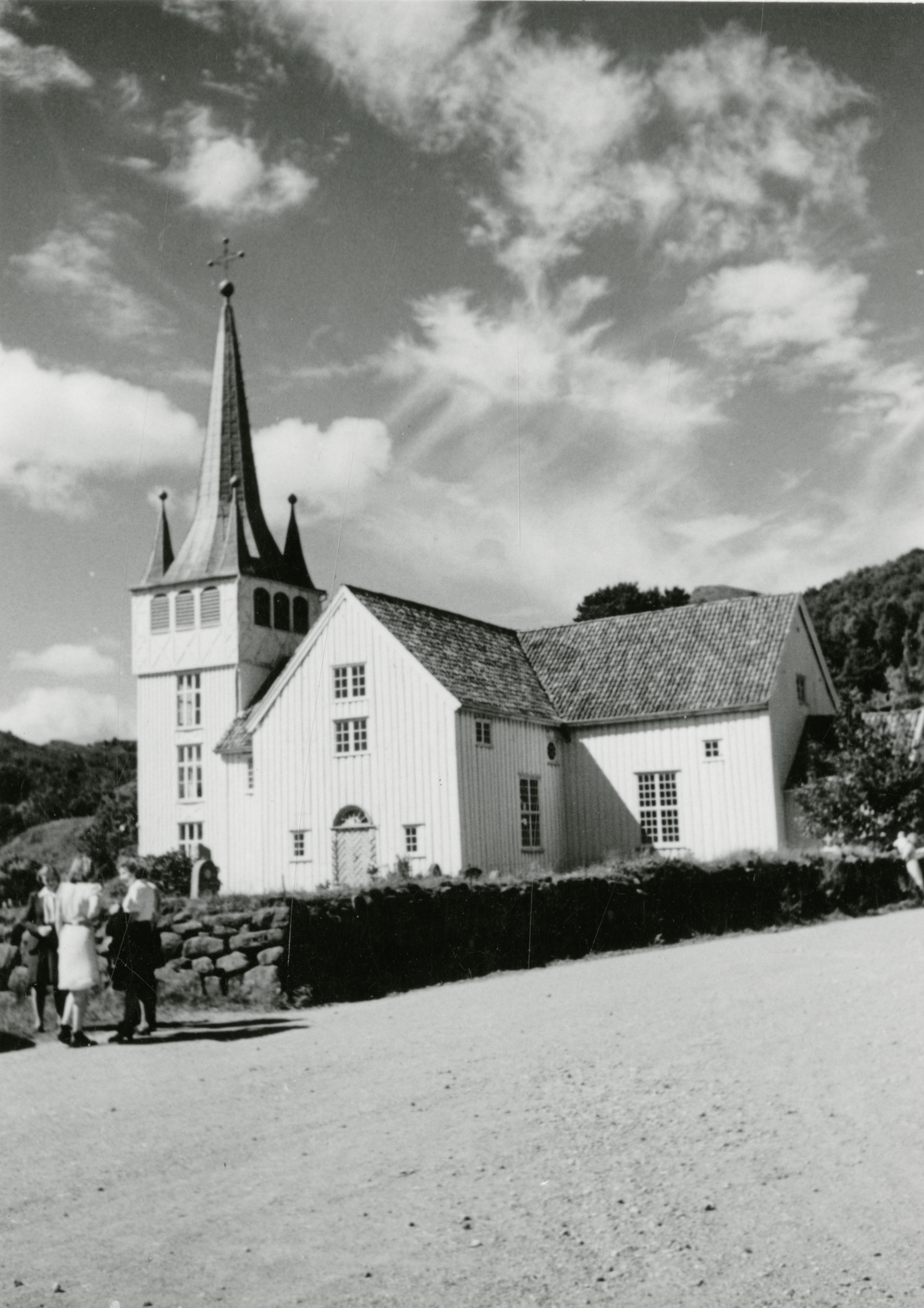

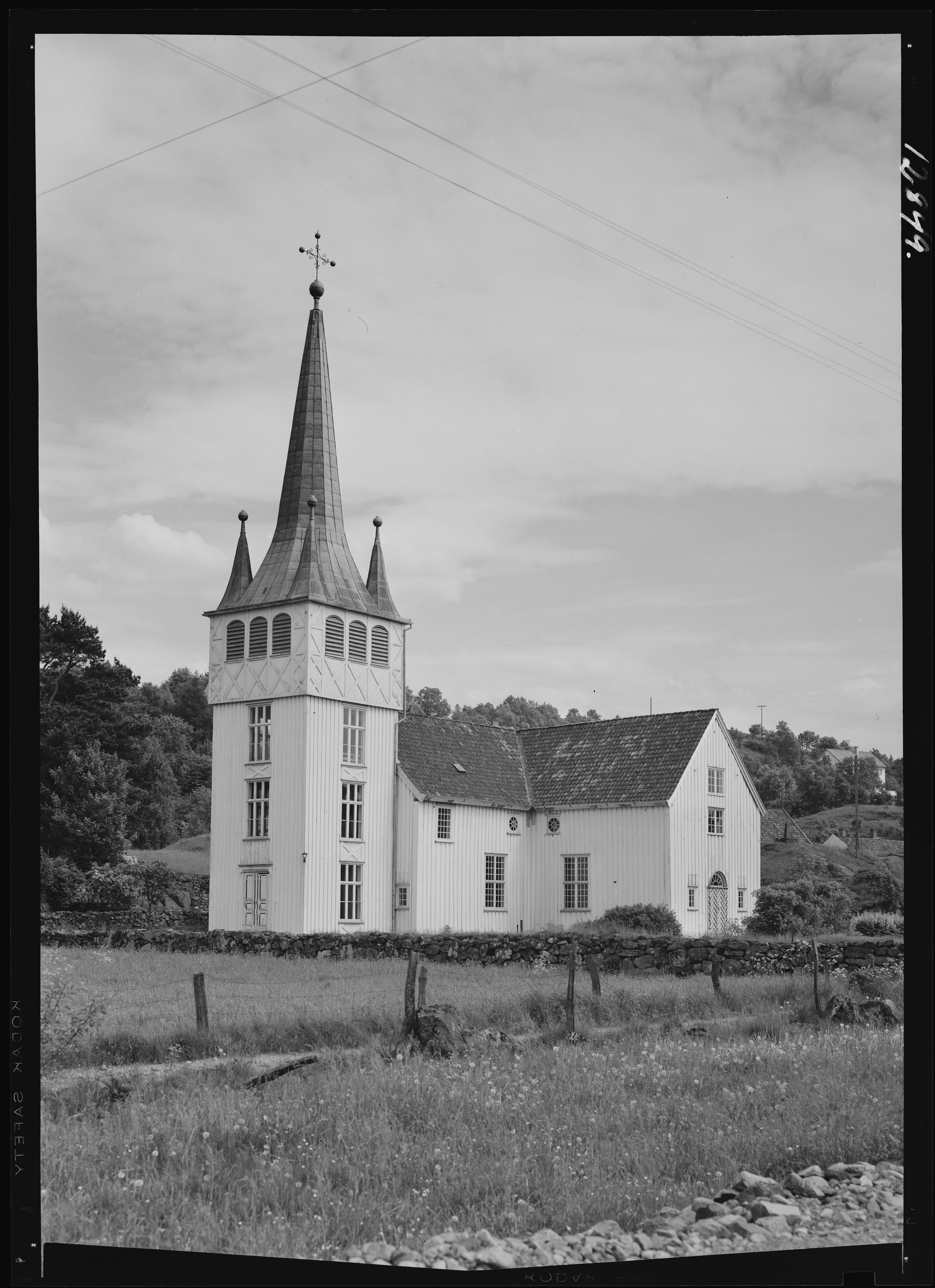

== See also ==
- List of churches in Rogaland
