= Hauge, Rogaland =

Village in Sokndal Municipality, Norway

Hauge Hauge i Dalane
- Village
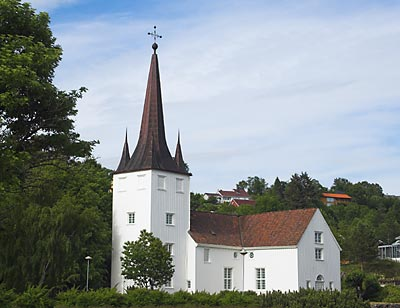
- View of the village
- Interactive map of Hauge
- Coordinates: 58.33995°N 6.28194°E
- Country: Norway
- Region: Western Norway
- County: Rogaland
- District: Dalane
- Municipality: Sokndal Municipality

Area
  - Total: 1.86 km^{2} (0.72 sq mi)
- Elevation: 6 m (20 ft)

Population (2025)
  - Total: 2,404
  - Density: 1,292/km^{2} (3,350/sq mi)
- Time zone: UTC+01:00 (CET)
  - Summer (DST): UTC+02:00 (CEST)
- Post Code: 4380 Hauge i Dalane

Hauge (locally pronounced Haua) is the administrative center of Sokndal Municipality in Rogaland county, Norway. It is located along the river Sokno, between the coastal villages of Rekefjord and Sogndalsstranda. Sokndal Church is located in the village.

The 1.86-square-kilometre (460-acre) village has a population (2025) of 2,404 and a population density of 1,292 inhabitants per square kilometre (3,350/sq mi).

== Name ==
The origin of the name Hauge is from the Old Norse word haugr meaning "mound" or "tumulus". It is often referred to as Hauge i Dalane since there are many villages named Hauge in Norway, and this one is located in the Dalane district, so this means Hauge in Dalane.

== Trivia ==
In an unceremonious SMS-vote competition dubbed "the dialectical games" ("dialektiske leker"), hosted by NRK-Rogaland between 20 June and 11 August in 2006, the dialect spoken in Hauge won a narrow victory over the Suldal-dialect as "the most beautiful dialect in Rogaland", receiving 2,816 of the total 5,577 votes in the final round.
