= Dalane =

- District
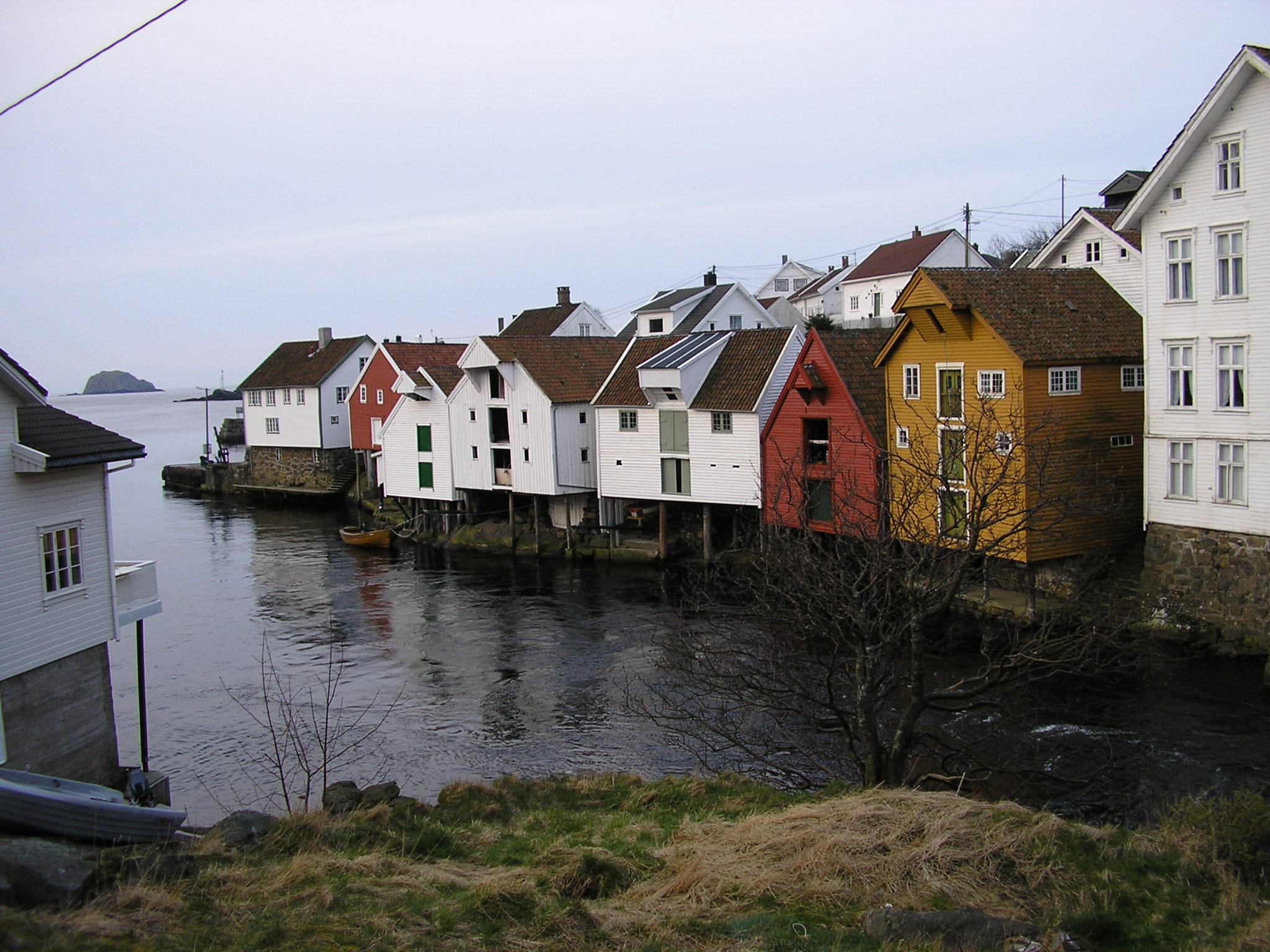

- Dalane
- Country: Norway
- County: Rogaland
- Region: Vestlandet
- Urban Center: Egersund

Area
  - Total: 1,786 km^{2} (690 sq mi)

Population (2024)
  - Total: 24,696
  - Density: 13.83/km^{2} (35.81/sq mi)
- Demonym: Dalbu

Dalane is a traditional district in the southwestern part of Norway, consisting of the municipalities of Lund, Sokndal, Eigersund, and Bjerkreim. Dalane is one of the 15 districts in Western Norway. It sits to the southeast of the very flat Jæren region and south of the moorland of Ryfylke. The 1,786-square-kilometre (690 sq mi) district has about 24,696 residents (as of 2024).

Dalane has a distinctive hilly, rugged, often treeless, bare, rocky land. There are numerous rivers and lakes, some of which are quite large. The rocky soil is very thin and is of poor quality compared to the fertile farmland in Jæren. The coastline is largely unprotected by any islands. The elevation of the land is low near the sea, while in the northern areas the mountains can reach heights of up to 900 metres (3,000 ft). The uplands of Dalane are often used for sheep grazing. Geographically, the southern part of Hå Municipality fits with the landscape of Dalane, but that municipality is usually grouped with Jæren.

The largest urban areas in Dalane are the town of Egersund and the villages of Moi in Lund Municipality, Hauge in Sokndal Municipality, and Vikeså in Bjerkreim Municipality. These four areas hold about 70% of the area's population (2013). There are also scattered settlements along the coast and in the large valleys inland.
