= Ole Gabriel Ueland =

Norwegian politician (1799–1870)

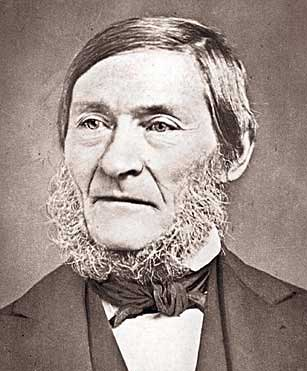

Member of the Norwegian Parliament
- In office 1833–1870

Personal details
- Born: 28 October 1799
- Died: 9 January 1870 (aged 70)

Ole Gabriel Ueland (28 October 1799 – 9 January 1870) was a Norwegian political leader and member of the Norwegian Parliament (1833–1869). Historians credit him with having popularized politics in rural Norway, paving the way for individuals of humble backgrounds to rise to positions of political importance.

Ueland was the son of Gabriel Osmundsen (1760–1843) and his wife Ingeborg Osmundsdatter Skaaland (1764–1816). Ueland was born on the Skåland farm in Lund parish in Rogaland, Norway. Ueland was raised in the traditional district of Dalane, a region characterized by small farms and an environment influenced by the Haugean Movement (haugianere).

Although his formal education had been limited to random local lessons, he had proven an unusual aptitude for learning and an appetite for reading. From 1817 until 1825, Ueland was a schoolteacher in Lund parish. He had by way of marriage acquired the Uelnd farm (Ueland i Heskestad). By 1827, he was installed as the sexton in the Heskestad Church in Lund parish. From 1827 to 1852, he was a teacher in Heskestad, before he became sheriff (1852–1856).

He was elected to the Norwegian Parliament in 1833, representing the rural constituency of Stavanger Amt. He remained a parliament member until 1869, having been re-elected thirteen times. He became the leader for the peasant and farmer's movement in politics and earned respect for his deliberate and wise political outlook.

Bjørnstjerne Bjørnson wrote of him:

Though he is a farmer behind his plough
and a sailor in his boat
he thought as well as anyone
in all the King's council
When he met in parliament
to promote the cause of farmers
every word gave birth to a ray
in the people's young day .
