= Heskestad Municipality =

Former municipality in Rogaland, Norway

Heskestad Municipality Heskestad herred
- Former municipality
- Rogaland within Norway

- Heskestad within Rogaland
- Coordinates: 58°29′52″N 06°21′33″E
- Country: Norway
- County: Rogaland
- District: Dalane
- Established: 1 Jan 1838
  - Created as: Formannskapsdistrikt
- Disestablished: 1 Jan 1965
  - Succeeded by: Lund Municipality and Eigersund Municipality
- Administrative centre: Heskestad

Government
  - Mayor (1949–1964): Jonas G. Dybing (LL)

Area (upon dissolution)
  - Total: 221.9 km^{2} (85.7 sq mi)
  - Rank: #324 in Norway
- Highest elevation: 903.93 m (2,965.6 ft)

Population (1964)
  - Total: 666
  - Rank: #510 in Norway
  - Density: 3/km^{2} (7.8/sq mi)
  - Change (10 years): ▼ −7.1%
- Demonym: Heskestadbu

Official language
  - Norwegian form: Neutral
- Time zone: UTC+01:00 (CET)
  - Summer (DST): UTC+02:00 (CEST)
- ISO 3166 code: NO-1113

Heskestad is a former municipality in Rogaland county, Norway. The 221.9-square-kilometre (85.7 sq mi) municipality existed from 1838 until its dissolution in 1965. The area is now divided between Eigersund Municipality and Lund Municipality in the traditional district of Dalane. The administrative centre was the village of Heskestad where the Heskestad Church is located.

Prior to its dissolution in 1965, the 221.9-square-kilometre (85.7 sq mi) municipality was the 324th largest by area out of the 525 municipalities in Norway. Heskestad Municipality was the 510th most populous municipality in Norway with a population of about 666. The municipality's population density was 3 inhabitants per square kilometre (7.8/sq mi) and its population had decreased by 7.1% over the previous 10-year period.

== General information ==
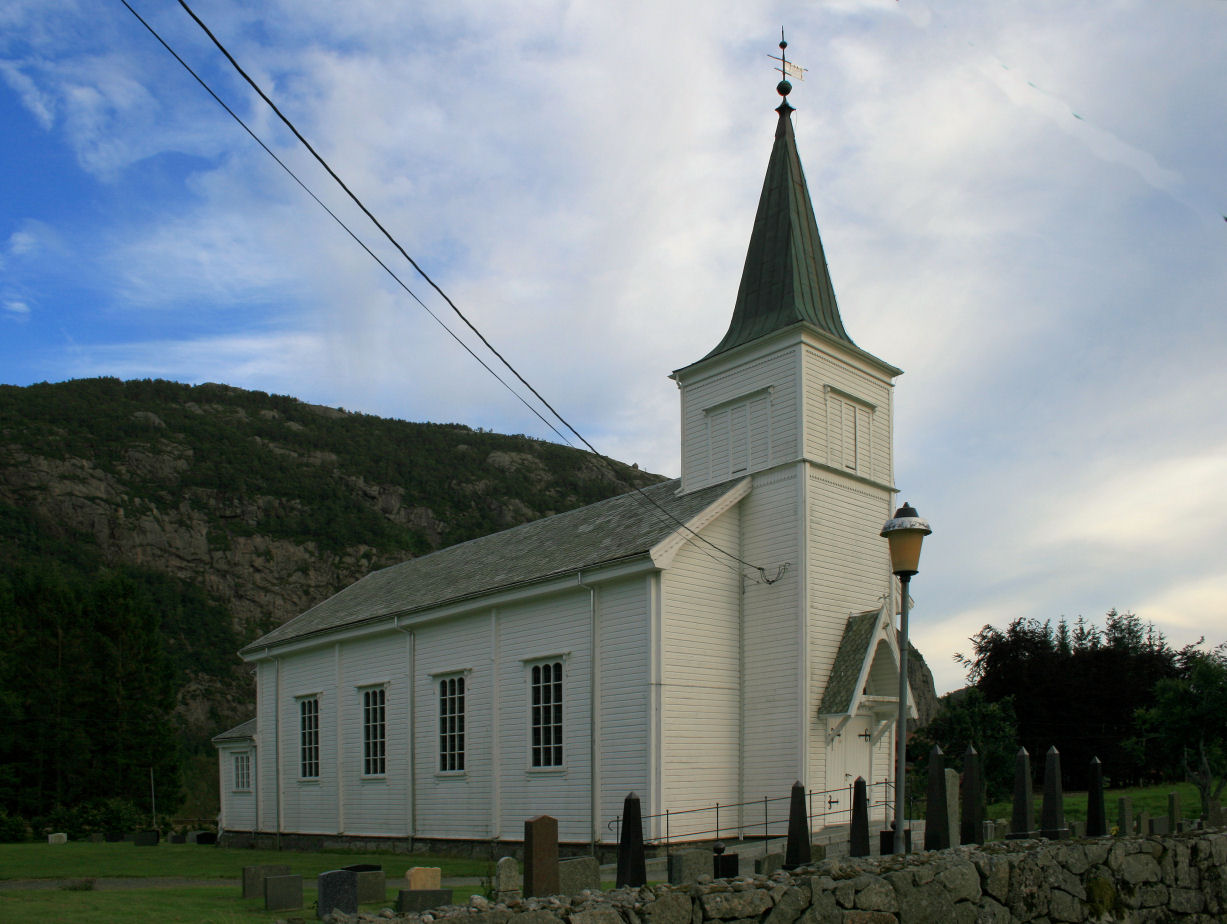
Heskestad Church

Heskestad was historically a part of the Helleland Church prestegjeld until 1820 when it became part of Lund Church prestegjeld. On 1 January 1838, the parish of Heskestad was established as a separate municipality (see formannskapsdistrikt law). During the 1960s, there were many municipal mergers across Norway due to the work of the Schei Committee. On 1 January 1965, Heskestad Municipality was dissolved and its lands were divided as follows:

- the majority of Heskestad Municipality, with 547 inhabitants, was merged into the neighboring Lund Municipality
- the Gyadalen and Grøsfjell areas, with 114 inhabitants, were merged with the town of Egersund (population: 3,787), Eigersund Municipality (population: 4,664), and Helleland Municipality (population: 851) to form a much larger Eigersund Municipality

=== Name ===
The municipality (originally the parish) is named after the old Heskestad farm (Old Norse: Heskjastaðir) since the first Heskestad Church was built there. The first element possibly comes from Høski, a nickname for the historic male name Hǫskollr or Hǫskuldr. The last element is the plural form of staðr which means "place" or "abode".

=== Churches ===
The Church of Norway had one parish (sokn) within Heskestad Municipality. At the time of the municipal dissolution, it was part of the Lund prestegjeld and the Dalane prosti (deanery) in the Diocese of Stavanger.

Churches in Heskestad Municipality
Parish (sokn)	Church name	Location of the church	Year built
Heskestad	Heskestad Church	Heskestad	1904

== Geography ==
Heskestad Municipality is located in the inland part of the Dalane region. The highest point in the municipality was the 903.93-metre (2,965.6 ft) tall mountain Store Skykula, on the border with Bjerkreim Municipality. Bjerkreim Municipality was located to the north, Tonstad Municipality was located to the northeast, Lund Municipality was located to the east, Sokndal Municipality was located to the south, Eigersund Municipality was located to the southwest, and Helleland Municipality was located to the west.

== Government ==
While it existed, Heskestad Municipality was responsible for primary education (through 10th grade), outpatient health services, senior citizen services, welfare and other social services, zoning, economic development, and municipal roads and utilities. The municipality was governed by a municipal council of directly elected representatives. The mayor was indirectly elected by a vote of the municipal council. The municipality was under the jurisdiction of the Dalane District Court and the Gulating Court of Appeal.

=== Municipal council ===
The municipal council (Herredsstyre) of Heskestad Municipality was made up of 13 representatives that were elected to four year terms. The tables below show the historical composition of the council by political party.

Heskestad herredsstyre 1963–1965
Party name (in Norwegian)	Number of representatives
Labour Party (Arbeiderpartiet)	2
Joint List(s) of Non-Socialist Parties (Borgerlige Felleslister)	7
Local List(s) (Lokale lister)	4
Total number of members:	13
Note: On 1 January 1965, Heskestad Municipality was divided between Eigersund Municipality and Lund Municipality.

Heskestad herredsstyre 1959–1963
Party name (in Norwegian)	Number of representatives
Labour Party (Arbeiderpartiet)	2
Joint List(s) of Non-Socialist Parties (Borgerlige Felleslister)	8
Local List(s) (Lokale lister)	3
Total number of members:	13

Heskestad herredsstyre 1955–1959
Party name (in Norwegian)	Number of representatives
List of workers, fishermen, and small farmholders (Arbeidere, fiskere, småbrukere liste)	3
Joint List(s) of Non-Socialist Parties (Borgerlige Felleslister)	10
Total number of members:	13

Heskestad herredsstyre 1951–1955
Party name (in Norwegian)	Number of representatives
List of workers, fishermen, and small farmholders (Arbeidere, fiskere, småbrukere liste)	4
Joint List(s) of Non-Socialist Parties (Borgerlige Felleslister)	5
Local List(s) (Lokale lister)	3
Total number of members:	12

Heskestad herredsstyre 1947–1951
Party name (in Norwegian)	Number of representatives
Labour Party (Arbeiderpartiet)	3
Farmers' Party (Bondepartiet)	2
Liberal Party (Venstre)	2
Local List(s) (Lokale lister)	5
Total number of members:	12

Heskestad herredsstyre 1945–1947
Party name (in Norwegian)	Number of representatives
Labour Party (Arbeiderpartiet)	3
Farmers' Party (Bondepartiet)	5
Local List(s) (Lokale lister)	4
Total number of members:	12

Heskestad herredsstyre 1937–1941*
Party name (in Norwegian)	Number of representatives
Labour Party (Arbeiderpartiet)	1
Farmers' Party (Bondepartiet)	3
Joint List(s) of Non-Socialist Parties (Borgerlige Felleslister)	8
Total number of members:	12
Note: Due to the German occupation of Norway during World War II, no elections were held for new municipal councils until after the war ended in 1945.

=== Mayors ===
The mayor (Nynorsk: ordførar) of Heskestad Municipality was the political leader of the municipality and the chairperson of the municipal council. The following people have held this position:

- 1838–1851: Ole Gabriel Ueland
- 1852–1855: Helge Eriksen Ollestad
- 1866–1869: Ole Gabriel Ueland
- 1870–1873: Iver Pedersen Sandsmark
- 1874–1879: Gabriel Ueland
- 1880–1883: Iver Pedersen Sandsmark
- 1884–1885: Ole Martin Ueland
- 1886–1891: Ole L. Bjuland
- 1892–1893: Ole Martin Ueland
- 1894–1897: Ole L. Bjuland
- 1898–1898: Peder I. Sandsmark
- 1899–1901: Svend O. Ollestad
- 1902–1907: Ole Gabriel J. Ueland
- 1908–1908: Ole L. Bjuland
- 1909–1910: Ole Gabriel J. Ueland
- 1911–1913: Ole L. Bjuland
- 1914–1916: Ole Gabriel J. Ueland
- 1917–1941: Botolv Flom
- 1942–1945: Alf Bilstad
- 1945–1945: Botolv Flom
- 1946–1947: O.G.F. Ueland
- 1947–1949: Helge Ollestad
- 1949–1964: Jonas G. Dybing (LL)

== See also ==
- List of former municipalities of Norway
