= Grøsfjellvatnet =

Lake in Rogaland, Norway

- Interactive map of Grøsfjellvatnet
- Location: Dalane, Rogaland
- Coordinates: 58.48166°N 6.28198°E
- Basin countries: Norway
- Max. length: 3.8 kilometres (2.4 mi)
- Max. width: 1.4 kilometres (0.87 mi)
- Surface area: 3.09 km^{2} (1.19 sq mi)
- Shore length^{1}: 21.27 kilometres (13.22 mi)
- Surface elevation: 176 metres (577 ft)
- References: NVE
- ^{1} Shore length is not a well-defined measure.

Grøsfjellvatnet is a lake in Rogaland county, Norway. It is located along the borders of Eigersund Municipality, Lund Municipality, and Sokndal Municipality. The 3.09-square-kilometre (1.19 sq mi) lake list just north of the lake Eiavatnet, about 4 kilometres (2.5 mi) west of the village of Heskestad in Lund Municipality.

== See also ==
- List of lakes in Norway
