= Hovsvatnet =

Lake in Rogaland, Norway

- Interactive map of Hovsvatnet
- Location: Lund Municipality, Rogaland
- Coordinates: 58.49298°N 6.50175°E
- Primary inflows: Storåna river
- Primary outflows: Moisåna river
- Basin countries: Norway
- Max. length: 3.7 kilometres (2.3 mi)
- Max. width: 4.4 kilometres (2.7 mi)
- Surface area: 3.92 km^{2} (1.51 sq mi)
- Shore length^{1}: 15.86 kilometres (9.85 mi)
- Surface elevation: 62 metres (203 ft)
- References: NVE
- ^{1} Shore length is not a well-defined measure.

Hovsvatnet is a lake in Lund Municipality in Rogaland county, Norway. The lake lies between the villages of Eik (in the north) and Moi in the south. The European route E39 highway runs along the whole southern shore of the V-shaped lake. Most of the sides of the lake have high mountains on the shoreline, preventing habitation along most of the lake.

== See also ==
- List of lakes in Norway
