= Mikal Andreassen Stenberg =

Norwegian merchant and politician

Mikal Andreassen Stenberg (8 August 1849 – 19 February 1941) was a Norwegian merchant and politician for the Conservative Party.

He was born in Lund Municipality as a son of farmers. He became a tailor from 1864 and a merchant from 1895, settling in Stavanger. Here he was elected city council member from 1885 to 1906, serving as deputy mayor from 1901 to 1903. He was elected as a deputy representative to the Parliament of Norway for the terms 1895–1897 and 1904–1906, meeting in parliamentary session in 1906.
