= Moi Station =

Railway station in Lund, Norway

Moi
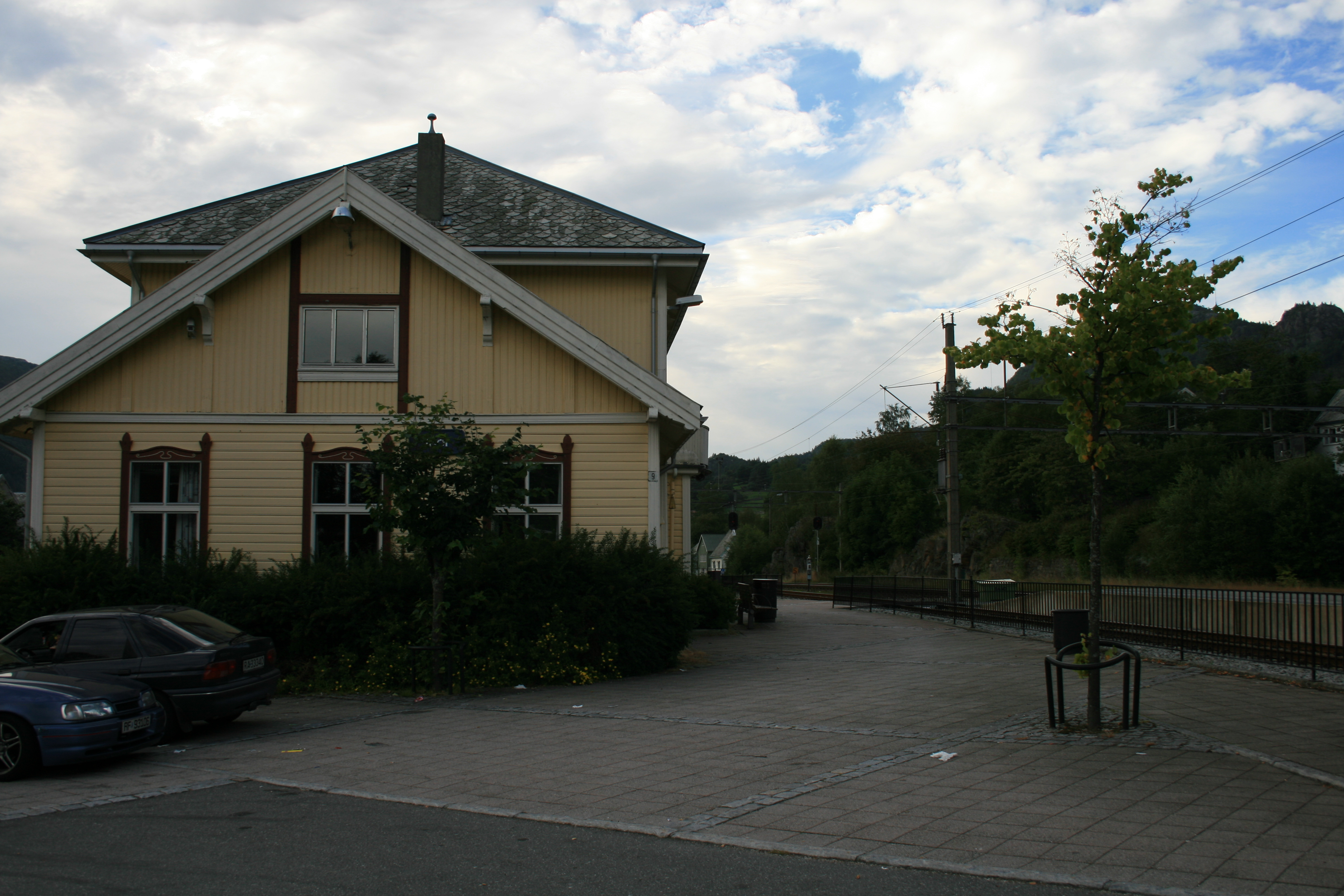

General information
- Location: Moi, Lund Municipality; Norway
- Coordinates: 58°27′29″N 6°33′02″E
- Elevation: 58.4 m (192 ft) AMSL
- Owner: Bane NOR
- Operator: Go-Ahead Norge
- Line: Sørlandet Line
- Distance: 477.24 km (296.54 mi)
- Platforms: 2

Other information
- Station code: MOI

History
- Opened: 1943
Location

Moi Station (Norwegian: Moi stasjon) is a railway station located at the village of Moi in Lund Municipality in Rogaland county, Norway. The station is located along the Sørlandet Line. The station is served by regional trains operated by Go-Ahead Norge to the cities of Stavanger and Kristiansand.

== History ==
The station was opened in 1904, when the Jæren Line was extended from Egersund to Flekkefjord. In 1943, the current station was built when it became part of the Sørlandet Line.

Preceding station	Express trains	Following station
Egersund towards Stavanger	F5	Sira towards Oslo S
