= Eik, Rogaland =

Village in Lund Municipality, Norway

Eik Hovsherad
- Village
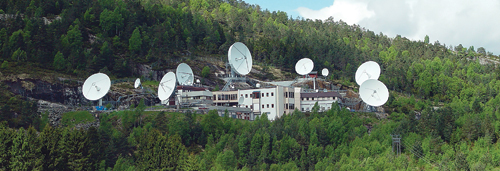
- View of the satellite station in Eik
- Interactive map of Eik
- Coordinates: 58.52599°N 6.49886°E
- Country: Norway
- Region: Western Norway
- County: Rogaland
- District: Dalane
- Municipality: Lund Municipality
- Elevation: 86 m (282 ft)
- Time zone: UTC+01:00 (CET)
  - Summer (DST): UTC+02:00 (CEST)
- Post Code: 4462 Hovsherad

Eik is a village in Lund Municipality in Rogaland county, Norway. The village is located about 9 kilometres (5.6 mi) north of the municipal centre of Moi. The small village lies in an area called Hovsherad on the north shore of the lake Hovsvatnet. The river Storåni runs through Eik.

Since 1981 it has had a station for worldwide Inmarsat access. It is part of a communication system that is used by Denmark, and other countries. The Eik treskofabrikk company is a clog factory also located in Eik.
