= Børge Rannestad =

Norwegian footballer (born 1973)

Personal information
- Full name: Børge André Rannestad
- Date of birth: 16 August 1973 (age 53)
- Position: Midfielder

Youth career
- –1990: Moi

Senior career*
Years	Team	Apps	(Gls)
1990–1991	Bryne		
1992	Kvinesdal		
1992–1995	Viking	14	(3)
1996–1999	Odd		
2000	Mandalskameratene		
c. 2002	Kvinesdal		

International career
1989	Norway u-16	14	(2)
1990	Norway u-17	3	(0)
1991	Norway u-18	7	(0)
1992	Norway u-19	6	(1)
1993	Norway u-20	4	(0)
- * Club domestic league appearances and goals

Børge André Rannestad (born 16 August 1973) is a retired Norwegian football midfielder.

Hailing from Moi, he came up in the club Moi IL. He represented Norway numerous times from the u-16 through u-20 levels, including as a squad member at the 1993 FIFA World Youth Championship.

He had a stint in Bryne before joining Kvinesdal in 1992, only to move on to the region's top-tier team and reigning league champions Viking FK in the summer of 1992. Recording a maximum of 8 league games during one season, namely in 1993, he went on to Odds BK in 1996.

The team secured promotion to the 1999 Tippeligaen, but the 1999 season was marred by long-term injury for Rannestad. He played for Mandalskameratene in 2000, before retiring, later featuring occasionally for Kvinesdal IL, now on the seventh tier.
