= Teksevatnet =

Lake in Rogaland, Norway

- Interactive map of Teksevatnet
- Location: Dalane, Rogaland
- Coordinates: 58.54951°N 6.2752°E
- Basin countries: Norway
- Max. length: 1.5 kilometres (0.93 mi)
- Max. width: 3.25 kilometres (2.02 mi)
- Surface area: 2.26 km^{2} (0.87 sq mi)
- Shore length^{1}: 17.34 kilometres (10.77 mi)
- Surface elevation: 182 metres (597 ft)
- References: NVE
- ^{1} Shore length is not a well-defined measure.

Teksevatnet is a lake located on the border of Eigersund Municipality and Lund Municipality in Rogaland county, Norway. The 2.26 km^{2} (0.87 sq mi) lake lies just north of the European route E39 highway about 20 kilometres (12 mi) northeast of the town of Egersund.

== See also ==
- List of lakes in Norway
