= Pete Sanstol =

Norwegian boxer (1905–1982)

Personal information
- Nicknames: The Baby Cyclone; The Blond Tiger
- Nationality: (Norway) Norwegian by birth 1943 US citizen World War II US Army Service
- Born: Peder Olai Sanstøl (Norwegian); March 28, 1905 Moi, Norway
- Died: March 13, 1982 (aged 76) Whittier, California
- Height: 5 ft 3 in (1.60 m)
- Weight: Flyweight; Bantamweight

Boxing career
- Reach: 67 in (170 cm)
- Stance: Orthodox

Boxing record
- Total fights: 113; Newspaper wins and losses Included
- Wins: 99
- Win by KO: 27
- Losses: 6
- Draws: 8

Pete Sanstol (March 28, 1905 – March 13, 1982) was a Norwegian-American professional boxer who took the Canadian version of the World Bantamweight Championship (sanctioned by the Montreal Athletic Commission) at a bout in Montreal in 1931 against Archie Bell. Sanstol contended twice unsuccessfully for the NBA World Bantamweight Title, and was a class of 2000 World Boxing Hall of Fame inductee.

Lew Burston, Raoul Godbout, George Blake, and Bobby Diamond were his managers. His trainers were Jake Kravitz and Manny Seeman.

== Early life and amateur career ==
Peder Olai Sanstøl was the youngest of five children born to Jonas Jonasen Sanstøl (1864–1942) and Elen Dortea Nilsdatter Lindland (1860–1946) in Moi, Lunde Municipality, in Rogaland county in Norway. He moved to Stavanger with his parents as a child. Sanstol learned to box in the club Kristiana AK, after his family moved to Oslo. Boxing as an amateur, he came in fourth in the flyweight class championship in 1923 and won gold in the bantam class championship in 1925.

== Professional boxing career ==
Pete Sanstol embarked on a professional career in 1926. After winning his professional debut against the British boxing veteran Bert Gallard in Oslo, Sanstol was invited by Max Schmeling's manager to train in Berlin. After Sanstol left Norway in the mid-1920s, he only occasionally returned.

On July 13, 1926 Sanstol defeated Harry Stein, then the Flyweight Champion of Germany, in Berlin at Luna Park in a four-round newspaper decision. The source, BOX-SPORT reported that Sanstol won the decision decisively.

=== Bout with Andre Dedieu in Paris ===
Winning all his bouts in Germany, Sanstol moved on to Paris where he fought at least through February 1927. On January 24, 1927, he met the well known Andre Dedieu at the Central Sporting Club in Paris, winning in a third-round technical knockout. Some observers in Paris compared him to French boxing champion, Georges Carpentier. Discovered in Paris by American manager Lew Burston (1896–1969), Sanstol was brought to New York around mid-1927, where he graduated from the club preliminaries to become the most sought after bantam in the eastern United States and Canada.

=== Bouts with Joey Scalfano ===
On October 22, 1930, Sanstol fought a tough ten-round draw against Joey Scalfano at Madison Square Garden that was "nip and tuck for the entire ten rounds", and a great crowd pleaser. Sanstol later described it as one of his toughest fights. There were no knockdowns in the bout and the fighting was fast-paced and frenzied. Scalfaro's left eye was completed closed for the last two rounds and his blows often missed their mark. Sanstol had previously lost to Scalfaro on August 6, 1930 at Madison Square Garden in a ten-round points decision. Scalfaro was known as the only boxer to score a knock down of the Black Cuban champion Kid Chocolate in North America.

=== Taking the Canadian version of the World Bantamweight Championship ===
By late 1930, Sanstol had moved his headquarters from the Norwegian-American community of Bay Ridge, in Brooklyn, NY, to Montreal, Canada where he came under the management of Raoul Godbout (1894–1975).

On May 20, 1931, in his most important bout, Sanstol won the World Bantamweight Title in a ten-round unanimous decision against the great New York Jewish contender Archie Bell in Montreal. The title was recognized by the Montreal Athletic Commission and the Canadian Boxing Federation, so it had some limits in its scope. The fast bout had no knockdowns. For a championship bout, it received very limited coverage in American newspapers. Sanstol weighted 115 1/2, giving up only two pounds to Bell. Bell would later contend for but not take the British version of the World Bantamweight Title and contend twice for the California version of the World Featherweight Title.

=== First defense of the Canadian World Bantamweight Title ===
Sanstol twice successfully defended his bantamweight title. On June 17, 1931, Sanstol defeated Art Giroux, also of Montreal, in the Canadian version of a World Bantamweight Title. Leading in the betting odds by 7 to 5, Sanstol won the fifteen round bout at the Forum in Montreal in a fifteen-round Unanimous Decision. Giroux was the Canadian Bantamweight Champion at the time. After the win, Sanstol was rated second in the world in the bantamweight division, behind only Panama Al Brown, according to the quarterly standings of the National Boxing Association (NBA).

=== Second defense of the Canadian World Bantamweight Title ===
On July 29, 1931, again at the Forum in Montreal, Sanstol defeated Eugène Huat in a ten-round Unanimous Decision in his second defense of the Canadian version of the World Bantamweight Title. Huat was the French Bantamweight Champion at the time. In a fairly close bout, Huat knocked Sanstol off his feet in the eighth round. In the eighth round, Huat scored often with lightning fast jabs that went through Sanstol's defense, though Huat appeared to have lost the first few rounds, with Sanstol not clearly taking the lead til the seventh. In the ninth the boxing seemed close, but in the tenth, perhaps with greater stamina, Sanstol took the offensive and battered Huat with telling blows. Sanstol's performance in the final round may have strongly influenced the judge's decisions. The final decision for Sanstol was not entirely popular with the crowd.

=== Attempt at the NBA World Bantamweight Championship, Al Brown ===
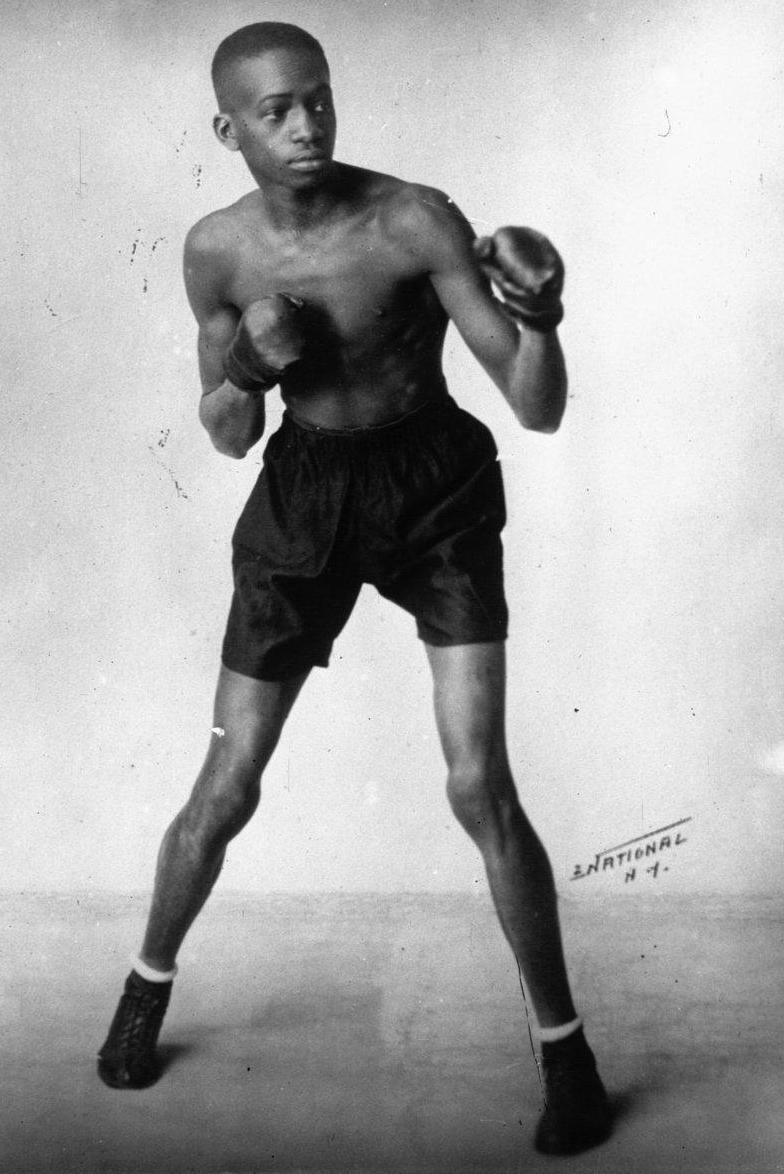
Panama Al Brown

On August 25, 1931, Sanstol met Panama Al Brown for the widely recognized NBA and NYSAC World Bantamweight Title before a crowd of 23,000 at the Forum in Montreal. The bout was considered the largest gross take on a bout in the history of boxing in Montreal according to the New York Times, and was easily one of the largest audiences for any of Sanstol's fights. Sanstol lost the bout in a close fifteen round split decision. In the close bout, the Canadian Press gave Brown seven rounds, Stanstol five, with three rounds even.

Sanstol fought much of the bout in a crouch, to compensate for a six-inch disadvantage in height and reach. Aiming down on Sanstol, Brown scored frequently with blows to the head, opening a cut over one of Sanstol's eyes, which eventually reduced his vision. Sanstol fought on doggedly despite his. Fighting during the depression, Sanstol took about $3,427 for his loss, not a great amount for a world championship bout, considering Jack Dempsey had received over $150,000 for some of his World Heavyweight Championship wins.

=== Draw with NBA Flyweight Champion Spider Pladner ===
On July 20, 1932 Sanstol fought a ten-round draw with 1929 NBA World Flyweight Champion Emille "Spider" Pladner, a French born boxer, at the Forum in Montreal, Canada. An important bout between contenders, the January 1932 ratings, listed Sanstol as the third best bantamweight in the world, with Pladner listed as fourth. Pladner had also held the 1931 Canadian World Bantamweight Title.

=== Short retirement and bout with Midget Wolgast ===
After losing the bout with Brown, Sanstol took a year off between August 1931 and June 1932, before resuming another campaign for the championship. On August 15, 1933, Sanstol fought an important bout against Midget Wolgast, NYSAC World Flyweight Champion at the time, losing in a ten-round non-title points decision in a bout where the brows of his face and his eyes were battered. According to one source, Wolgast won every round.

=== Victory over Young Perez ===
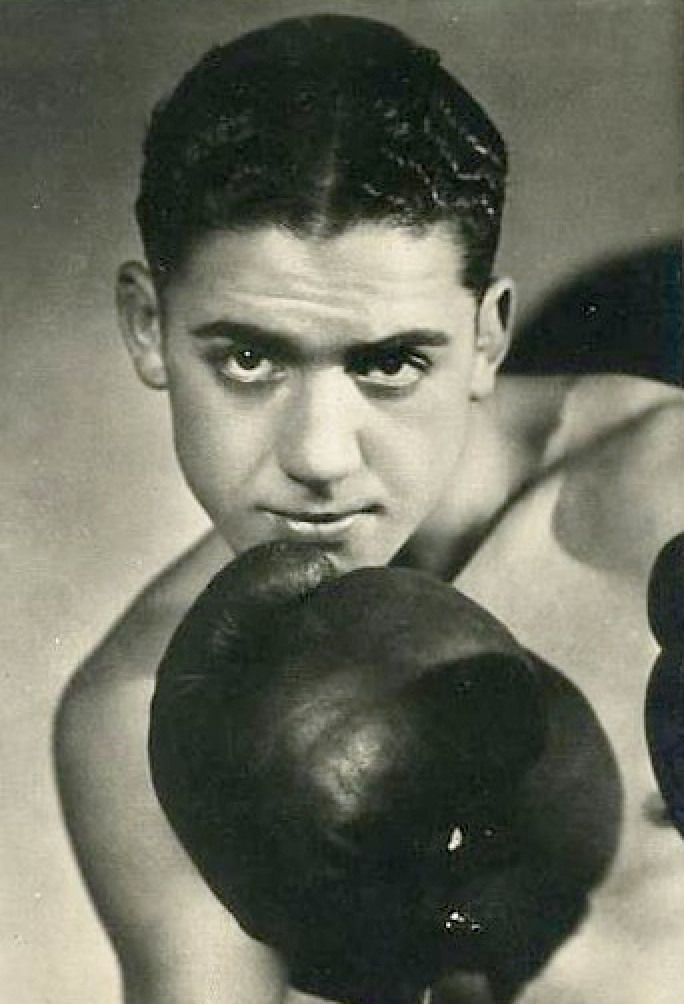
Flyweight Champion Young Perez

On September 1, 1934, Sanstol defeated World Champion Victor "Young" Perez at Bislet Stadium in Oslo in a ten-round points decision. In October 1931, Perez had taken the NBA World Flyweight Championship in a second-round knockout at the Palais de Sports in Paris, France, making him one of the youngest world boxing champions in history. In 1929, Perez had also taken the French Flyweight Title. A Tunisian Jew, Perez would die tragically in 1945 on a march from Auschwitz, where he had been interned, after being denounced to the Nazis in Paris in 1943.

=== Wins in Sweden and Germany ===
He retired from boxing in late 1933, fighting only one bout in 1934, and then resumed his boxing in Sweden in 1935. He won a ten-round points decision in Berlin against Hans Schiller, former German Featherweight Champion, on May 10, 1935. In Sweden he met Werner Reithdorf on April 26, 1935, winning in an eighth-round TKO in Gothenburg, and Joey Carr on March 1, 1935, also in Gothenburg, where he won in a first-round knockout.

== Last NBA World Bantamweight Title bout, Sixto Escobar ==
With both boxers very near 118, Sanstol had his last NBA World Bantamweight Championship match with Sixto Escobar, on August 7, 1935 at the Forum in Montreal. Sanstol lost the bout in a twelve-round unanimous decision, that was not particularly close, though quite satisfying to the crowd. In the seventh, Escobar closed Sanstol's left eye, in effect winning the bout, or reducing his need to show the same level of aggression. Ringside observers gave Escobar eight rounds, with four rounds even.

== Win over Panama Al Brown ==
Sanstol had one more career bout of consequence, on September 13, 1935, defeating Al Brown in Oslo in a ten-round non-title decision a month after the Escobar fight, not long before his retirement.

== United States ==
Sanstol joined the US Army Air Corp on April 3, 1942. He served a total of three years and two months. During his service, he fought two army benefit fights on May 1, and July 16, 1942 in Miami, Florida, winning both in a four-round and then ten-round decision. While in the Air Corp, he also refereed a bout on May 8, 1943 in Montreal.

He completed his service on June 12, 1945. He became a U.S. citizen, a privilege he had long awaited, in 1943 during his service with the Army.

== Fighting style ==
Sanstol was known for his aggression, energy, speed, amazing stamina and uncanny defense. He was also known for his ability to give the crowd a thrilling show. About the only attribute he lacked was the so-called "power punch", although a quarter of his 98 victories were by way of knockout. Throughout his early career, Sanstol used these skills to build an impressive record. In time, his fighting style gradually evolved from that of a careless youth, to that of a wizened veteran. After his first bout with Panama Al Brown, Sanstol learned to pace himself better and to use every punch sparingly, not wasting a single drop of energy. Part of this evolution may have resulted from a chronically bad foot or ankle he first sustained during one of these title bouts. It would haunt and hobble him for the remainder of his professional career.

Long-time Montreal Herald Sports Editor Elmer W. Ferguson (1885–1972) once described Sanstol's evolved fighting style as follows:

Sanstol first flashed on the Montreal fistic horizon half a dozen years ago. This writer recollects him knocking out Aleck Burlie in April 1928, over seven years ago at the Forum. In those days Sanstol was a bewildering bundle of speed and energy. His slim, tireless legs carried him around the ring at bounding, blinding speed. He threw his endless energy to the winds with complete abandon. He was a profligate spendthrift of energy and strength, of nerve force. He had all the carelessness of youth about vitality as expended in the ring. He had a seemingly endless supply. For ten or twelve rounds he could dance, bounce, leap and dash about the ring on those steel legs, and meanwhile his speeding fists could keep on throwing stinging punches at bewildering speed, punches from all angles. For not only did Sanstol bound about the ring. He ducked like lightning, weaved, bobbed, always going at top speed, a master-boxer in his own fashion, a fashion founded on speed and stamina. The fighting heart that blazes from his ice-cold eyes still sends him on. But fistic age has tempered the pace, has developed a new ring cunning, and a tendency to accomplish by polished skill what he once achieved by youthful energy that disdained to save itself, that was gladly thrown to the winds. Sanstol doesn't bound so much as he did. He moves now in a more shuffling fashion, as did great fighters before him, and as did such peerless runners as Schrubb and Nurmi, the greatest of all conservation stylists. Today Sanstol is inclined to save his legs, to some degree, and to employ instead the ring-craft he has acquired in nearly ten years of campaigning up and down the fistic lanes of two continents. Today he is more the Dempsey in his style, less the old Sanstol. His hands still carry their speed, his arms and shoulders the energy to hurl an endless barrage of punches. But he will be found doing much more of the weaving and bending to evade blows or get himself into hitting position. He will not be leaping five or six feet when an evasive swing of a few inches will suffice. He will be doing more of the bobbing and ducking and swinging from the hips, with which he used to delight crowds and bewilder his opponents.

== Career highlights and honors ==
- Amateur Flyweight class championship of Norway in 1923
- Amateur recipient of Gold in the Norwegian and Scandinavian Bantam class championship in 1925
- Canadian World Bantamweight Champion (1931)
- Ranked by long-time Madison Square Garden Matchmaker Tom McArdle with legendary bantams Terry McGovern, Kid Williams, and Pete Herman (1931 Everlast Boxing Record)
- Featured solo on the cover of the August 1931 The Ring magazine and in its accompanying article
- Described in the article "The Golden Bantams" (The Ring, December 1953 issue, page 13) as "one of the hottest local favorites the big town New York ever had. Pete, flashy, colorful and capable fought in the Ridgewood Grove Sporting Club in the Queens section of New York no less than 26 times in one year, packing the place every time."
- Proclaimed the Ridgewood Grove's "Greatest Ring Attraction" by The Ring magazine's Ted Carroll
- Ranked with Leo "Kid" Roy as Montreal's favorite boxer of the late 1920s/early 1930s
- Inducted into the World Boxing Hall of Fame in 2000

Achievements
| Preceded by Inaugural | Montreal Athletic Commission & Canadian Athletic Federation World Bantamweight Champion; May 20, 1931 – August 25, 1931 | Succeeded by Panama Al Brown |

== Life after boxing ==
After his boxing career ended, Sanstol worked various jobs in Norway, New York City, Chicago, Seattle, and Alaska, including restaurant owner, newspaper writer, recreation center director, hotel clerk, and translator. In 1957, he completed his autobiography entitled Gjennom Ringen.

He married Bessie Andrews Marshal in Seattle on August 24, 1956. Shortly after the wedding, Sanstol and his wife moved to live in Norway, where he was still remembered for his boxing. He was in demand, often telling stories of his boxing days, and speaking to groups. In 1960, Pete moved back to the West Coast of the United States with his wife, taking a job in Long Beach, California, as a translator for a shipping company. In 1962, Sanstol and his wife moved to nearby San Pedro. By October 15, 1981, Sanstol was living in a Convalescent Home in Torrance, California suffering from a diagnosed form of dementia.

He died in 1982 in Whittier, California after a series of strokes. On June 7, 2005, Lund municipality raised a monolith in a park in Moi to his memory, listing him as Norway's most famous boxer.
