= Magma Geopark =

Geopark in Norway

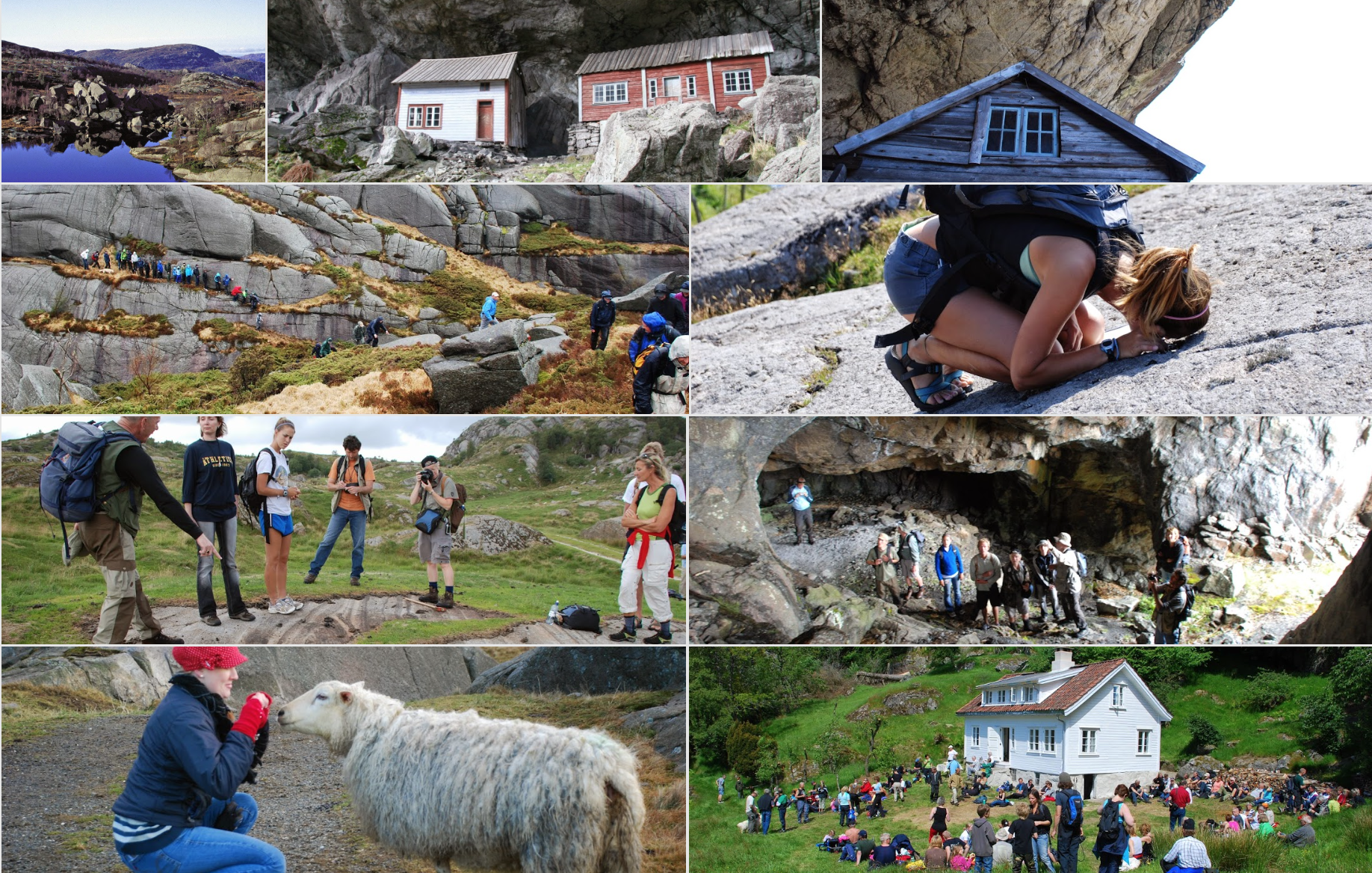
- Different geological locations in Magma UNESCO Global Geopark
- Interactive map of Magma Geopark
- Type: UNESCO Global Geopark
- Location: Rogaland/Agder counties, Norway
- Coordinates: 58°26′52″N 6°0′22″E
- Area: 3,000 km^{2} (1,158.31 mi^{2})
- Created: 2010

Magma Geopark is the second Geopark to be designated in Norway, having gained membership of both the European Geoparks Network and Global Network of National Geoparks in 2010.

Magma Geopark has several nature, cultural, historical and industrial attractions for both local visitors or tourists. The area has wide network routes and locations for outdoor activities, such as hiking, biking, climbing and kayaking.

== Geography ==
The Magma Geopark covers several municipalities of southwest Norway, namely Eigersund, Bjerkreim, Flekkefjord, Lund, and Sokndal. It is designated to have an area of 3,000 square kilometres (1,200 mi^{2}), including several islands.

The geopark's headquarters are located in the town of Egersund. The Jæren Line (a subsection of the Sørlandet Line) runs between Stavanger and Egersund every hour.

== Geology ==
Magma Geopark has an area of 2,329 square kilometres (899 mi^{2}) based on the largest layered intrusion and anorthosite area found in Europe and it .

About 1,500 million years ago, the region had a landscape of red-hot magma and a mountain range called the Sveconorwegian.

The main rock type of the geopark anorthosite, which is more common on the Moon than on the surface of the Earth. Because of this, advertising for the geopark commonly depicts an explorer in a space suit. The anorthosite was formed approximately 930 million years ago at a depth of 20 kilometres (12 mi) below the Earth's surface.

Through millions of years, glaciers helped to form the landscape seen today.

== Culture and History ==
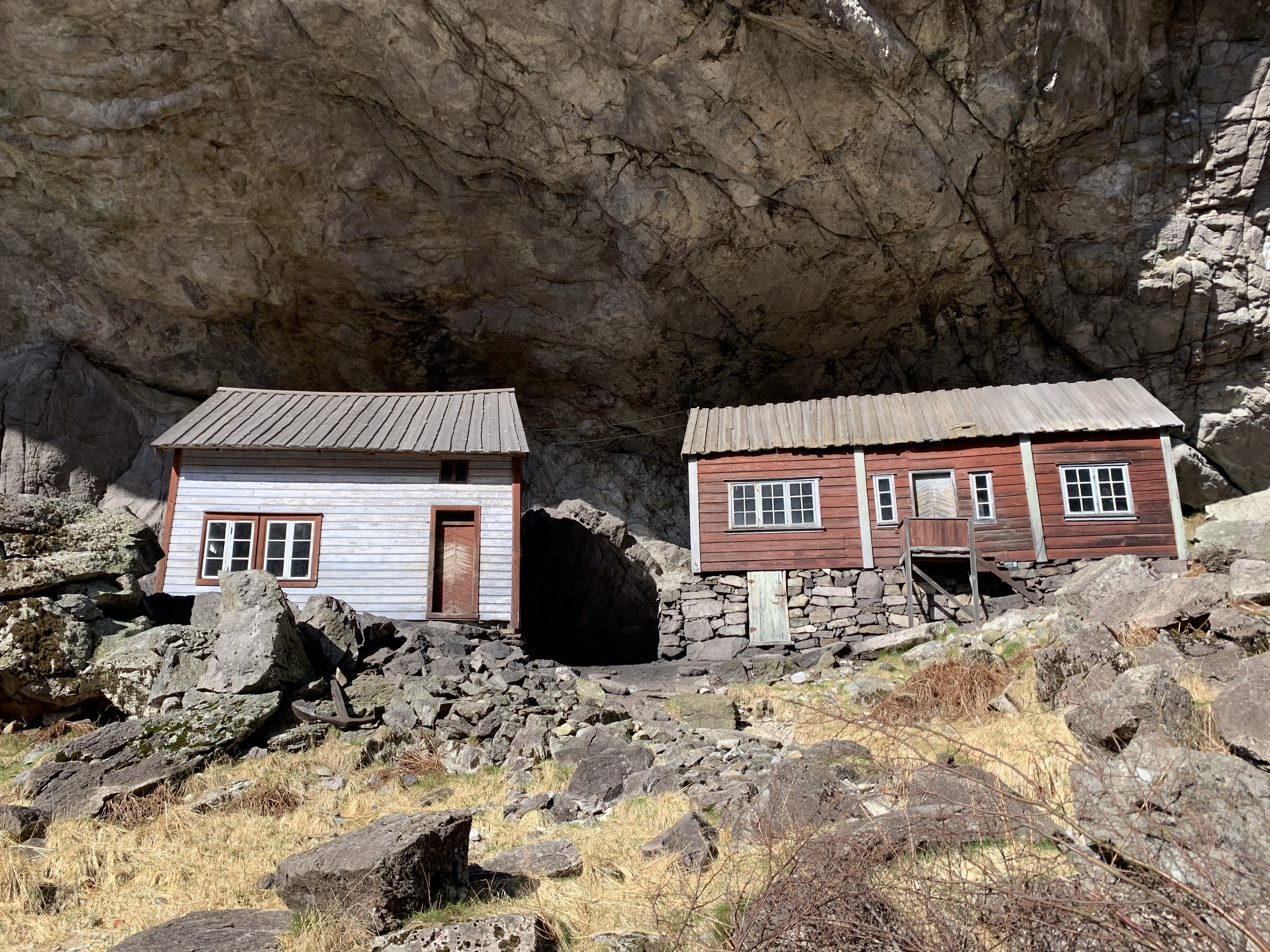
Helleren farmhouses within the Jøssingfjord

Norway's first cast-iron lighthouse, the Eigerøy Lighthouse, is situated within the geopark on Midbrødøya, just west of Eigerøya.

The geopart includes two houses of the Helleren farm, located along the Jøssingfjorden.

As with many geoparks, there are a number of mines within the park's designated area. Among these are:

- Blåfjell ilmenite mine
- Gursli molybdenum mine
- Ørsdalen tungsten mine
