= Magnhild Eia =

Norwegian politician (born 1960)

Magnhild Rita Eia (born 15 January 1960) is a Norwegian politician for the Centre Party.

She served as a deputy representative to the Norwegian Parliament from Rogaland during the term 1993–1997, 1997–2001, 2001–2005 and 2005–2009.

From 2005 to 2007, during the second cabinet Stoltenberg, she was a political advisor in the Ministry of Local Government and Regional Development.

On the local level, she has been deputy mayor of Lund Municipality.
