= Lundevatnet =

Lake in Rogaland, Norway

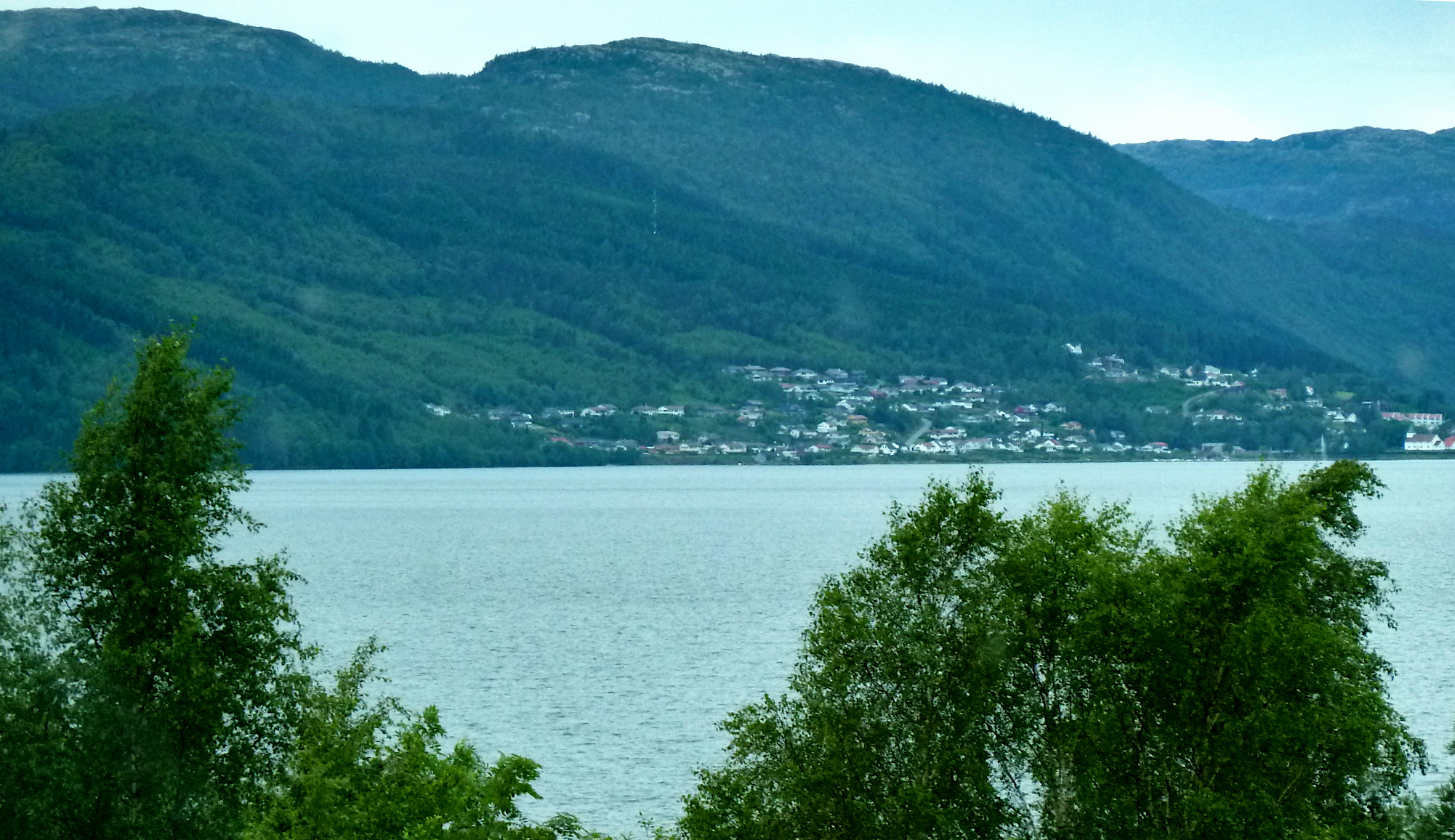
- Interactive map of Lundevatnet
- Location: Lund Municipality, Rogaland
- Coordinates: 58.35578°N 6.58749°E
- Type: Glacial fjord lake
- Primary inflows: Drivdalsåna, Moisåna river and Sira
- Primary outflows: Sireåna river
- Catchment area: 1,899.71 km^{2} (733.48 sq mi)
- Basin countries: Norway
- Max. length: 21 km (13 mi)
- Max. width: 2.4 km (1.5 mi)
- Surface area: 27.49 km^{2} (10.61 sq mi)
- Average depth: 172 m (564 ft)
- Max. depth: 314 m (1,030 ft)
- Water volume: 4.73 km^{3} (1.13 cu mi)
- Shore length^{1}: 59.8 km (37.2 mi)
- Surface elevation: 49 m (161 ft)
- References: NVE
- ^{1} Shore length is not a well-defined measure.

Lundevatnet is a lake in southwestern Norway. The lake lies along the border of Lund Municipality (in Rogaland county) and Flekkefjord Municipality (in Agder county). The village of Moi lies at the northern end of the lake and the smaller village of Åna-Sira lies just south of the southern end of the lake. The lake has a small dam at the southern end and it is used for the nearby Åna-Sira Power Station.

The 27.49-square-kilometre (10.61 sq mi) lake is about 25 kilometres (16 mi) long. It is the ninth-deepest lake in Norway and extends about 265 m (869 ft) below sea level and since it sits at an elevation of 49 m (161 ft), the maximum depth of the lake is 314 m (1,030 ft). This overdeepening, as well as its long and narrow shape, are characteristics of glacially-formed lakes.

== See also ==
- List of lakes in Norway
