= Lund Church, Rogaland =

Church in Rogaland, Norway

Lund Church
- Lund kirke
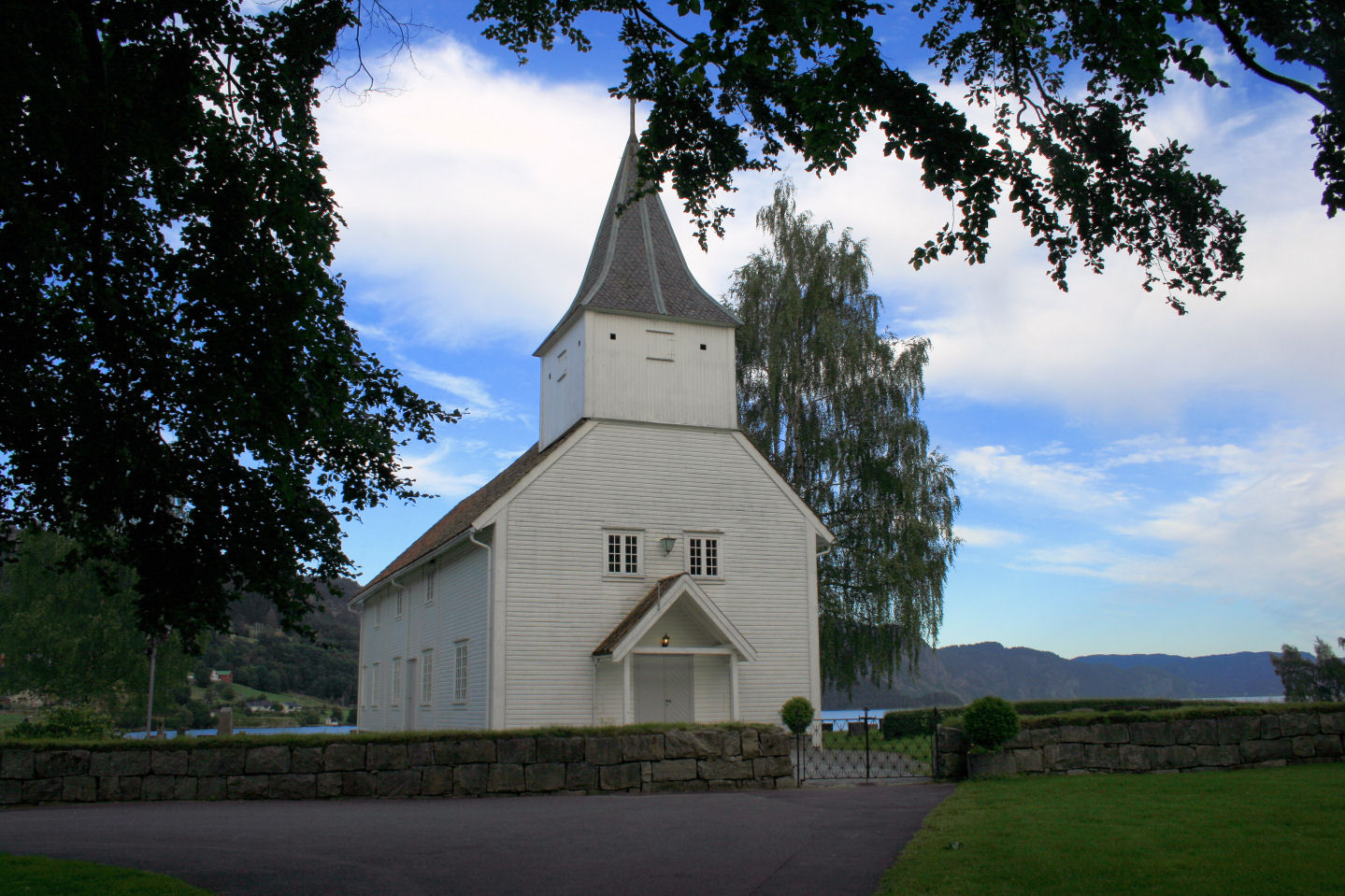
- View of the church
- Lund Church
- 58.448012°N 06.553519°E
- Location: Lund Municipality, Rogaland
- Country: Norway
- Denomination: Church of Norway
- Churchmanship: Evangelical Lutheran

History
- Status: Parish church
- Founded: 14th century
- Consecrated: 23 Sept 1812

Architecture
- Functional status: Active
- Architectural type: Long church
- Completed: 1808 (218 years ago)

Specifications
- Capacity: 420
- Materials: Wood

Administration
- Diocese: Stavanger bispedømme
- Deanery: Dalane prosti
- Parish: Lund
- Norwegian Cultural Heritage Site
- Type: Church
- Status: Automatically protected
- ID: 84332

Lund Church (Norwegian: Lund kirke) is a parish church of the Church of Norway in Lund Municipality in Rogaland county, Norway. It is located in the village of Moi. It is the church for the Lund parish which is part of the Dalane prosti (deanery) in the Diocese of Stavanger. The white, wooden church was built in a long church style in 1808 using designs by an unknown architect. The church seats about 420 people.

== History ==
The earliest existing historical records of the church date back to the year 1409. The first church was likely a stave church. In 1618, the church was described as a small long church when records show that major roof repairs were carried out. Then in 1630, the nave of the church was renovated and enlarged. In 1808, the church was torn down and a new, larger church was constructed on the same site using many of the same materials that were salvaged from the old church. The new church was consecrated on 23 September 1812 by the Bishop Christian Sørenssen.

== See also ==
- List of churches in Rogaland
