= Lund Municipality (Norway) =

Municipality in Rogaland, Norway

Lund Municipality Lund kommune
- Municipality
- Lunde herred (historic name)
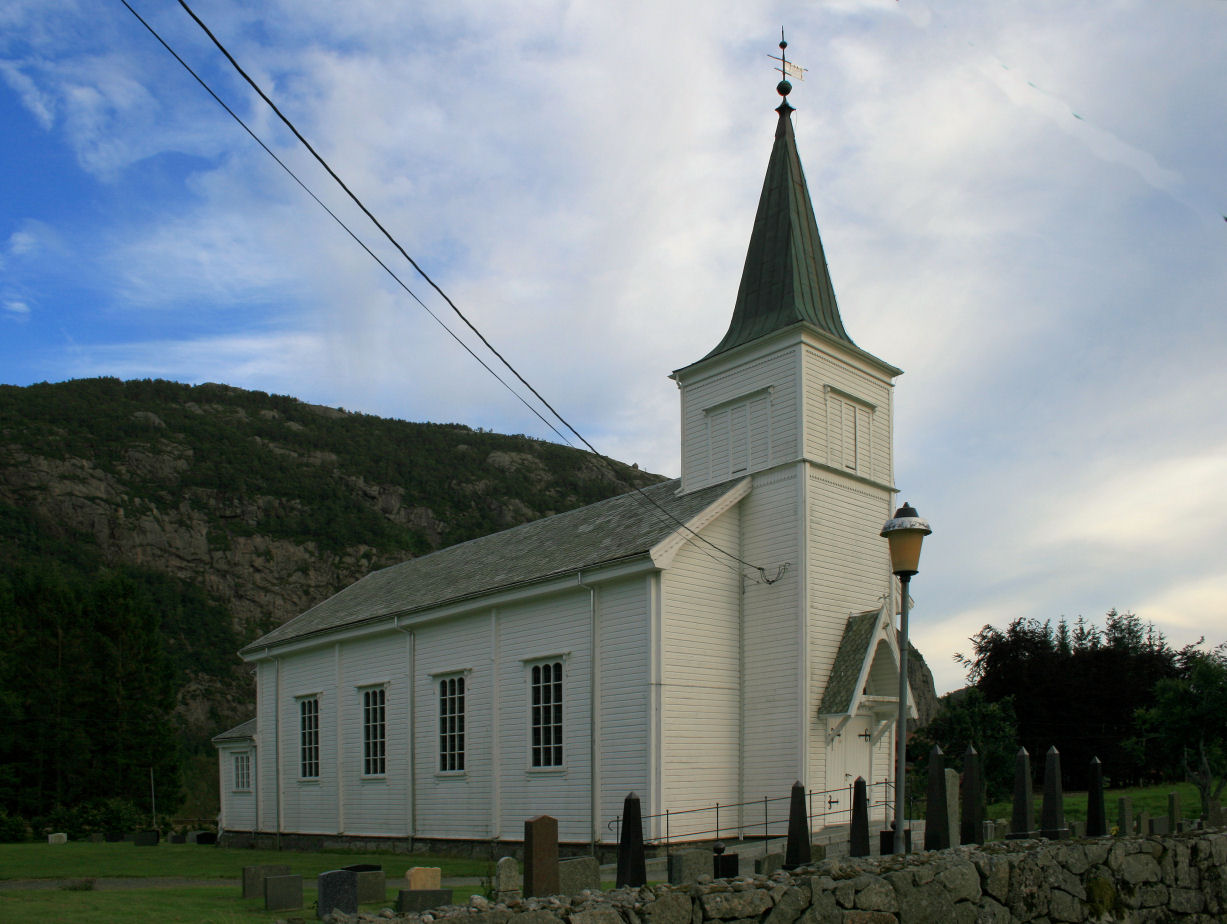
- View of the local Heskestad Church

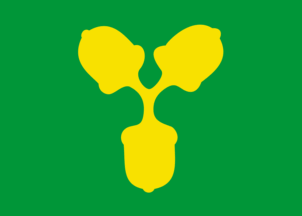
- Flag Coat of arms

- Rogaland within Norway

- Lund within Rogaland
- Coordinates: 58°31′11″N 06°27′41″E
- Country: Norway
- County: Rogaland
- District: Dalane
- Established: 1 Jan 1838
  - Created as: Formannskapsdistrikt
- Administrative centre: Moi

Government
  - Mayor (2023): Gro Helleland (KrF)

Area
  - Total: 408.39 km^{2} (157.68 sq mi)
  - Land: 353.62 km^{2} (136.53 sq mi)
  - Water: 54.77 km^{2} (21.15 sq mi) 13.4%
  - Rank: #236 in Norway
- Highest elevation: 731.05 m (2,398.5 ft)

Population (2026)
  - Total: 3,229
  - Rank: #224 in Norway
  - Density: 7.9/km^{2} (20/sq mi)
  - Change (10 years): ▼ −0.4%
- Demonym: Lunddøl

Official language
  - Norwegian form: Neutral
- Time zone: UTC+01:00 (CET)
  - Summer (DST): UTC+02:00 (CEST)
- ISO 3166 code: NO-1112
- Website: Official website

Lund is a municipality in Rogaland county, Norway. It is located in the traditional district of Dalane. The administrative centre of the municipality is the village of Moi. Other villages in Lund include Eik and, Heskestad. European route E39 and the Sørlandet Line both pass through Lund. Moi Station is a railway station in Lund.

The 408.39-square-kilometre (157.68 sq mi) municipality is the 236th largest by area out of the 357 municipalities in Norway. Lund Municipality is the 224th most populous municipality in Norway with a population of 3,229. The municipality's population density is 7.9 inhabitants per square kilometre (20/sq mi) and its population has decreased by 0.4% over the previous 10-year period.

== General information ==
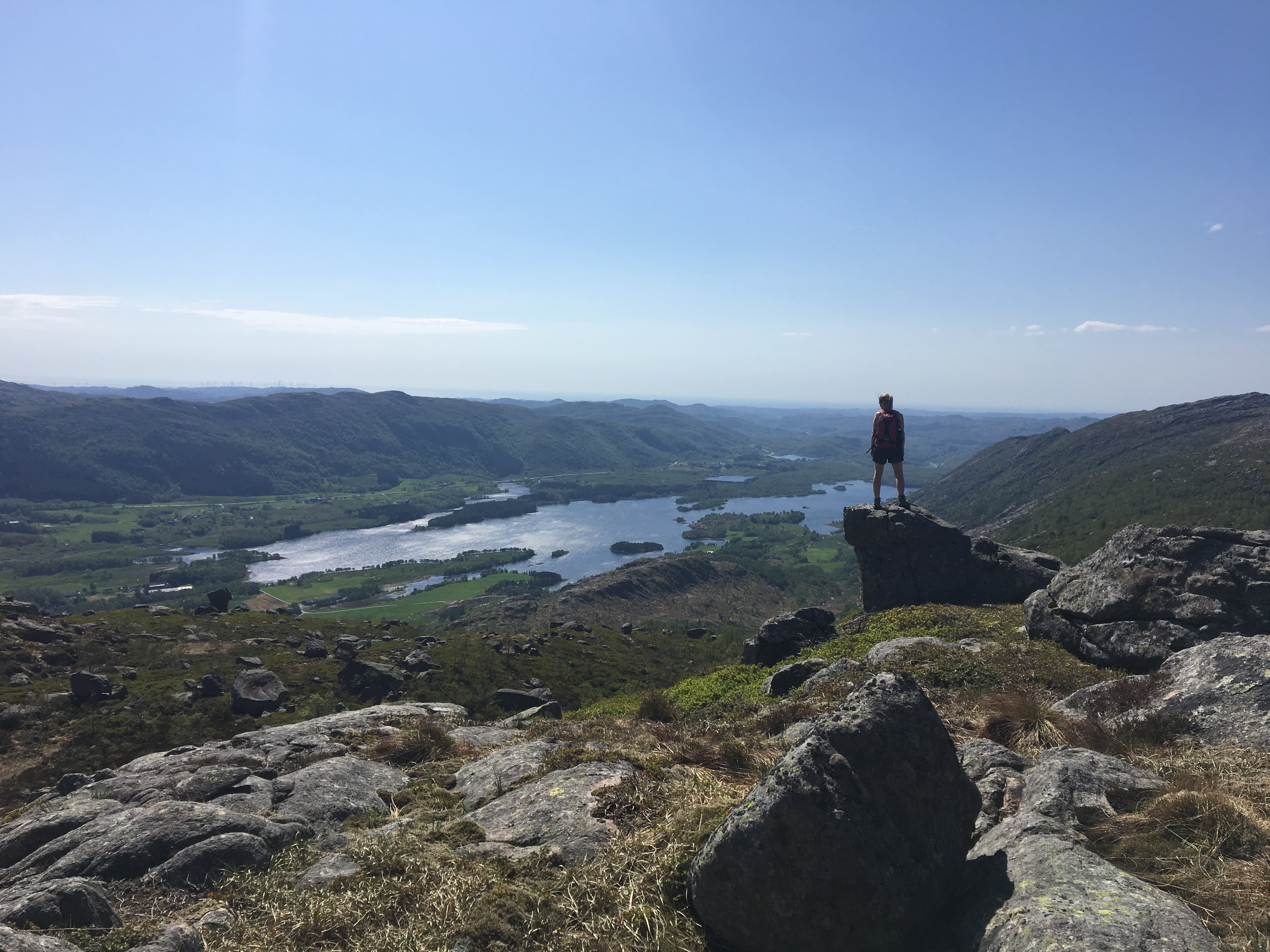
Magma UNESCO Global Geopark

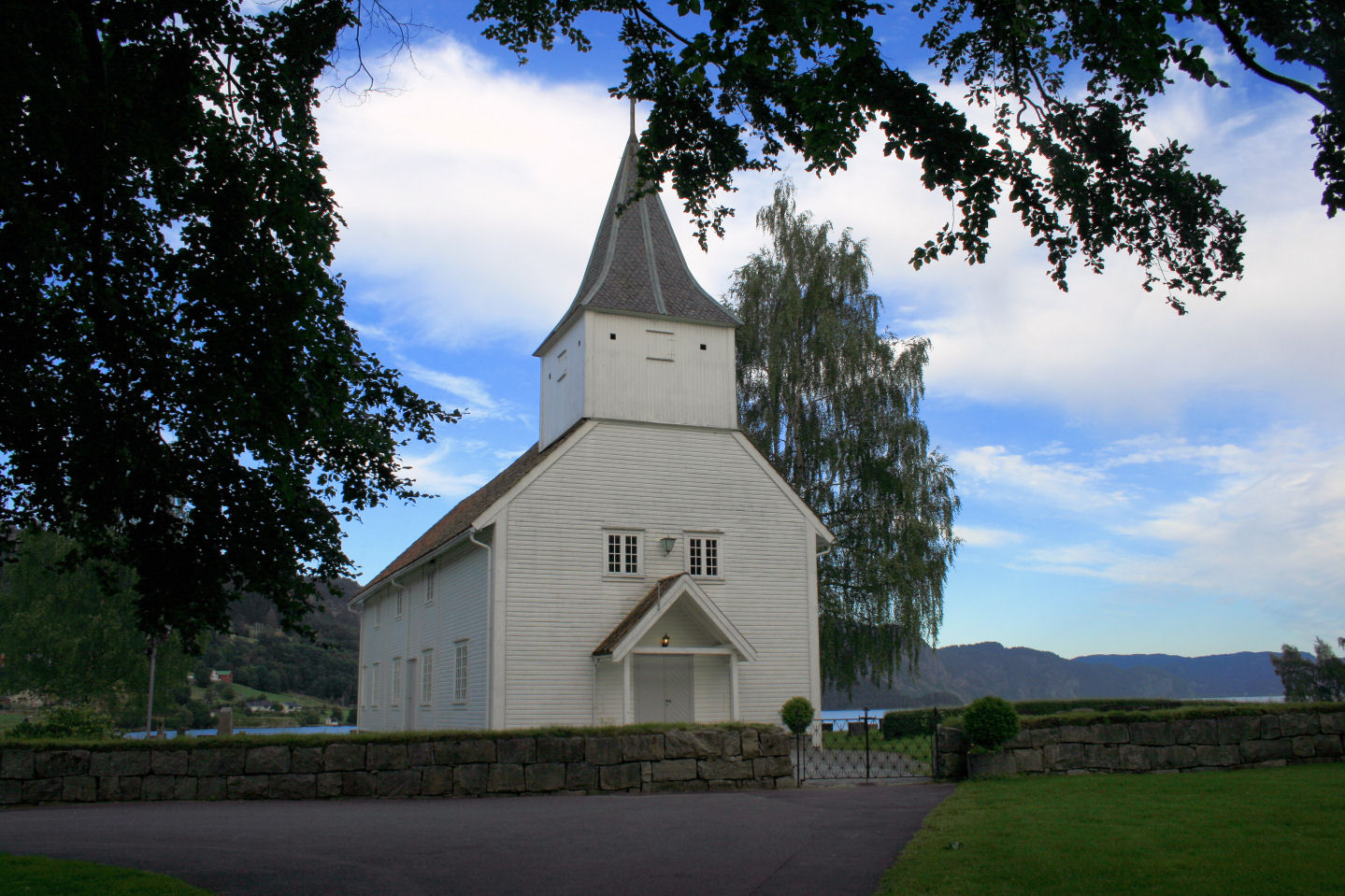
Lund Church

The parish of Lunde (later spelled Lund) was established as a municipality on 1 January 1838 (see formannskapsdistrikt law). During the 1960s, there were many municipal mergers across Norway due to the work of the Schei Committee. On 1 January 1965, Lund Municipality (population: 1,953) was merged with most of Heskestad Municipality (population: 547) to form a much larger Lund Municipality.

=== Name ===
The municipality (originally the parish) is named after the old Lund farm (Old Norse: Lundr) since the first Lund Church was built there. The name is identical to the word lundr which means "grove" (but here maybe "sacred grove"). Before 1889, the name was written "Lunde".

=== Coat of arms ===
The coat of arms was granted on 14 December 1984. The official blazon is "Vert, three acorns in pall stems conjoined Or" (Norwegian: I grønt tre gull eikenøtter i trepass). This means the arms have a green field (background) and the charge is a cluster of three acorn with their stems connected. The charge has a tincture of Or which means it is commonly colored yellow, but if it is made out of metal, then gold is used. The acorns symbolize the many oak trees in the municipality, as well as many toponyms and names of farms, which start with Eik (oak), such as Eik, Eike, and Eikeland. There are three acorns to represent the three main population centres in the municipality (Moi, Hovsherad, and Ualand/Heskestad). The arms were designed by Svein Arild Berntsen. The municipal flag has the same design as the coat of arms.

=== Churches ===
The Church of Norway has two parishes (sokn) within Lund Municipality. It is part of the Dalane prosti (deanery) in the Diocese of Stavanger.

Churches in Lund Municipality
Parish (sokn)	Church name	Location of the church	Year built
Heskestad	Heskestad Church	Heskestad	1904
Lund	Lund Church	Moi	1808

== Geography ==
Lund Municipality lies in southeastern Rogaland county, along the border with Agder county. Sokndal Municipality lies to the south, Eigersund Municipality lies to the west, Sirdal Municipality (in Agder) to the north/northeast, and Flekkefjord Municipality (also in Agder) to the east.

The lake Lundevatnet lies on the southeastern border of Lund. The lake Hovsvatnet lies in the central part of Lund, north of Moi. The lakes Grøsfjellvatnet and Teksevatnet lie on the western borders of Lund Municipality. The highest point in the municipality is the 731.05-metre (2,398.5 ft) tall mountain Lindtjørnknuten, located on the northern border with Sirdal Municipality.

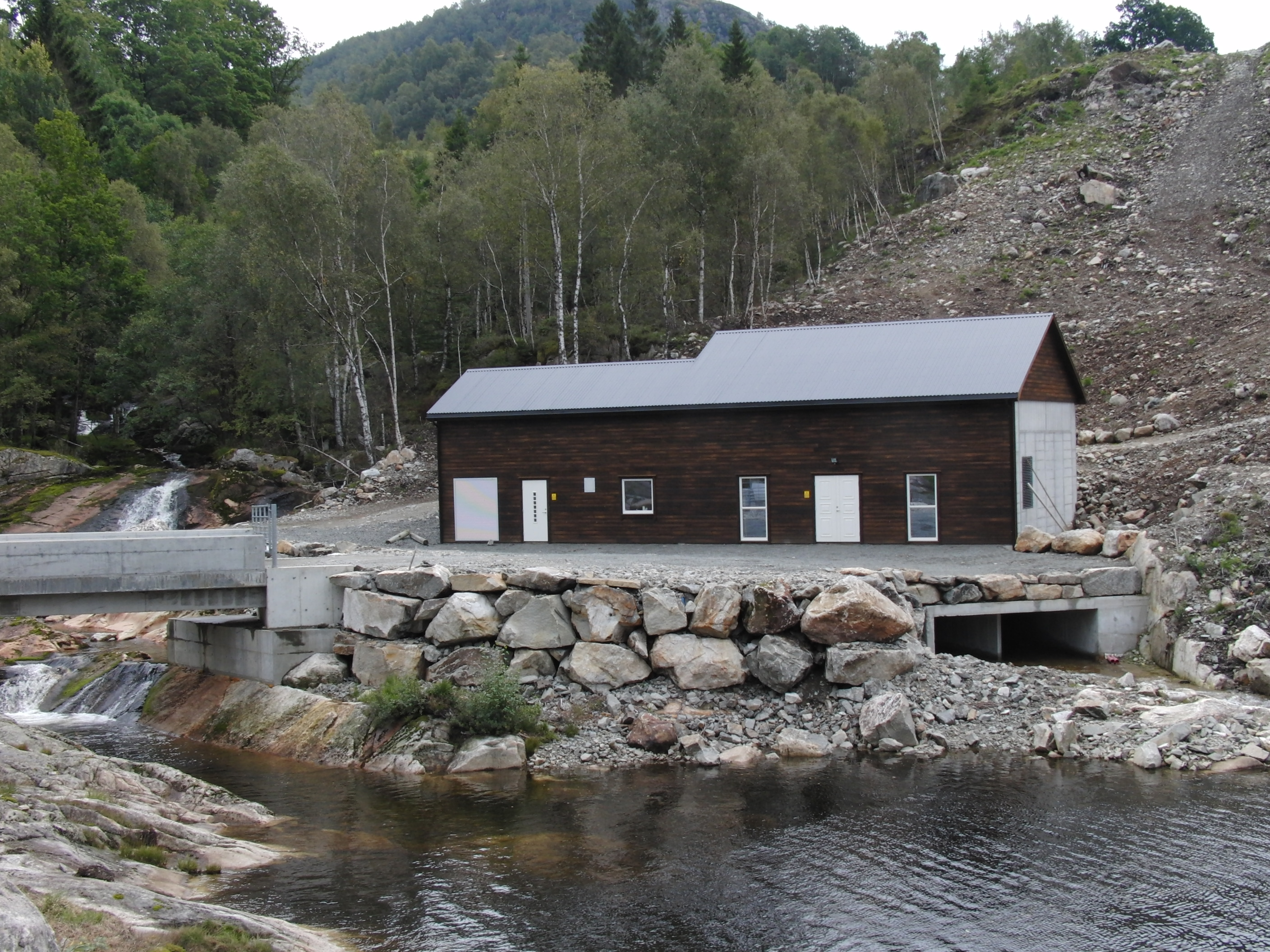
Østre og Vestre Neset kraftverk

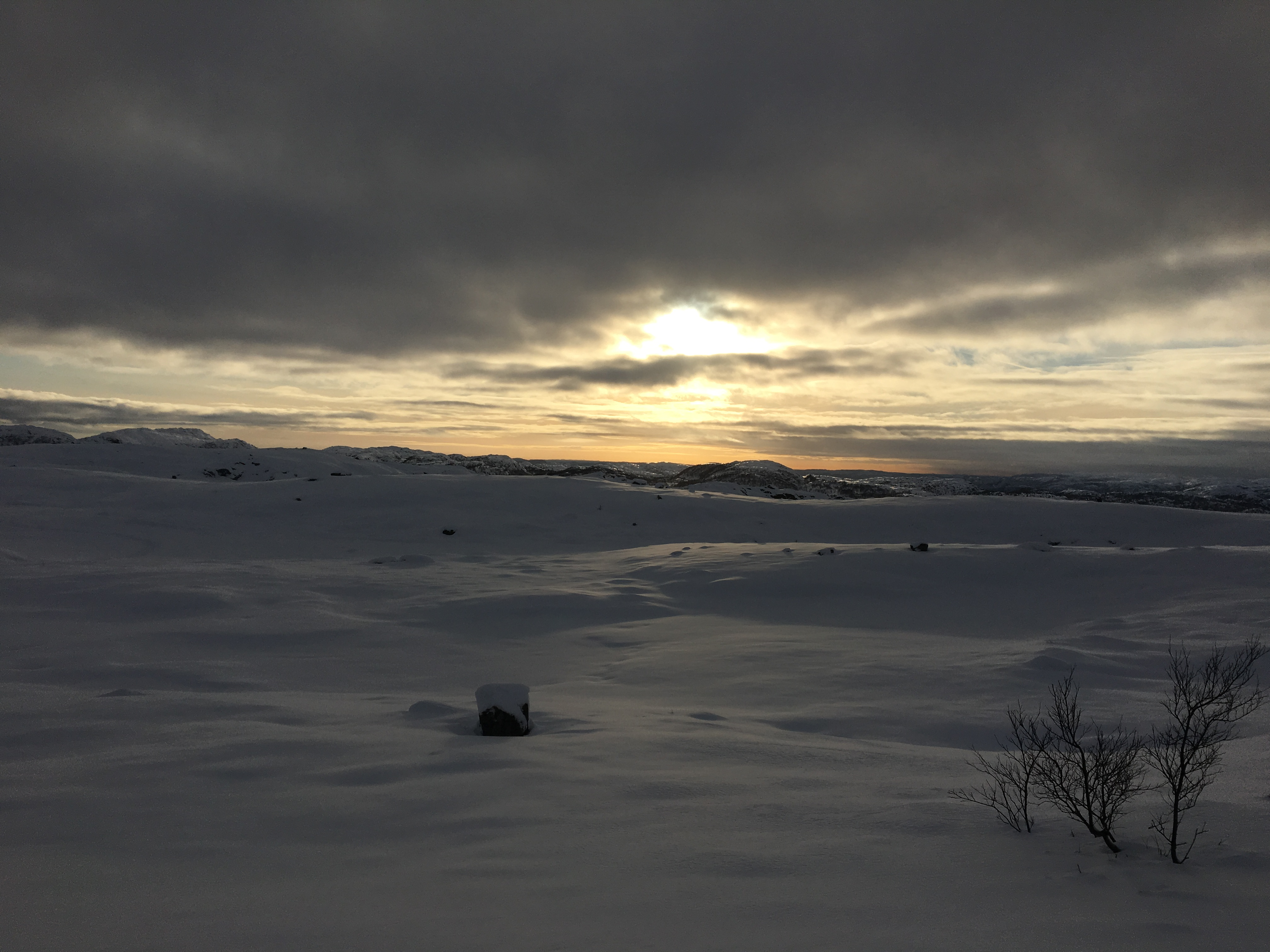
Mountain «Hesten» in Lund Municipality, Magma UNESCO Global Geopark

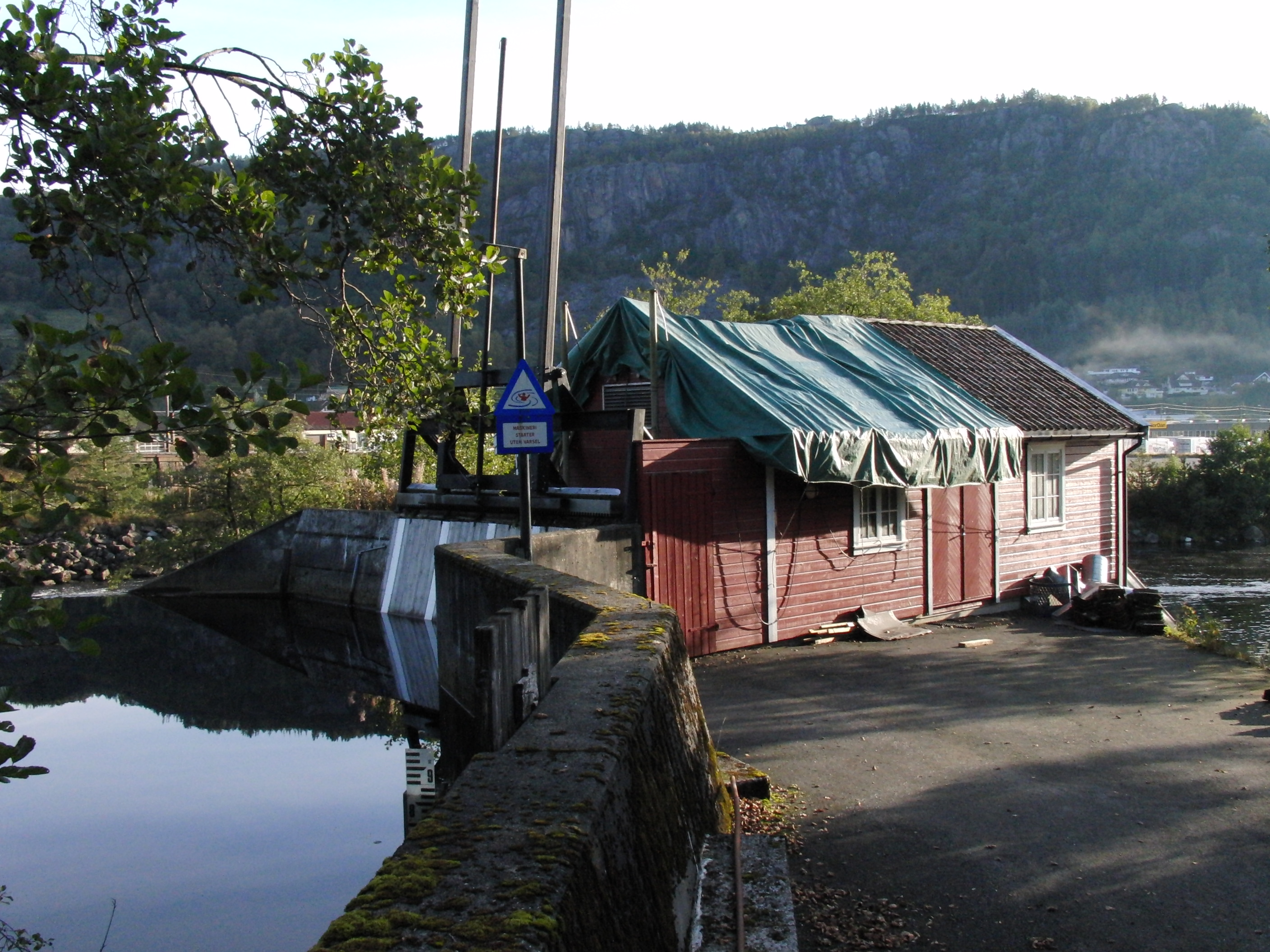
Moi Elverk kraftverk

=== Climate ===
Climate data for Moi
Month	Jan	Feb	Mar	Apr	May	Jun	Jul	Aug	Sep	Oct	Nov	Dec	Year
Daily mean °C (°F)	−1.5 (29.3)	−1.5 (29.3)	1.0 (33.8)	4.4 (39.9)	9.3 (48.7)	13.0 (55.4)	14.2 (57.6)	13.7 (56.7)	10.6 (51.1)	7.6 (45.7)	3.0 (37.4)	−0.6 (30.9)	6.1 (43.0)
Average precipitation mm (inches)	198 (7.8)	145 (5.7)	156 (6.1)	90 (3.5)	113 (4.4)	111 (4.4)	122 (4.8)	170 (6.7)	232 (9.1)	273 (10.7)	258 (10.2)	222 (8.7)	2,090 (82.3)
Source: Norwegian Meteorological Institute

== Government ==
Lund Municipality is responsible for primary education (through 10th grade), outpatient health services, senior citizen services, welfare and other social services, zoning, economic development, and municipal roads and utilities. The municipality is governed by a municipal council of directly elected representatives. The mayor is indirectly elected by a vote of the municipal council. The municipality is under the jurisdiction of the Sør-Rogaland District Court and the Gulating Court of Appeal.

=== Municipal council ===
The municipal council (Kommunestyre) of Lund is made up of 21 representatives that are elected to four year terms. The tables below show the current and historical composition of the council by political party.

Lund kommunestyre 2023–2027
Party name (in Norwegian)	Number of representatives
Labour Party (Arbeiderpartiet)	3
Progress Party (Fremskrittspartiet)	3
Conservative Party (Høyre)	5
Christian Democratic Party (Kristelig Folkeparti)	6
Centre Party (Senterpartiet)	4
Total number of members:	21

Lund kommunestyre 2019–2023
Party name (in Norwegian)	Number of representatives
Labour Party (Arbeiderpartiet)	4
Progress Party (Fremskrittspartiet)	3
Conservative Party (Høyre)	4
Christian Democratic Party (Kristelig Folkeparti)	4
Centre Party (Senterpartiet)	5
Liberal Party (Venstre)	1
Total number of members:	21

Lund kommunestyre 2015–2019
Party name (in Norwegian)	Number of representatives
Labour Party (Arbeiderpartiet)	7
Progress Party (Fremskrittspartiet)	4
Conservative Party (Høyre)	3
Christian Democratic Party (Kristelig Folkeparti)	3
Centre Party (Senterpartiet)	2
Liberal Party (Venstre)	2
Total number of members:	21

Lund kommunestyre 2011–2015
Party name (in Norwegian)	Number of representatives
Labour Party (Arbeiderpartiet)	6
Progress Party (Fremskrittspartiet)	3
Conservative Party (Høyre)	3
Christian Democratic Party (Kristelig Folkeparti)	5
Centre Party (Senterpartiet)	3
Liberal Party (Venstre)	1
Total number of members:	21

Lund kommunestyre 2007–2011
Party name (in Norwegian)	Number of representatives
Labour Party (Arbeiderpartiet)	5
Progress Party (Fremskrittspartiet)	5
Conservative Party (Høyre)	1
Christian Democratic Party (Kristelig Folkeparti)	5
Centre Party (Senterpartiet)	4
Liberal Party (Venstre)	1
Total number of members:	21

Lund kommunestyre 2003–2007
Party name (in Norwegian)	Number of representatives
Labour Party (Arbeiderpartiet)	4
Progress Party (Fremskrittspartiet)	5
Conservative Party (Høyre)	2
Christian Democratic Party (Kristelig Folkeparti)	5
Centre Party (Senterpartiet)	4
Liberal Party (Venstre)	1
Total number of members:	21

Lund kommunestyre 1999–2003
Party name (in Norwegian)	Number of representatives
Labour Party (Arbeiderpartiet)	6
Progress Party (Fremskrittspartiet)	4
Conservative Party (Høyre)	3
Christian Democratic Party (Kristelig Folkeparti)	6
Centre Party (Senterpartiet)	5
Liberal Party (Venstre)	1
Total number of members:	25

Lund kommunestyre 1995–1999
Party name (in Norwegian)	Number of representatives
Labour Party (Arbeiderpartiet)	6
Progress Party (Fremskrittspartiet)	2
Conservative Party (Høyre)	4
Christian Democratic Party (Kristelig Folkeparti)	7
Centre Party (Senterpartiet)	5
Liberal Party (Venstre)	1
Total number of members:	25

Lund kommunestyre 1991–1995
Party name (in Norwegian)	Number of representatives
Labour Party (Arbeiderpartiet)	6
Conservative Party (Høyre)	6
Christian Democratic Party (Kristelig Folkeparti)	7
Centre Party (Senterpartiet)	5
Liberal Party (Venstre)	1
Total number of members:	25

Lund kommunestyre 1987–1991
Party name (in Norwegian)	Number of representatives
Labour Party (Arbeiderpartiet)	7
Progress Party (Fremskrittspartiet)	2
Conservative Party (Høyre)	4
Christian Democratic Party (Kristelig Folkeparti)	7
Centre Party (Senterpartiet)	3
Liberal Party (Venstre)	2
Total number of members:	25

Lund kommunestyre 1983–1987
Party name (in Norwegian)	Number of representatives
Labour Party (Arbeiderpartiet)	5
Progress Party (Fremskrittspartiet)	1
Conservative Party (Høyre)	4
Christian Democratic Party (Kristelig Folkeparti)	6
Centre Party (Senterpartiet)	3
Total number of members:	19

Lund kommunestyre 1979–1983
Party name (in Norwegian)	Number of representatives
Labour Party (Arbeiderpartiet)	5
Conservative Party (Høyre)	4
Christian Democratic Party (Kristelig Folkeparti)	5
Centre Party (Senterpartiet)	3
Hovsherad List (Hovsheradlista)	2
Total number of members:	19

Lund kommunestyre 1975–1979
Party name (in Norwegian)	Number of representatives
Labour Party (Arbeiderpartiet)	5
Conservative Party (Høyre)	3
Christian Democratic Party (Kristelig Folkeparti)	5
Centre Party (Senterpartiet)	4
Local list (Bygdelista)	1
Hovsherad List (Hovsheradlista)	1
Total number of members:	19

Lund kommunestyre 1971–1975
Party name (in Norwegian)	Number of representatives
Labour Party (Arbeiderpartiet)	5
Conservative Party (Høyre)	2
Christian Democratic Party (Kristelig Folkeparti)	3
Centre Party (Senterpartiet)	5
Local List(s) (Lokale lister)	4
Total number of members:	19

Lund kommunestyre 1967–1971
Party name (in Norwegian)	Number of representatives
Labour Party (Arbeiderpartiet)	5
Conservative Party (Høyre)	2
Christian Democratic Party (Kristelig Folkeparti)	4
Centre Party (Senterpartiet)	4
Liberal Party (Venstre)	2
Local List(s) (Lokale lister)	2
Total number of members:	19

Lund kommunestyre 1963–1967
Party name (in Norwegian)	Number of representatives
Labour Party (Arbeiderpartiet)	4
Christian Democratic Party (Kristelig Folkeparti)	2
Centre Party (Senterpartiet)	2
Local List(s) (Lokale lister)	5
Total number of members:	13

Lund herredsstyre 1959–1963
Party name (in Norwegian)	Number of representatives
Labour Party (Arbeiderpartiet)	4
Christian Democratic Party (Kristelig Folkeparti)	2
Local List(s) (Lokale lister)	7
Total number of members:	13

Lund herredsstyre 1955–1959
Party name (in Norwegian)	Number of representatives
Labour Party (Arbeiderpartiet)	3
Christian Democratic Party (Kristelig Folkeparti)	2
Local List(s) (Lokale lister)	8
Total number of members:	13

Lund herredsstyre 1951–1955
Party name (in Norwegian)	Number of representatives
Labour Party (Arbeiderpartiet)	3
Christian Democratic Party (Kristelig Folkeparti)	2
Local List(s) (Lokale lister)	7
Total number of members:	12

Lund herredsstyre 1947–1951
Party name (in Norwegian)	Number of representatives
Labour Party (Arbeiderpartiet)	3
Christian Democratic Party (Kristelig Folkeparti)	2
Local List(s) (Lokale lister)	7
Total number of members:	12

Lund herredsstyre 1945–1947
Party name (in Norwegian)	Number of representatives
Labour Party (Arbeiderpartiet)	3
Local List(s) (Lokale lister)	9
Total number of members:	12

Lund herredsstyre 1937–1941*
Party name (in Norwegian)	Number of representatives
Labour Party (Arbeiderpartiet)	3
Joint List(s) of Non-Socialist Parties (Borgerlige Felleslister)	9
Total number of members:	12
Note: Due to the German occupation of Norway during World War II, no elections were held for new municipal councils until after the war ended in 1945.

=== Mayors ===
The mayor (Norwegian: ordfører) of Lund Municipality is the political leader of the municipality and the chairperson of the municipal council. The following people have held this position:

- 1838–1843: Didrik Sigbjørnsen
- 1844–1845: Michael H. Dahl
- 1846–1849: Rev. Peter Boiesen Wettergreen
- 1850–1851: Lars Pedersen Skaaland
- 1852–1855: Ommund O. Øveland
- 1856–1859: Tønnes T. Eeg
- 1860–1861: Conrad Christiansen Drivdahl
- 1862–1863: Tønnes T. Eeg
- 1864–1865: Sigbjørn Didriksen
- 1866–1867: Tønnes T. Eeg
- 1868–1869: Peder Larsen Skaaland
- 1870–1873: Tønnes T. Eeg
- 1874–1876: Carl O. Stenberg
- 1877–1881: Peder Larsen Skaaland
- 1882–1883: Didrik S. Lindland
- 1884–1887: Carl O. Stenberg
- 1888–1889: Didrik S. Lindland
- 1890–1893: Anthon Salvesen
- 1894–1895: Ommund T. Hofve
- 1896–1897: Didrik B. Fladestøl
- 1898–1898: Jens S. Skaaland
- 1899–1913: Kristian Asbjørnsen Tjellesvik
- 1914–1918: Andreas Hofsmo
- 1919–1922: Kristian Asbjørnsen Tjellesvik
- 1923–1931: Peter T. Skaaland
- 1932–1946: Karl Henriksen
- 1946–1955: Willas Moi
- 1956–1958: Didrik Lindland
- 1958–1959: Elias Johan Finstad
- 1960–1963: Finn Henriksen
- 1964–1969: Bjarne Kjørberg
- 1969–1979: Jacob Heskestad (Sp)
- 1979–1981: Finn Henriksen (H)
- 1981–1991: Kjell Erfjord (KrF)
- 1991–1995: Ingvar Gursli (Ap)
- 1995–1999: Tore Tagholdt (KrF)
- 1999–2007: Kjell Erfjord (KrF)
- 2007–2011: Olav Hafstad (Ap)
- 2011–2015: Pål Anker Ravndal (KrF)
- 2015–2019: Olav Hafstad (Ap)
- 2019–2020: Hogne Skjerpe (H)
- 2020–2023: Magnhild Eia (Sp)
- 2023–present: Gro Helleland (KrF)

== Notable people ==
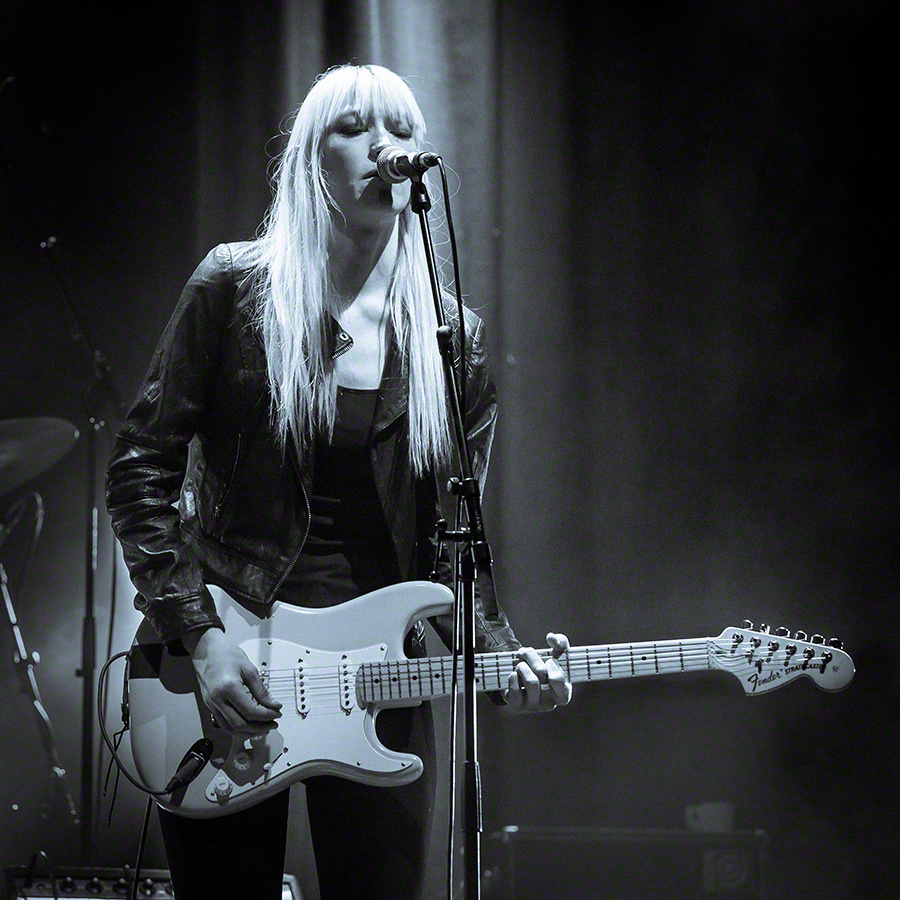
Hilma Nikolaisen, 2016

- Erik Vullum (1850 in Lund – 1916), a Norwegian journalist, writer and politician
- Pete Sanstol (1905 in Moi – 1982), a Norwegian professional boxer from Canada
- Magnhild Eia (born 1960), a Norwegian politician, former deputy mayor of Lund
- Boye Brogeland (born 1973 in Moi), a Norwegian professional bridge player
- Børge André Rannestad (born 1973 in Moi), a retired Norwegian football midfielder
- Emil Nikolaisen (born 1977 in Moi), a musician, bandleader, & singer of Serena-Maneesh
- Hilma Nikolaisen (born 1982 in Moi), a Norwegian musician, singer and bass guitar player
