= Heskestad =

Village in Lund Municipality, Norway

- Village
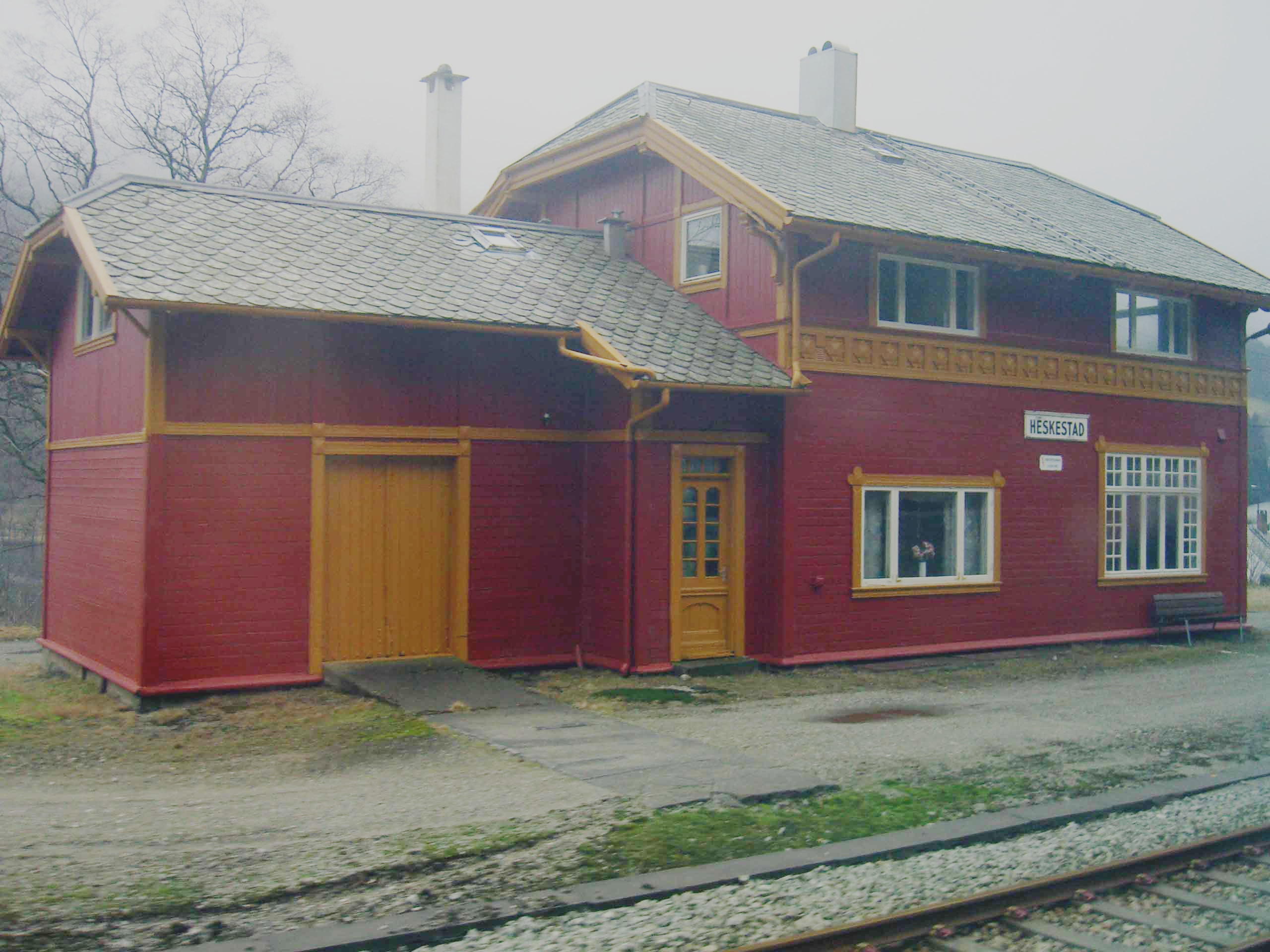
- View of the historic railway station in Heskestad
- Interactive map of Heskestad
- Coordinates: 58.49356°N 6.35699°E
- Country: Norway
- Region: Western Norway
- County: Rogaland
- District: Dalane
- Municipality: Lund Municipality
- Elevation: 192 m (630 ft)
- Time zone: UTC+01:00 (CET)
  - Summer (DST): UTC+02:00 (CEST)
- Post Code: 4463 Ualand

Heskestad is a village in Lund Municipality in Rogaland county, Norway. The village is located in the western part of Lund Municipality, along the European route E39 highway and the Sørlandet Line, about 15 kilometres (9.3 mi) northwest of the village of Moi. Heskestad Station is a now-closed railway station located in the village.

The Church of Norway's Heskestad Church, dating back to 1904, is located in the village and it serves the western part of the municipality.

== History ==
Heskestad was the administrative centre of the old Heskestad Municipality which existed from 1838 until 1965.
