= Heskestad Church =

Church in Rogaland, Norway

- Heskestad kyrkje
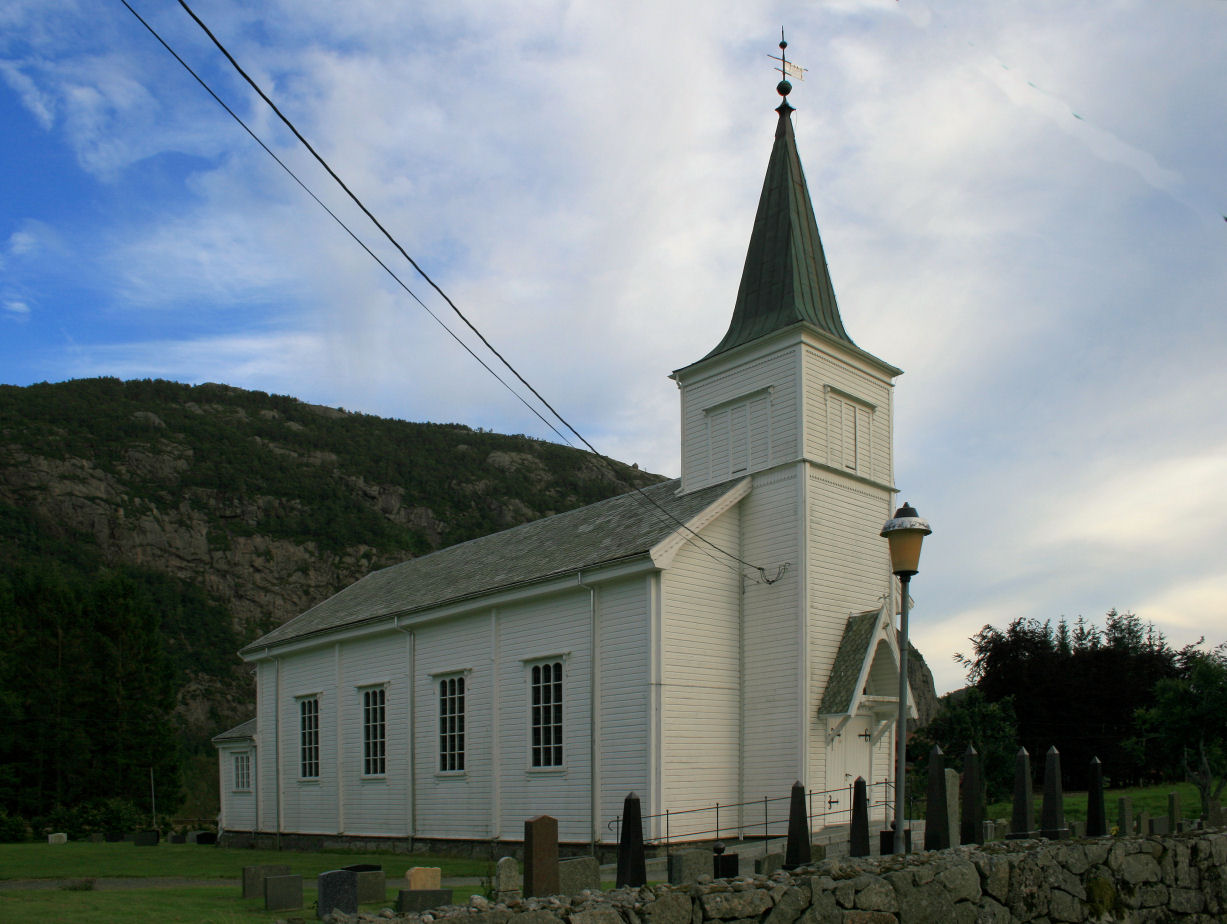
- View of the church
- Heskestad Church
- 58.497845°N 06.359358°E
- Location: Lund Municipality, Rogaland
- Country: Norway
- Denomination: Church of Norway
- Churchmanship: Evangelical Lutheran

History
- Status: Parish church
- Founded: 13th century
- Consecrated: 1904

Architecture
- Functional status: Active
- Architect: Victor Nordan
- Architectural type: Long church
- Completed: 1904 (122 years ago)

Specifications
- Capacity: 240
- Materials: Wood

Administration
- Diocese: Stavanger bispedømme
- Deanery: Dalane prosti
- Parish: Heskestad
- Norwegian Cultural Heritage Site
- Type: Church
- Status: Not protected
- ID: 84568

Heskestad Church (Norwegian: Heskestad kyrkje) is a parish church of the Church of Norway in Lund Municipality in Rogaland county, Norway. It is located in the village of Heskestad. It is the church for the Heskestad parish which is part of the Dalane prosti (deanery) in the Diocese of Stavanger. The white, wooden church was built in a long church style in 1905 using designs by the architect Victor Nordan. The church seats about 240 people.

== History ==
The earliest existing historical records of the church date back to the year 1380, but the church was not new that year. The medieval stave church was renovated during the first half of the 1600s. In 1734, the old church was torn down and replaced with a new building. In 1827, the church building was again torn down and replaced with a new building. In 1905, a new church was constructed about 700 metres (0.43 mi) north of the old church site. After the new church was completed, the old church was torn down.

== See also ==
- List of churches in Rogaland
