= Moi, Rogaland =

Village in Lund Municipality, Norway

Moi
- Village
- Interactive map of Moi
- Coordinates: 58.45674°N 6.55185°E
- Country: Norway
- Region: Western Norway
- County: Rogaland
- District: Dalane
- Municipality: Lund Municipality

Area
  - Total: 1.62 km^{2} (0.63 sq mi)
- Elevation: 52 m (171 ft)

Population (2025)
  - Total: 2,019
  - Density: 1,246/km^{2} (3,230/sq mi)
- Time zone: UTC+01:00 (CET)
  - Summer (DST): UTC+02:00 (CEST)
- Post Code: 4460 Moi

Moi is the administrative centre of Lund Municipality in Rogaland county, Norway. The village is located at the northern end of the lake Lundevatnet, one of the deepest lakes in Norway. The European route E39 highway passes through Moi. The Sørlandet Line also runs through Moi, stopping at Moi Station.

The 1.62-square-kilometre (400-acre) village has a population (2025) of 2,019 and a population density of 1,246 inhabitants per square kilometre (3,230/sq mi).

== Industry ==
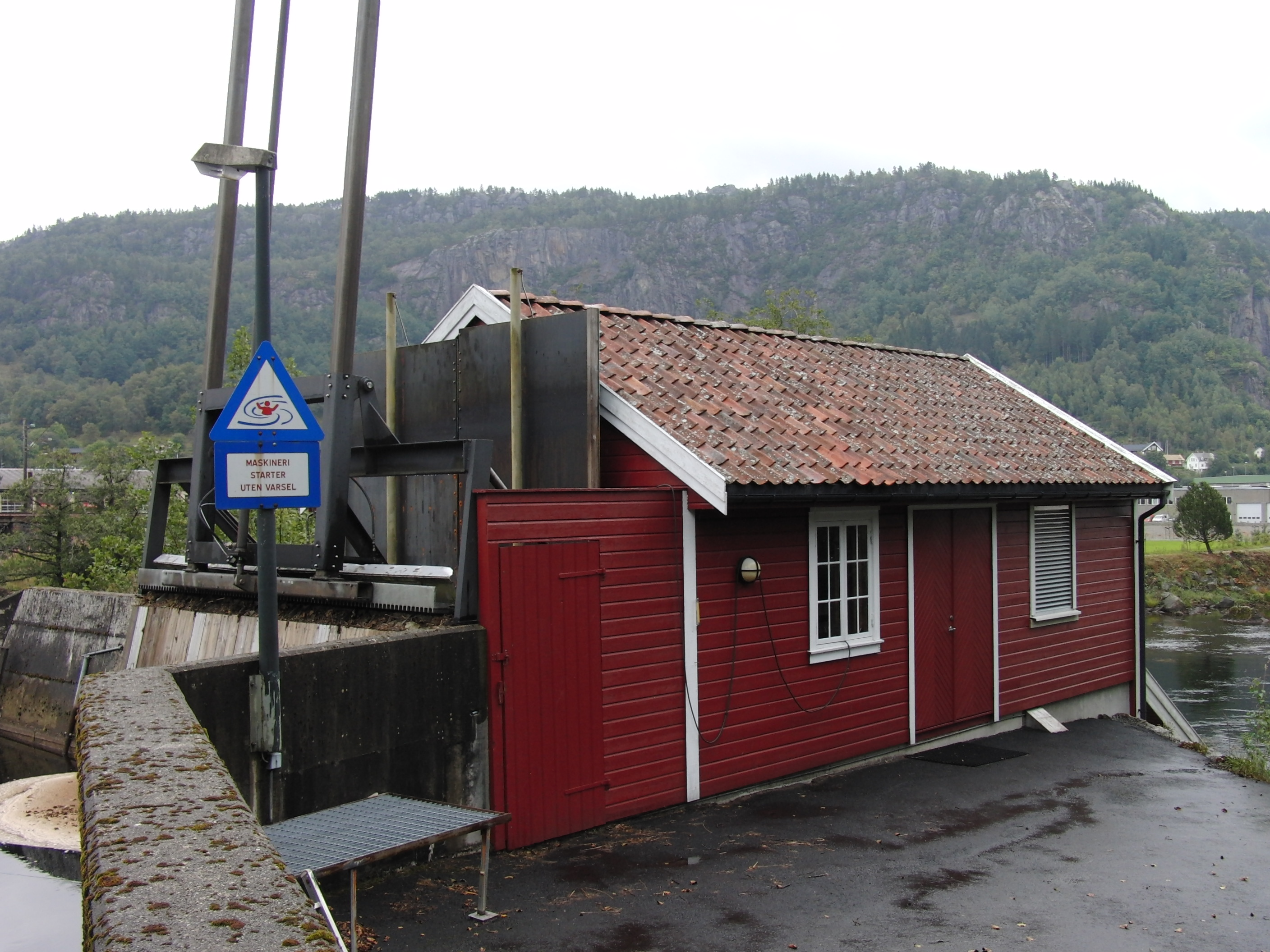
Small hydroelectric power station in Moi

The largest employer in Moi is NorDan, which is the largest window factory in northern Europe. After the Industrial Revolution, Moi developed a relatively large timber industry. Moi is also home to Moen Bjøllefabrikk, a bell manufacturer, which was the official supplier of animal bells used to cheer on athletes at the Lillehammer 1994 Winter Olympics, and in partnership with Cowbells.com for the Salt Lake City 2002 Winter Olympics. Additionally, Norway's only active clog factory is located just north of Moi in the village of Eik.

== Attractions ==
- Lund kirke, the local church, is approximately 200 years old and built in the traditional Norwegian country style in wood and painted white.
- Lund bygdemuseum og kulturbank, the local museum, is located by the church in the old barn of the priest's farm. It has an extensive display of agricultural tools as well as objects from World War II. Attached to the museum is Haien, an old farm, which is very well preserved.

== Notable people ==
- Several musicians are from Moi:
  - Elvira Nikolaisen
  - Emil Nikolaisen (Serena Maneesh)
  - Ivar Nikolaisen (Silver, The Good The Bad and The Zugly, Kvelertak)
  - Hilma Nikolaisen (Serena Maneesh)
  - Øystein Stensheim (Det Norske Solistkor).
- Pete Sanstol, Norway's only boxing world champion, was born in Moi. On 7 June 2005, the village raised a monolith in its city park to his memory.
- Boye Brogeland, a world champion contract bridge player, was born in Moi in 1973.
